= FDK =

FDK may refer to:

- Fortress Division Kreta, temporary designation of 164th Infantry Division (Wehrmacht), a World War II German Army unit
- Fraunhofer FDK AAC, an audio codec
- Adobe Font Development Kit for OpenType, a set of tools for editing and verifying OpenType fonts
- FDK Corporation, a manufacturer of batteries, majority belonging to Fujitsu
- FlyDamas, a Syrian airline (ICAO code FDK)
- Frederick Municipal Airport (Maryland), in the US (IATA airport code FDK)
- "F.D.K. (Fearless Doctor Killers)", a song on the Mudhoney album My Brother the Cow
- Fdk., abbreviation for the hybrid orchid genus Fredclarkeara
- FDK, also refers to Firmware Development Kit in the Embedded System
