= List of commercial failures in video game consoles =

This is a list of notable video game consoles considered commercial failures.

== 32X ==
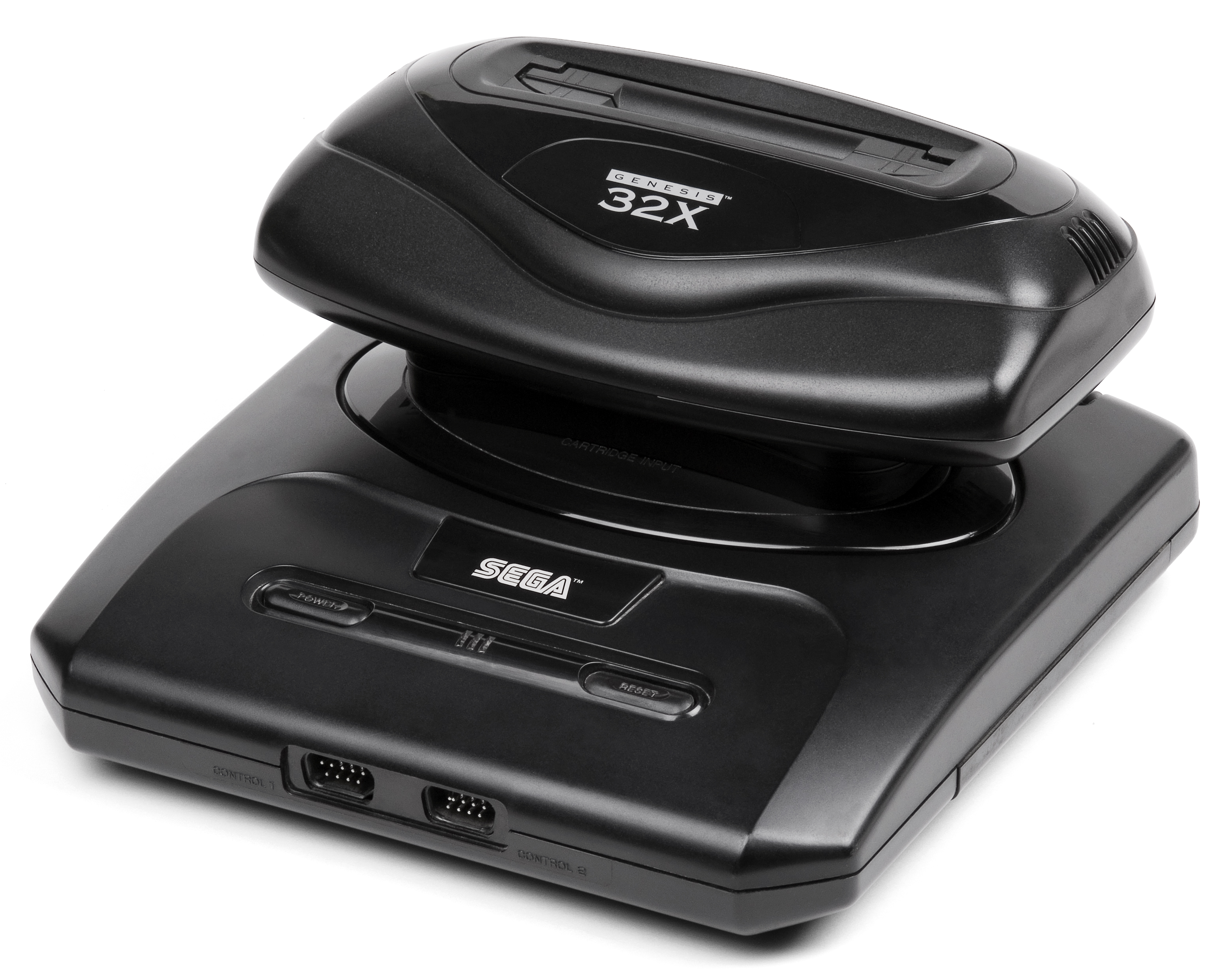
Sega 32X

Unveiled by Sega at June 1994's Consumer Electronics Show, the 32X was later described as the "poor man's entry into 'next generation' games". The product was originally conceived as an entirely new console by Sega Enterprises and positioned as an inexpensive alternative for gamers into the 32-bit era. However, at the suggestion of Sega of America research and development head Joe Miller, the console was converted into an add-on to the existing Mega Drive/Genesis and made more powerful, with two 32-bit central processing unit chips and a 3D graphics processor. Nevertheless, the console failed to attract either developers or consumers as the Sega Saturn had already been announced for release the next year. In part because of this, and also to rush the 32X to market before the holiday season in 1994, the 32X suffered from a poor library of titles, including Mega Drive/Genesis ports with improvements to the number of colors that appeared on screen. Originally released at US$159 (equivalent to $350 in 2025), Sega dropped the price to $99 in only a few months and ultimately cleared the remaining inventory at $19.95. About 665,000 units were sold.

== 3DO (interactive multiplayer) ==
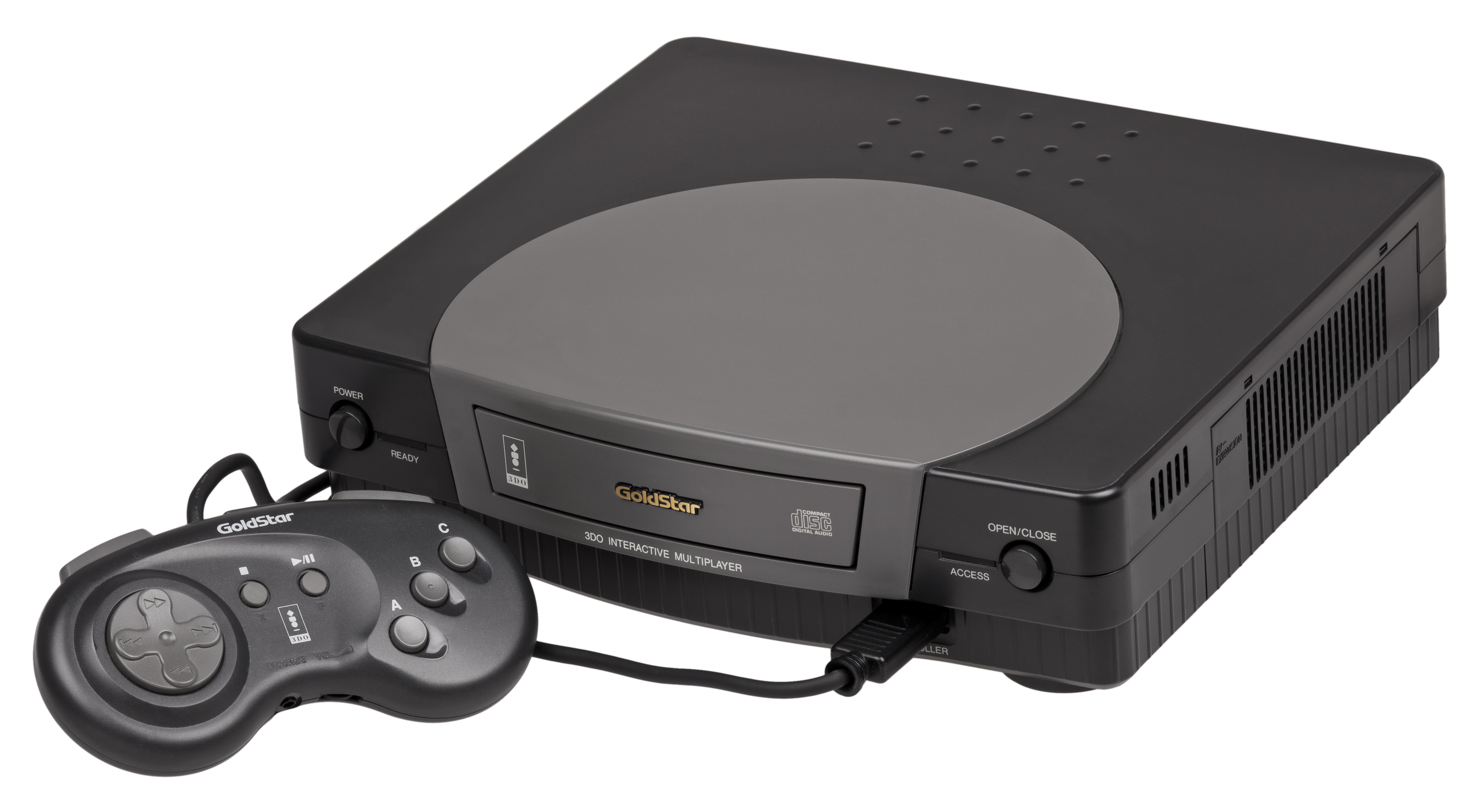
The Goldstar 3DO Interactive Multiplayer

Co-designed by RJ Mical and the team behind the Amiga, and marketed by Electronic Arts founder Trip Hawkins as a format, this "multimedia machine" released in 1993 was marketed as a family entertainment device and not just a video game console. Though it supported a vast library of games including many exceptional third party releases, a refusal to reduce its price of US$699.95 (equivalent to $1,560 in 2025) until almost the end of the product's life hampered sales. The success of subsequent next-generation systems led to the platform's demise and the company's exit from the hardware market. This exit also included The 3DO Company's sale of the platform's successor, the M2, to its investor Matsushita.

== 64DD ==
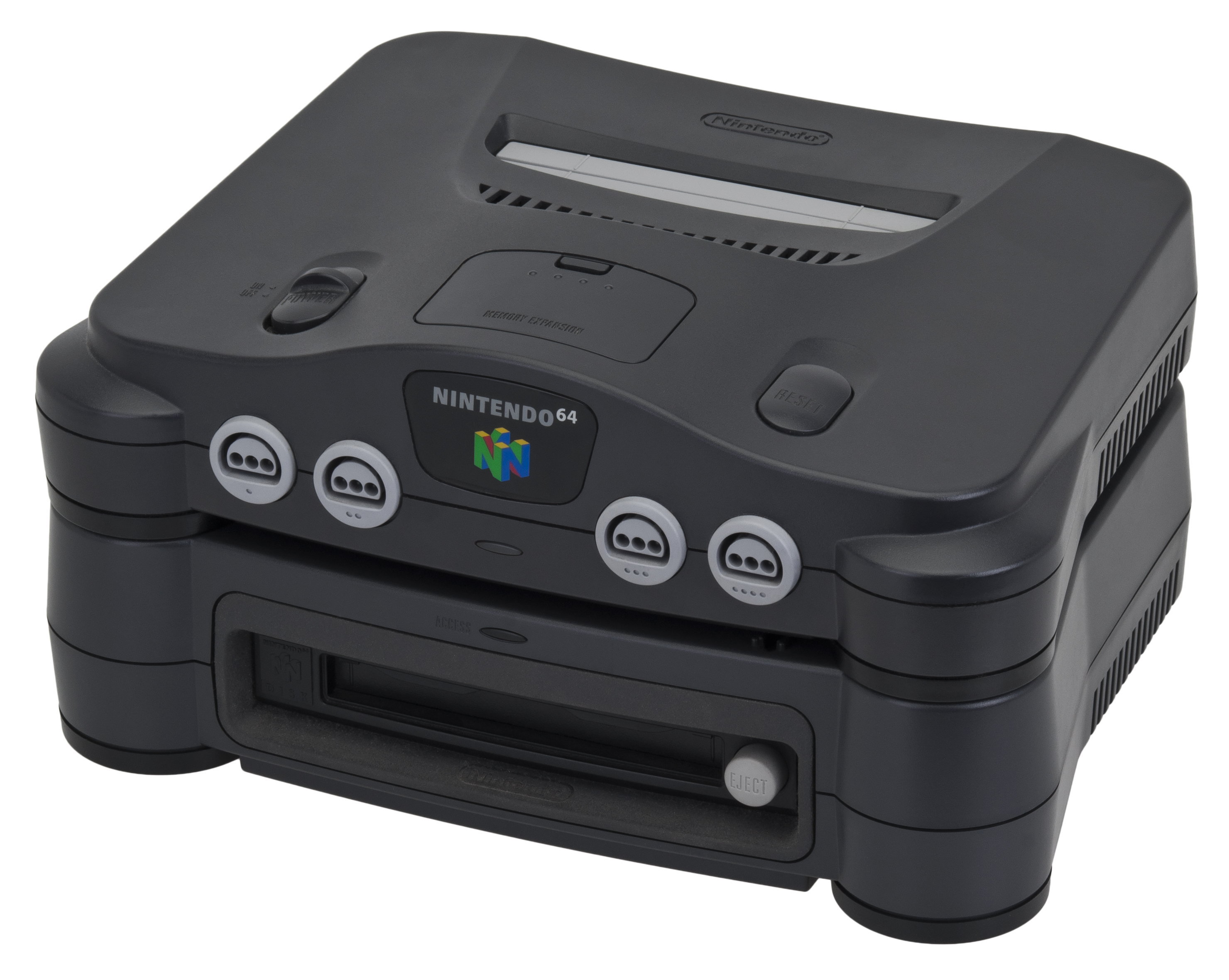
The Nintendo 64 (top) connected to 64DD (bottom)

A disk drive add-on and Internet appliance for the Nintendo 64, it was first announced at Shoshinkai 1995. The 64DD was repeatedly and notoriously delayed until its release in Japan on December 1, 1999. Nintendo, anticipating poor sales, sold the 64DD through mail order and bundled with its Randnet dialup subscription service instead of directly to retailers or consumers. As a result, the 64DD was supported by Nintendo for only a short period of time and only nine games were released for it. It was never released outside Japan. Most 64DD games were either cancelled entirely, released as normal Nintendo 64 cartridges or ported to other systems such as Nintendo's next-generation GameCube. Upon announcement of the cancellation of Randnet in 2001, Nintendo reported a total of 15,000 current 64DD users on Randnet.

== Amstrad GX4000 and Amstrad CPC+ range ==
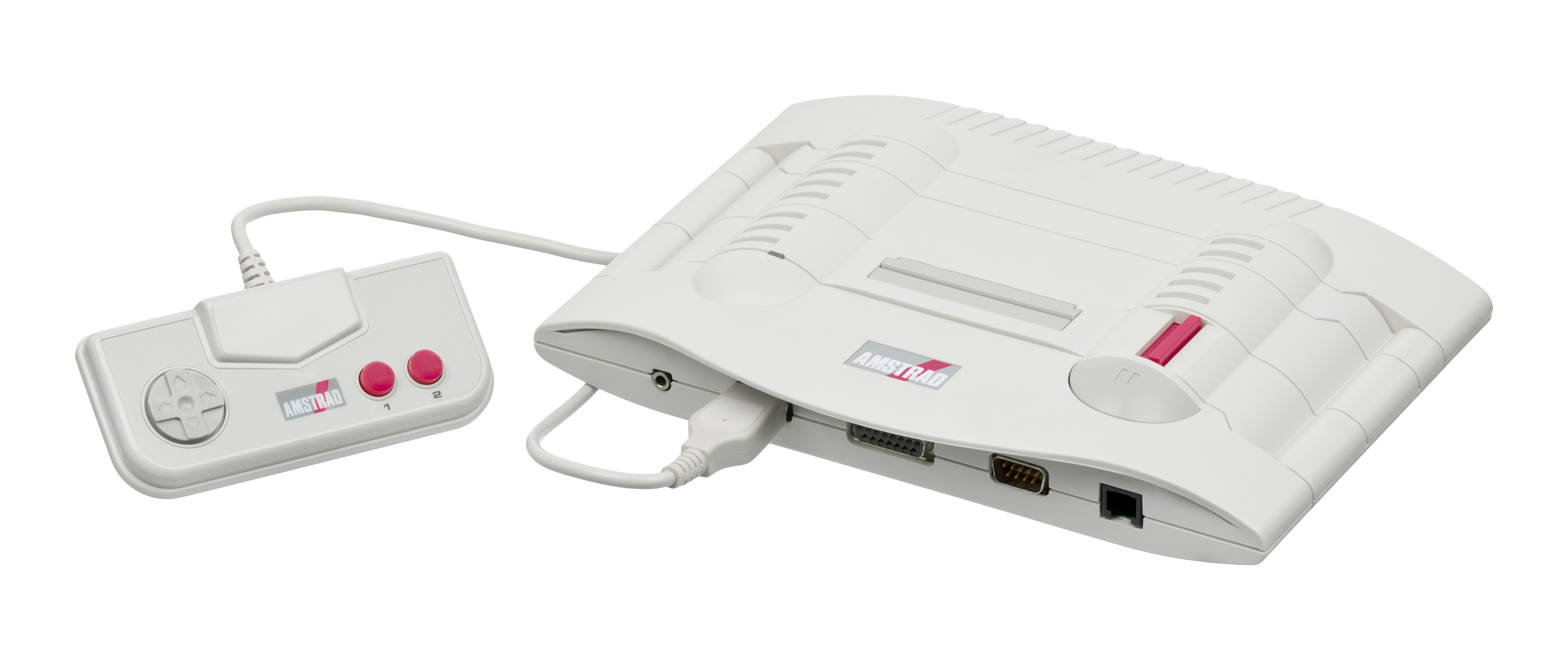
Amstrad GX4000 console

In 1990, Amstrad attempted to enter the console video game market with hardware based on its successful Amstrad CPC range but also capable of playing cartridge-based games with improved graphics and sound. This comprised the Amstrad CPC+ computers, including the same features as the existing CPCs, and the dedicated GX4000 console. However, only a few months later, the Mega Drive, a much-anticipated 16-bit console, was released in Europe, and the GX4000's aging 8-bit technology proved uncompetitive. Many of the games are direct ports of existing CPC games (available more cheaply on tape or disc) with few if any graphical improvements. Fewer than thirty games were released on cartridge, and the GX4000's failure ended Amstrad's involvement in the video game industry. The CPC+ range fared little better, as 8-bit computers had been all but superseded by similarly priced 16-bit machines such as the Amiga, though software hacks now make the advanced console graphics and sound accessible to users.

== Atari 5200 ==
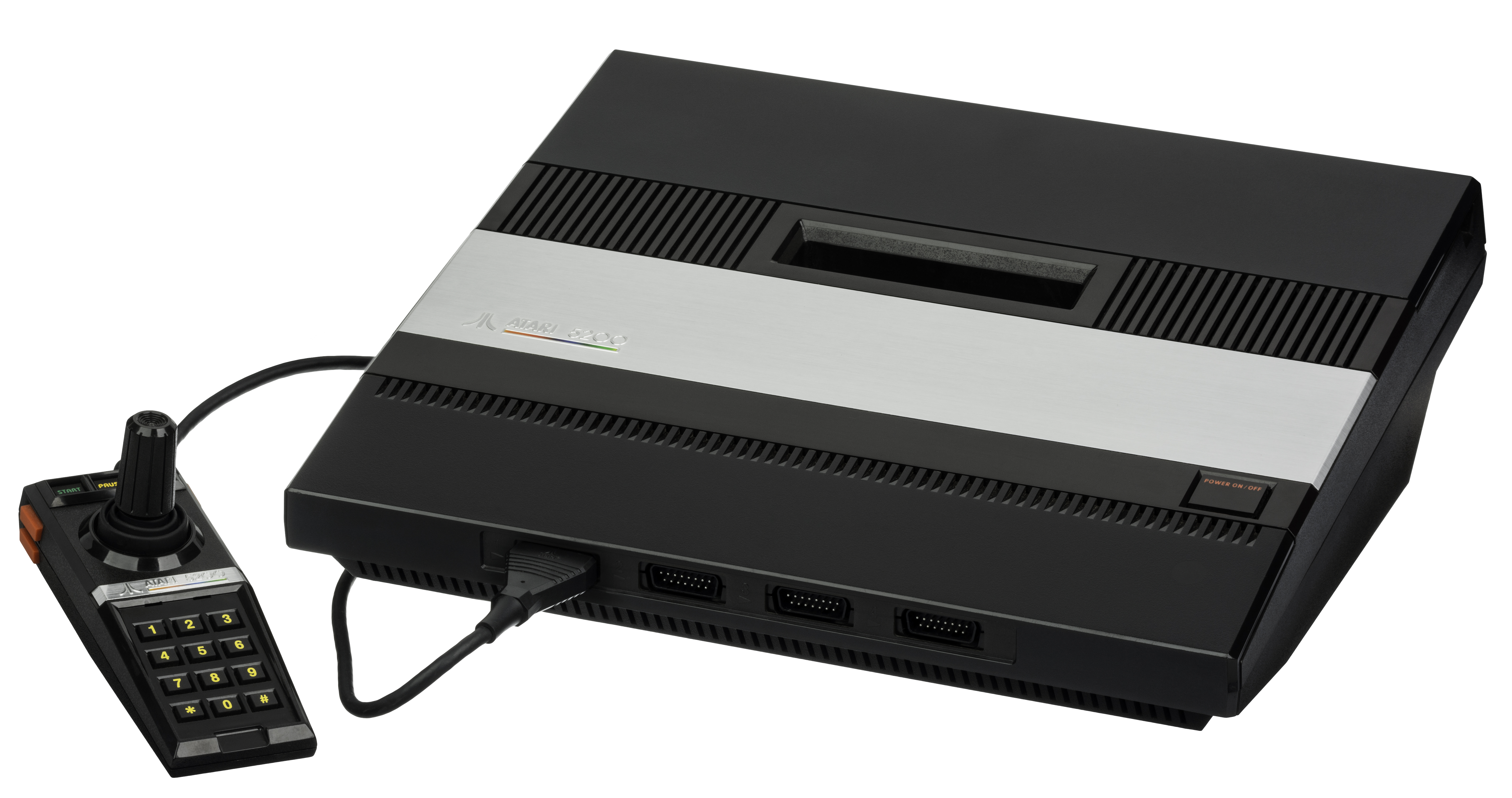
Atari 5200 and The Atari 5200 controller

The Atari 5200 was created as the successor to the highly successful Atari 2600. Reasons for the console's poor reception include that most of the games were simply enhanced versions of those played on its predecessor and the awkward design of the controllers, which themselves were also prone to breaking down. The console sold only a little over a million units. When it was discontinued, its predecessor was marketed for several more years, as was its successor, the Atari 7800, which was marketed more carefully to avoid a similar debacle. Nonetheless, the failure of the Atari 5200 marked the beginning of Atari's fall in the console business.

== Atari Jaguar ==
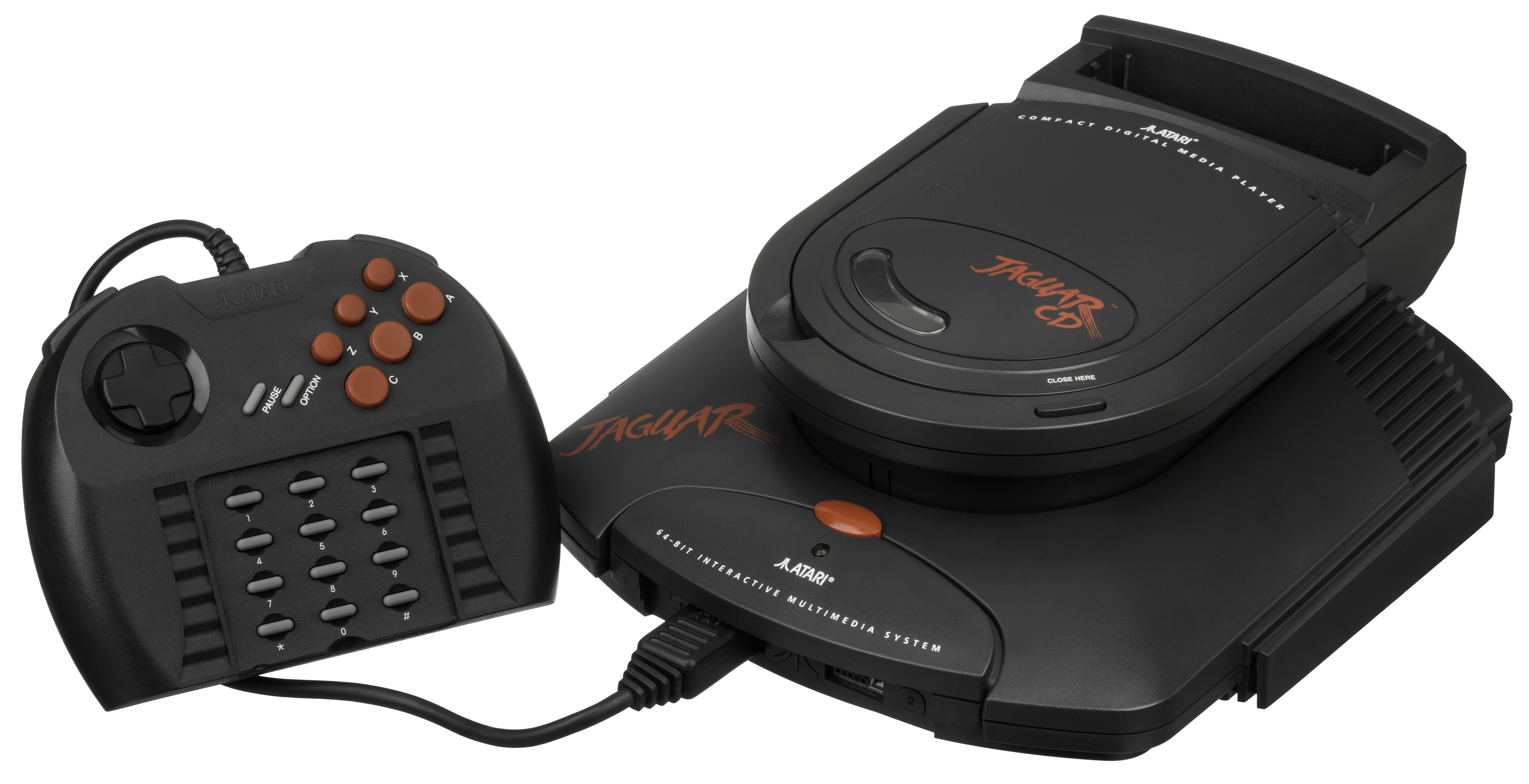
The Atari Jaguar CD with the Pro Controller

Released by Atari Corporation in 1993, this 64-bit system was more powerful than its contemporaries, the Genesis and the Super NES, with support for 3D graphics. Its sales were hurt by a lack of quality games and a number of crippling business practices on the part of Atari senior management. The controller was widely criticized as unwieldy with a baffling number of buttons, and the pack-in game, Cybermorph, was considered disappointing. The system never attained critical mass in the market before the release of the Saturn and PlayStation, and its failure brought the company down with it. Rob Bricken of Topless Robot described the Jaguar as "an unfortunate system, beleaguered by software droughts, rushed releases, and a lot of terrible, terrible games." It would be the last video game console to be produced by an American company until Microsoft's Xbox in 2001.

== Atari Lynx ==
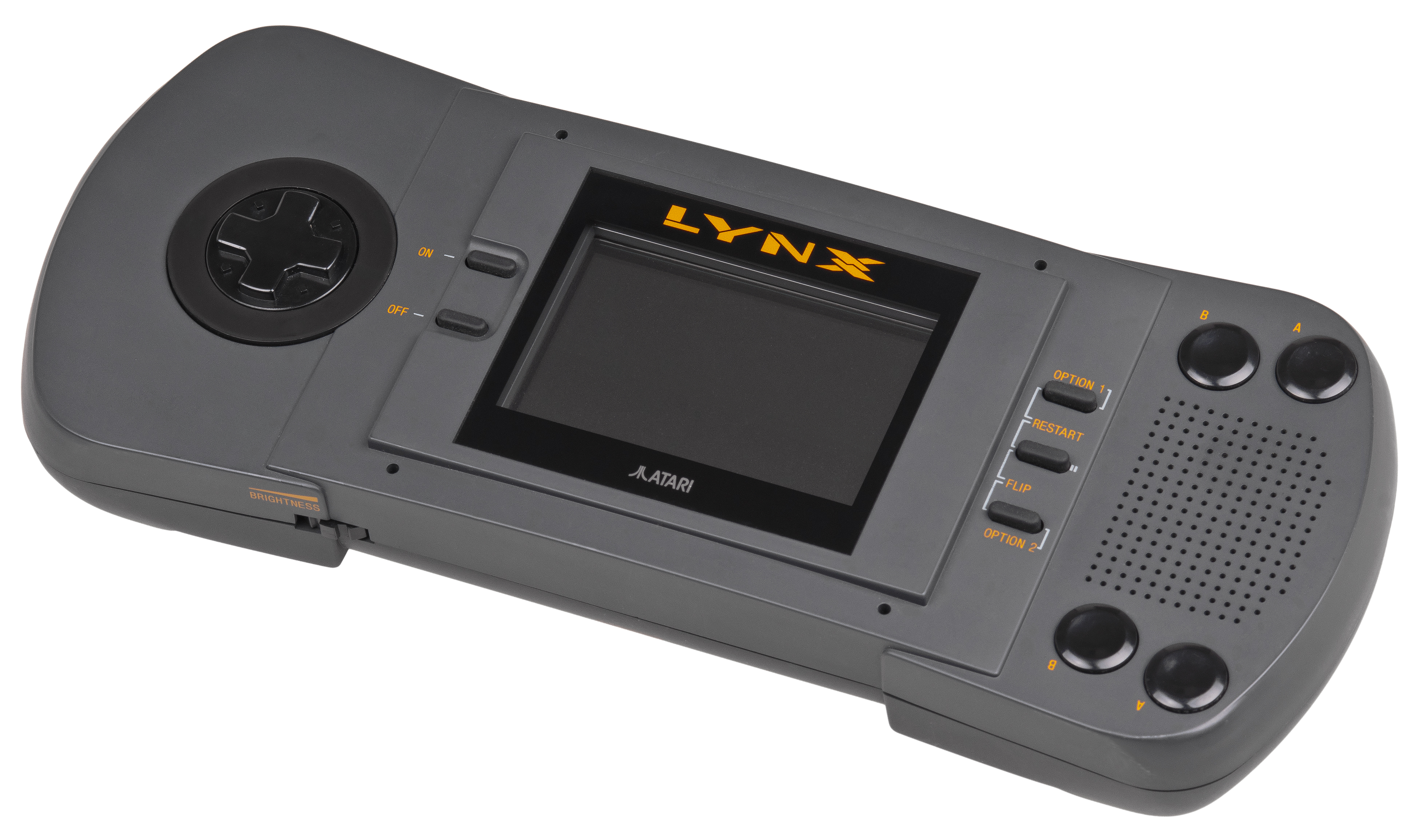
Atari Lynx handheld console

Released in 1989 in North America and Europe, and in Japan in 1990, by Atari Corporation, the Atari Lynx is a handheld game console. It was the first handheld electronic game system with a color LCD display. The system was originally developed by Epyx as the Handy Game. Forward-looking features include 16-bit graphics hardware with a blitter that can scale and distort images, a backlit display, and an ambidextrous controller layout. In late 1991, it was reported that Atari sales estimates were about 800,000, which Atari claimed was within their expected projections. In comparison, the Game Boy sold 16 million units by later that year. Overall lifetime sales were confirmed as being in the region of 3 million, a commercial failure despite positive critical reviews.

== Atari VCS (2021) ==
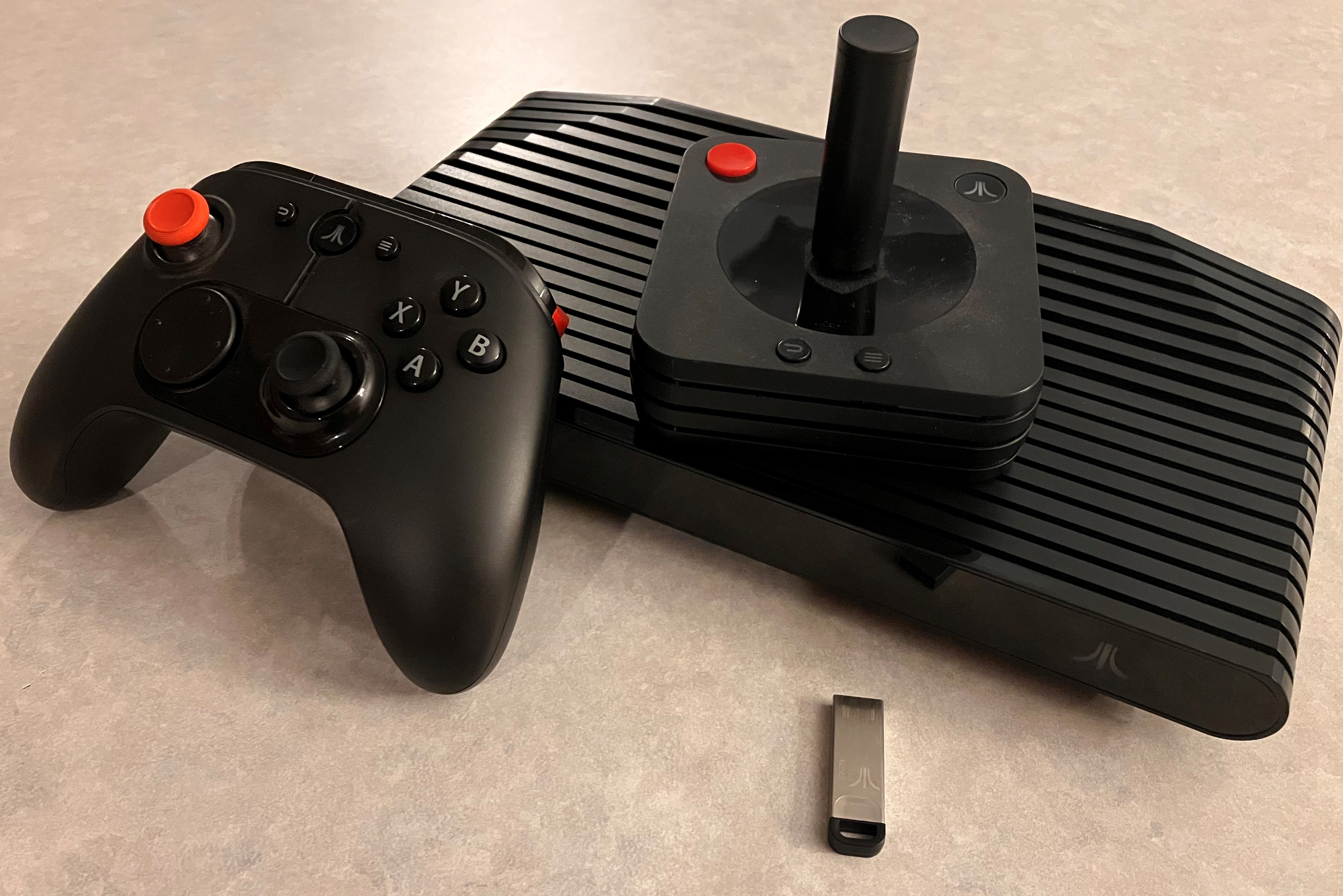
Atari VCS with "Modern Controller" and "Classic Joystick"

The Atari VCS was developed by Atari Inc. to be a microconsole that would support numerous Atari games from its console library as well as other Linux-compatible games. Though announced in 2017 and supported by crowdfunding, publicly available units did not ship until June 2021. The console received lukewarm reception, seen as too costly compared to other consoles on the market without providing similar value. Atari reported a drop of about 90% in hardware revenue between 2021 and 2022, leading them to discontinue production of the unit and evaluating other options.

== CD-i ==
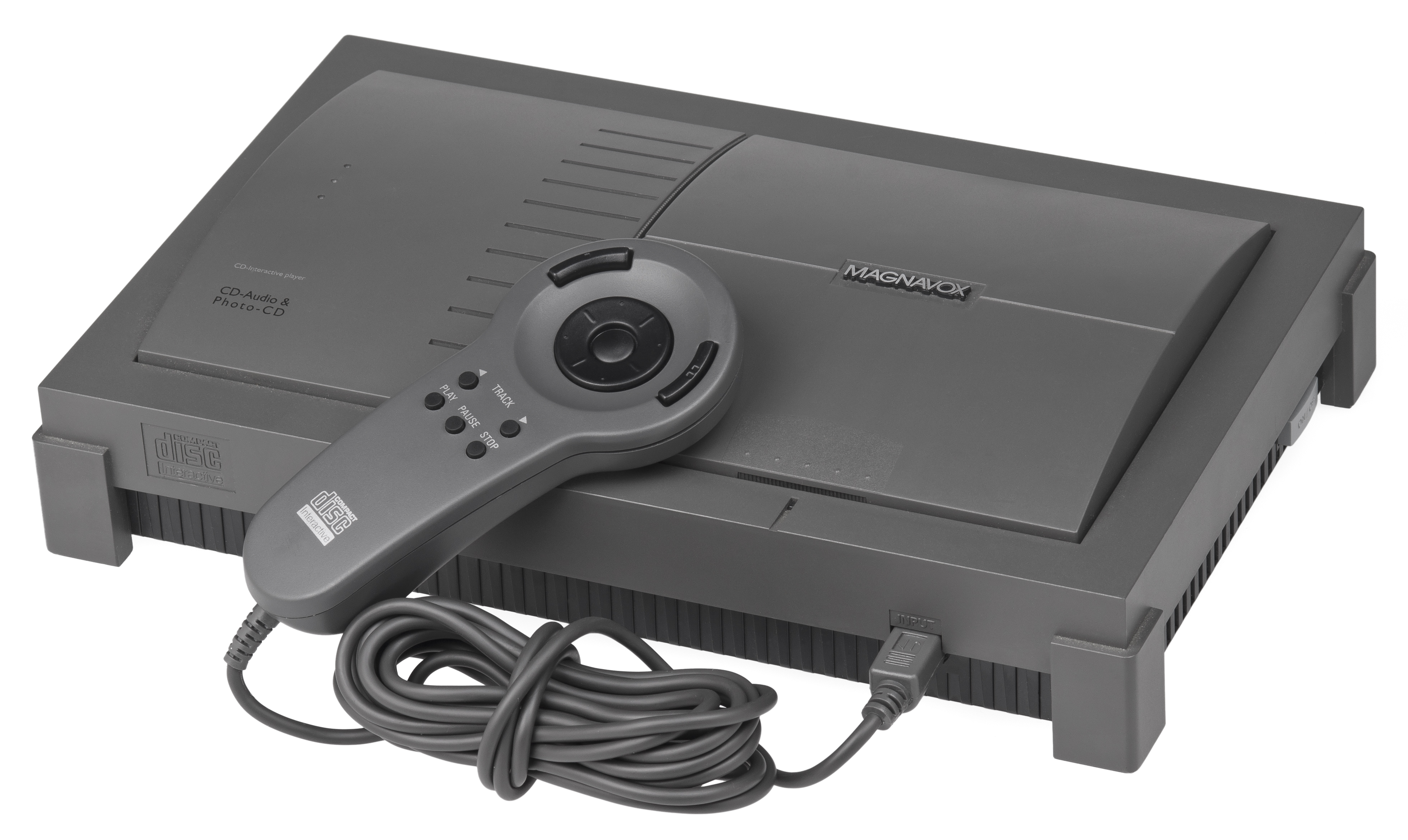
The CD-i received heavy criticism for its lackluster games.

In the 1980s, electronics company Philips together with Sony developed a new CD-based format called CD-i (Compact Disc Interactive) for various multimedia software. The first consumer-oriented player from Philips launched in 1991 with a launch price of $700 (equivalent to $1,650 in 2025). Although not technically a game console, Philips increasingly marketed the format as a video game platform from 1994 onwards. The CD-i has its origins in the Super NES CD-ROM, a project that never came to fruition. Nintendo, however, did give Philips the rights and permission to use five Nintendo characters for the CD-i games. In 1993, Philips released two Zelda games, Link: The Faces of Evil and Zelda: The Wand of Gamelon. A year later, Philips released another Zelda game, Zelda's Adventure, and a few months later, a Mario game titled Hotel Mario. All four of these Nintendo-themed games are commonly cited by critics as being among the worst ever made. Much criticism was also aimed at the CD-i's controller. Although the Philips CD-i was extensively marketed by Philips, consumer interest remained low. Sales began to slow down by 1994, and in 1998, Philips announced that the product had been discontinued. In all, roughly 570,000 units were sold, with 133 games released.

== Commodore 64 Games System ==
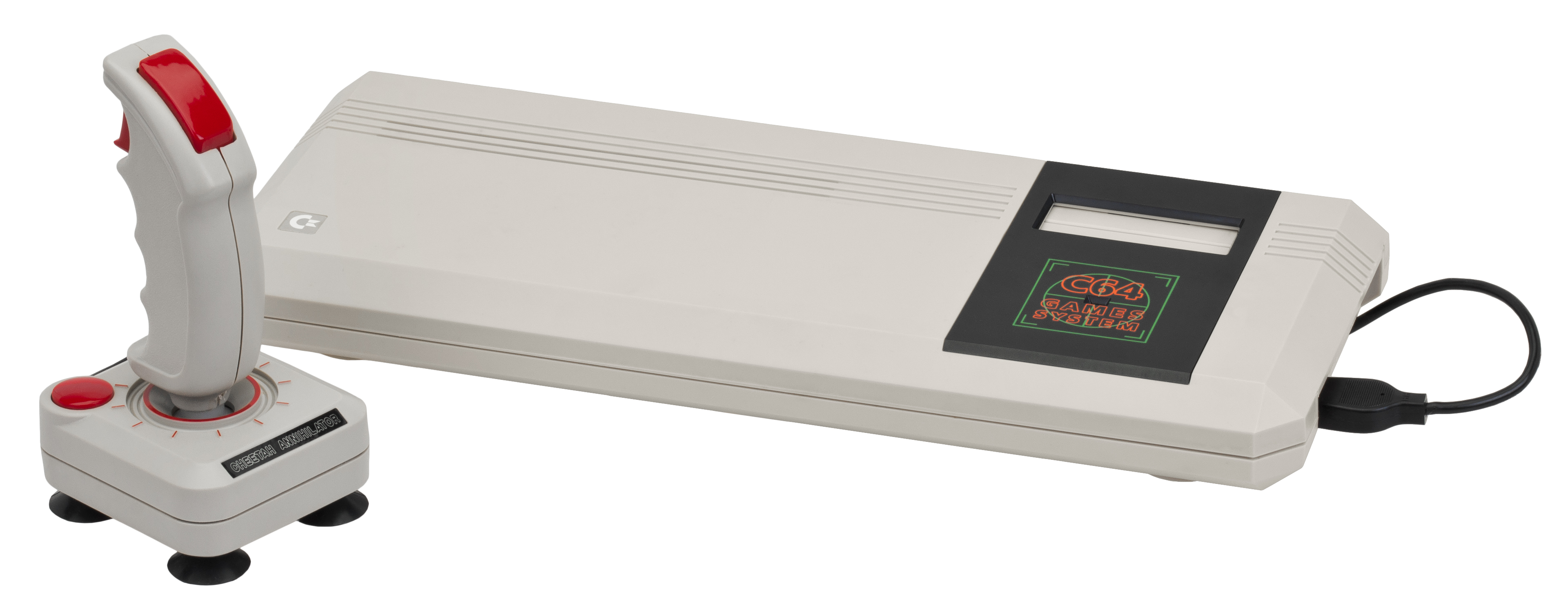
Commodore 64 console

Released only in Europe in 1990, the C64GS was basically a Commodore 64 redesigned as a cartridge-based console. Aside from some hardware issues, the console did not get much attention from the public, who preferred to buy the cheaper original computer that had far more possibilities. Also, the console appeared just as the fourth generation of video game consoles was starting, which left no chance for it to succeed as it was unable to compete with consoles like the Super Nintendo Entertainment System and Mega Drive.

== Commodore CDTV ==
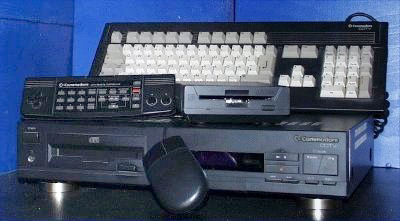
Commodore CDTV

The CDTV was launched by Commodore in 1991. In common with the Philips CD-i and the 3DO, the CDTV was intended as an all-in-one home multimedia appliance that would play games, music, movies, and other interactive content. The name was short for "Commodore Dynamic Total Vision". The hardware was based on the Amiga 500 computer with a single-speed CD-ROM drive rather than a floppy disk drive, in a case that was designed to integrate unobtrusively with a home entertainment center. However, the expected market for home multimedia appliances did not materialize, and the CDTV was discontinued in 1993, having sold only 30,000 units. Commodore's next attempt at a CD-based console, the Amiga CD32, was considerably more successful.

== digiBlast ==
The digiBlast portable console was launched by Nikko at the end of 2005 and promised to be a cheap alternative (selling at $117.86 or thereabouts and featuring a hardware similar to the Game Boy Advance) to the Nintendo DS and PlayStation Portable. Cartridges for games, cartoon episodes (Winx Club, SpongeBob SquarePants), and music videos were released on the handheld. A cartridge for MP3 playback and a cartridge with a 1.3-megapixel camera were released as add-ons. However, a shortage of chips around the release date resulted in a failed launch and loss of consumer interest.

== Dreamcast ==
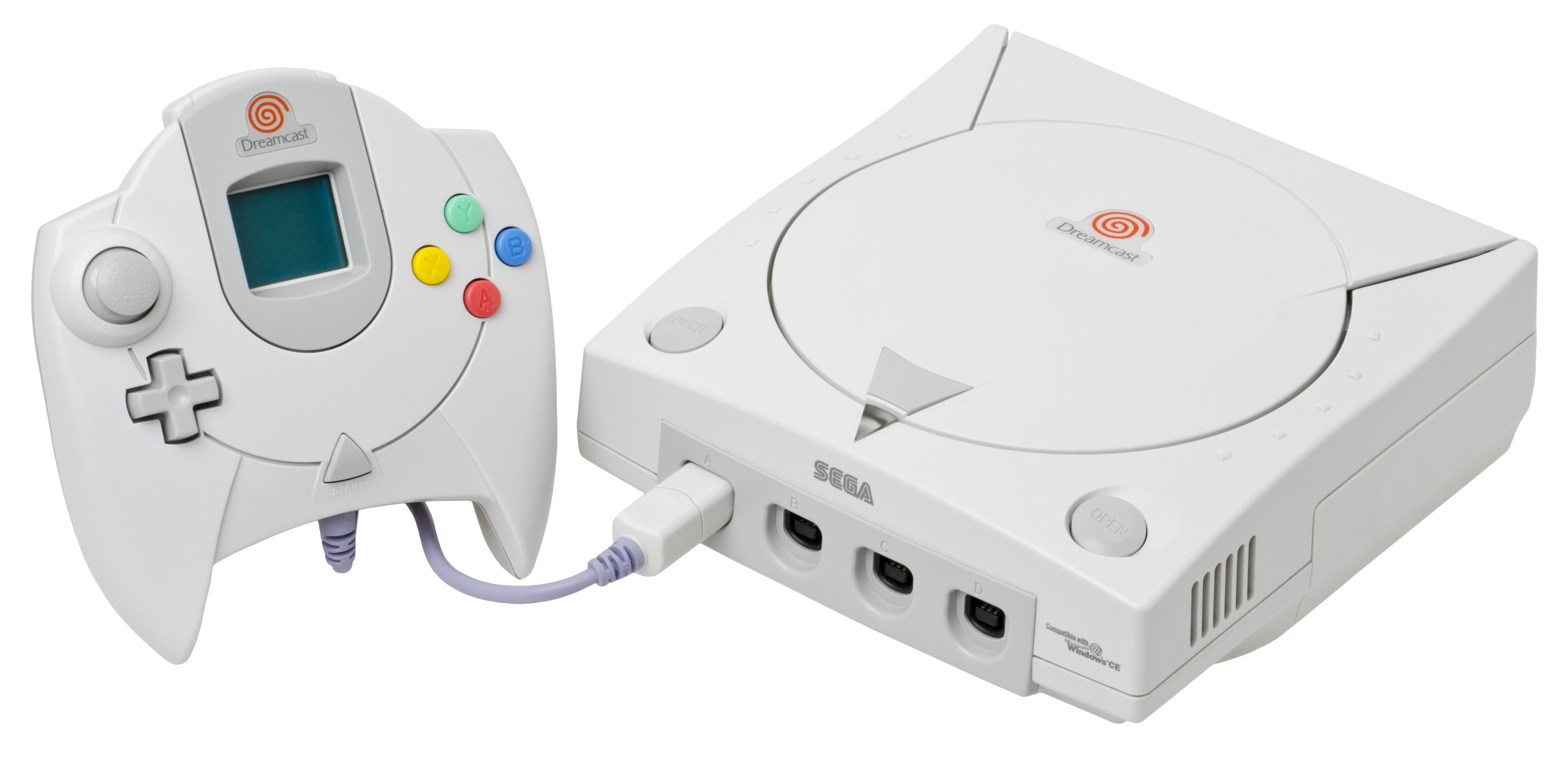
Sega Dreamcast and controller. The Dreamcast served as Sega's final console.

The Dreamcast, released globally in 1999, was Sega's final console before the company focused entirely on software. Although the console was initially successful and management in the company improved significantly after harsh lessons were learned from the Sega Saturn fiasco, the console also faced stiff competition, especially from the technically superior PlayStation 2 despite being in the market over a year ahead. The Dreamcast sold less than the Saturn, coming in at 9.13 million units compared to the Saturn's 9.26 million. The console's development was subject to further stress by an economic recession that struck Japan shortly after the console's release, forcing Sega, among other companies, to cut costs to survive and refocusing solely on software as a result.

== Fairchild Channel F ==
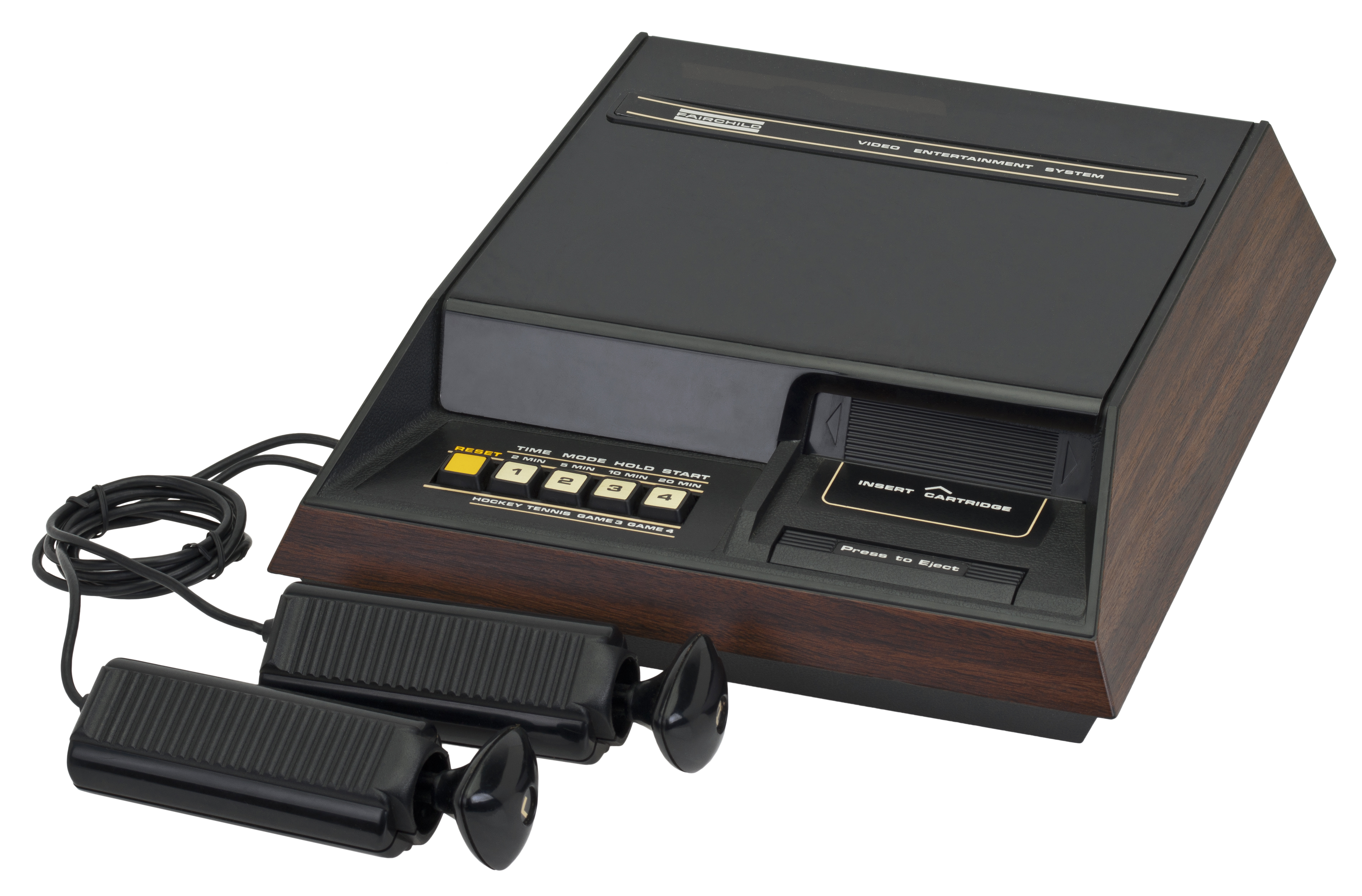
The Fairchild Channel F and its 2 controllers.

The Fairchild Channel F was a second-generation console released in 1976, and the first home console unit to use interchangeable video game cartridges. It had respectable sales within its first year on the market, but soon faced competition from the Atari 2600, another cartridge-based system that was released in September 1977. Whereas the Channel F's games were generally based on intellectual and educational concepts, Atari had crafted games that were conversions of their action-based arcade video game hits, and were more popular, making the Atari 2600 the more popular system. By the end of 1977, the Atari 2600 sold about 400,000 total units compared to the 250,000 units of the Channel F. Fairchild's attempts to make more action-oriented games in 1978 failed to draw consumers to the system, and the console was completely overshadowed. By the time Fairchild sold the console technology to Zircon International in 1979, only 350,000 Channel F units had been sold in its lifetime.

== Game Boy Micro ==
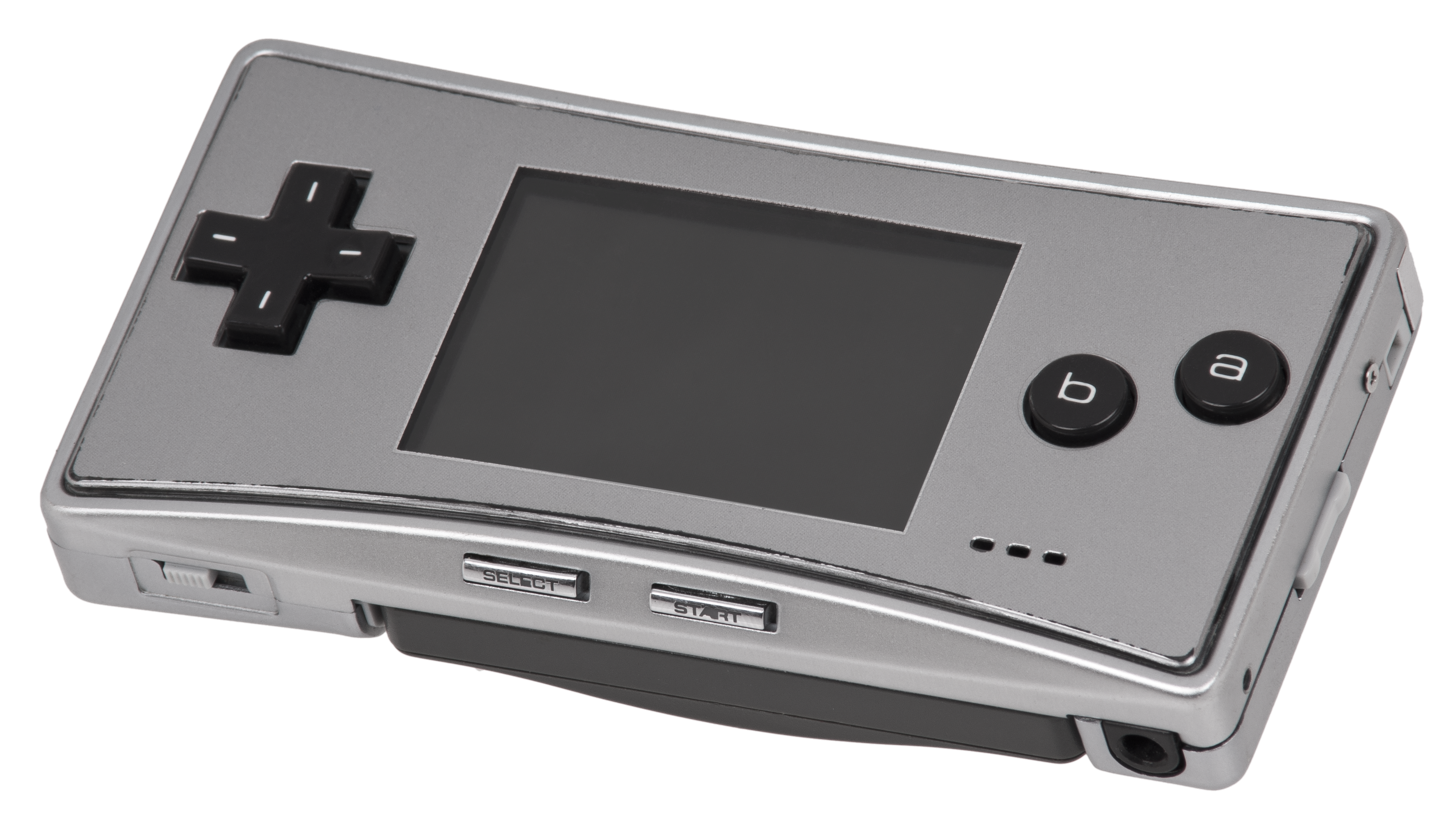
Game Boy Micro handheld console.

The Game Boy Micro is a 32-bit handheld game console made by Nintendo and was the last in the Game Boy family. It was released in Japan on September 13, 2005, and to international markets later that year. It is a miniaturized version of the Game Boy Advance. It sold only 2.42 million units and was discontinued in 2008. Satoru Iwata stated that the marketing of the Nintendo DS may have hurt the Micro in the marketplace and admitted that Game Boy Micro sales did not meet Nintendo's expectations.

== Genesis Nomad ==
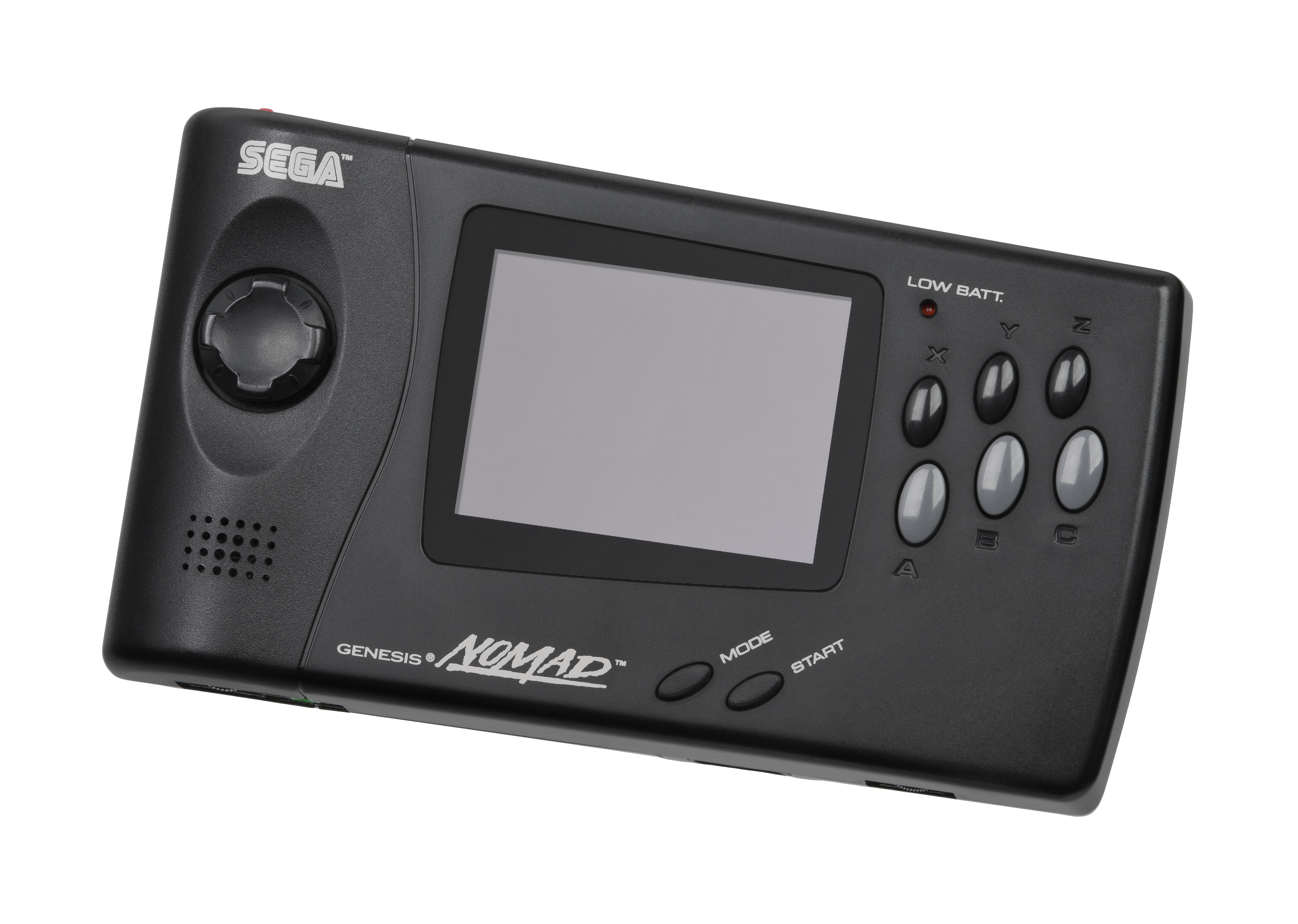
Sega Nomad handheld console

The Nomad, a handheld game console by Sega released in North America in October 1995, is a portable variation of Sega's home console, the Genesis (known as the Mega Drive outside of North America). Designed from the Mega Jet, a portable version of the home console designed for use on airline flights in Japan, Nomad served to succeed the Game Gear and was the last handheld console released by Sega. Released late in the Genesis era, the Nomad had a short lifespan. Sold exclusively in North America, the Nomad was never officially released worldwide, and employs regional lockout. The handheld itself was incompatible with several Genesis peripherals, including the Power Base Converter, the Sega CD, and the Sega 32X. The release was five years into the market span of the Genesis, with an existing library of more than 500 Genesis games. With the Nomad's late release several months after the launch of the Saturn, this handheld is said to have suffered from its poorly timed launch. Sega decided to stop focusing on the Genesis in 1999, several months before the release of the Dreamcast, by which time the Nomad was being sold at less than a third of its original price. Reception for the Nomad is mixed between its uniqueness and its poor timing into the market. Blake Snow of GamePro listed the Nomad as fifth on his list of the "10 Worst-Selling Handhelds of All Time", criticizing its poor timing into the market, inadequate advertising, and poor battery life.

== Gizmondo ==
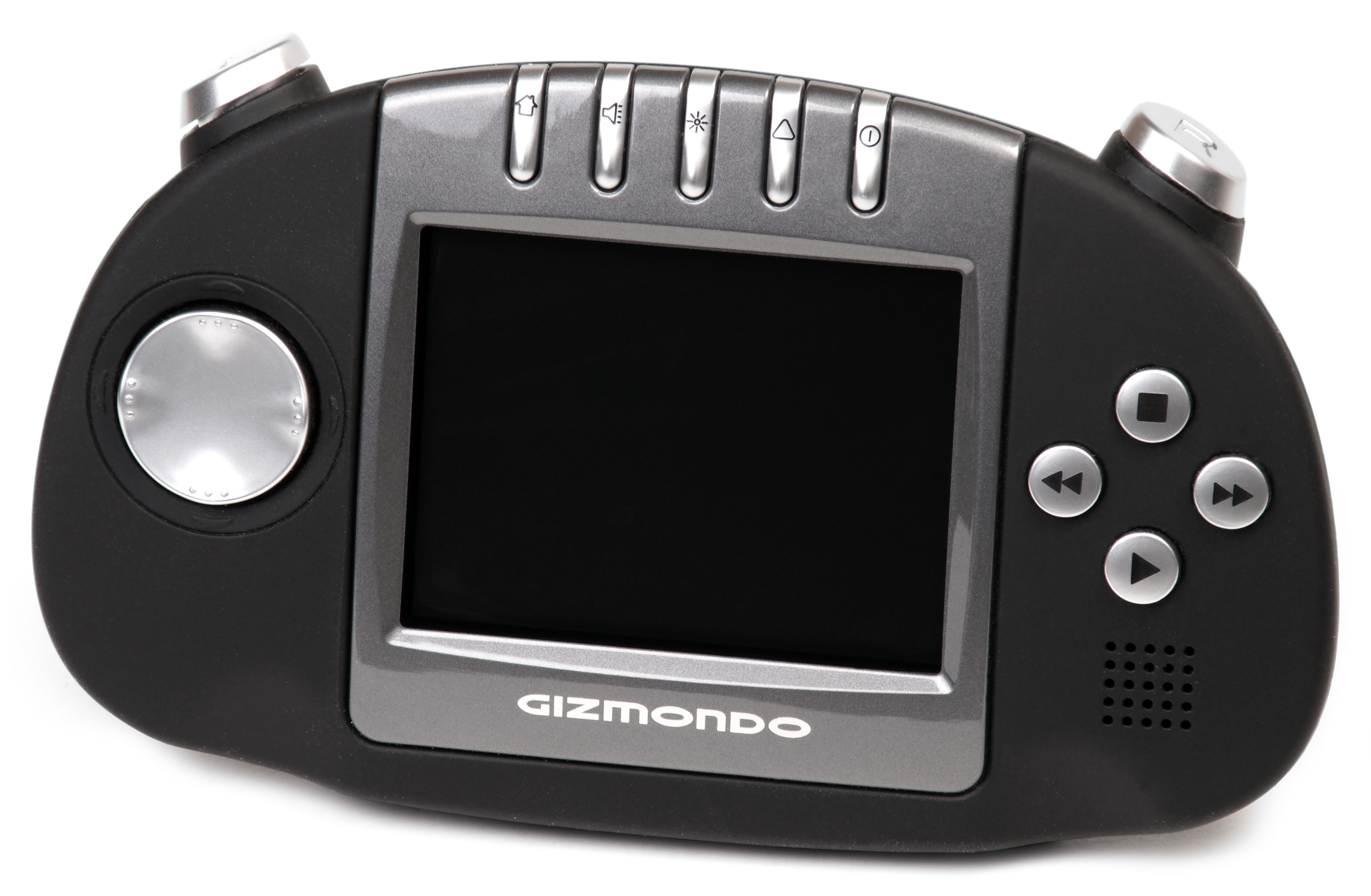
Gizmondo handheld console

The Gizmondo, a handheld video game device featuring GPS and a digital camera, was released by Tiger Telematics in the UK, Sweden and the U.S. starting in March 2005. With poor promotion, few games (only fourteen were ever released), short battery life, a small screen, competition from the cheaper and more reputable Nintendo DS and PSP, and controversy surrounding the company, the system was a commercial failure. Several high-ranking Tiger executives were subsequently arrested for fraud and other illegal activities related to the Gizmondo. It is so far the world's worst selling handheld console in history, and due to its failure in the European and American video game markets, it was released neither in Australia nor in Japan. Tiger Telematics went bankrupt when it was discontinued in February 2006, just 11 months after it was released.

== HyperScan ==
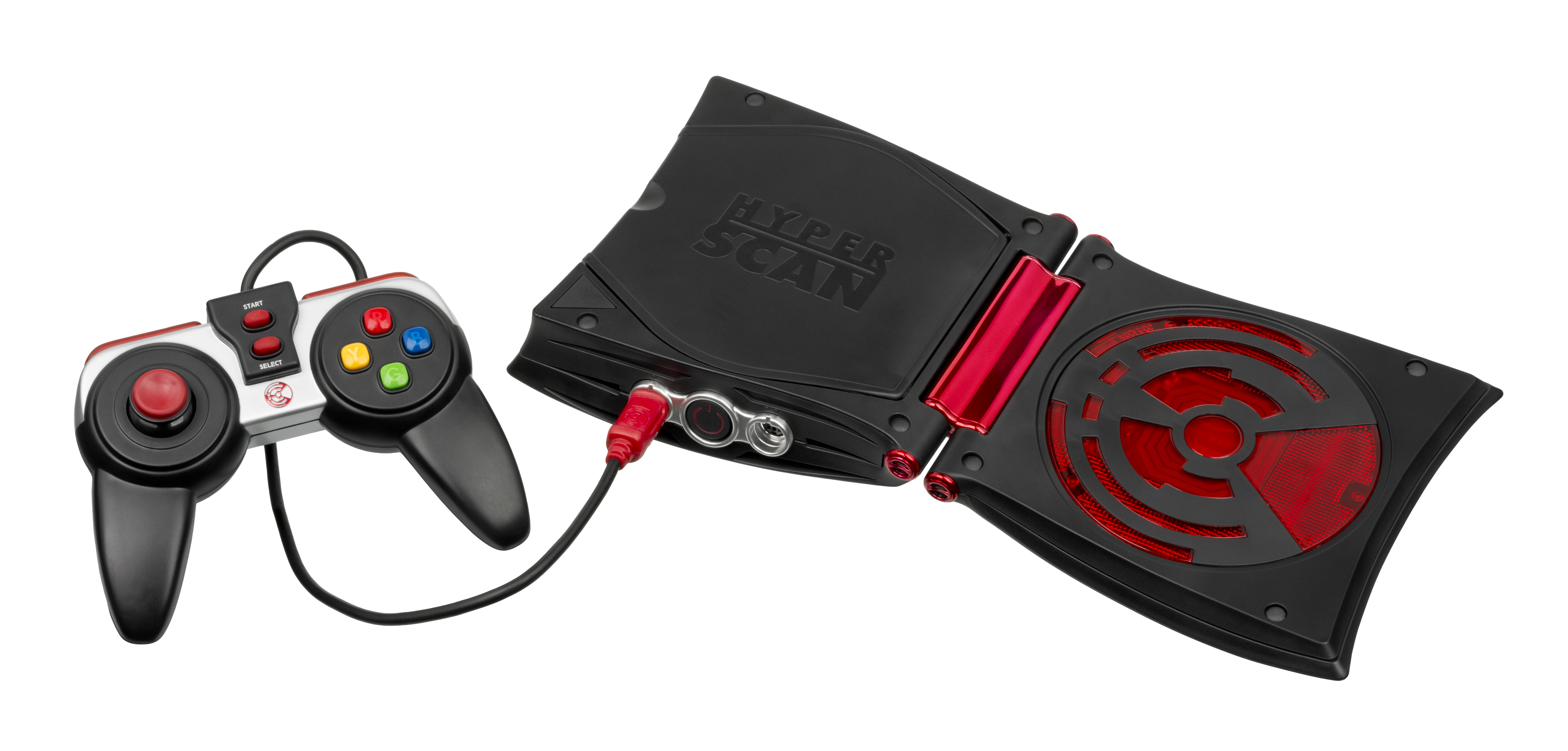
Mattel HyperScan console

Released in late 2006 by Mattel, the HyperScan was the company's first video game console since the Intellivision. It used radio frequency identification (RFID) along with traditional video game technology. The console used UDF format CD-ROMs. Games retailed for $19.99 and the console itself for $69.99 at launch, but at the end of its very short lifespan, prices of the system were down to $9.99, the games $1.99, and booster packs $0.99. The system was sold in two varieties, a cube, and a 2-player value pack. The cube box version was the version sold in stores. It included the system, controller, an X-Men game disc, and 6 X-Men cards. Two player value packs were sold online (but may have been liquidated in stores) and included an extra controller and 12 additional X-Men cards. The system was discontinued in 2007 due to poor console, game, and card pack sales. It is featured as one of the ten worst systems ever by PC World magazine.

== LaserActive ==
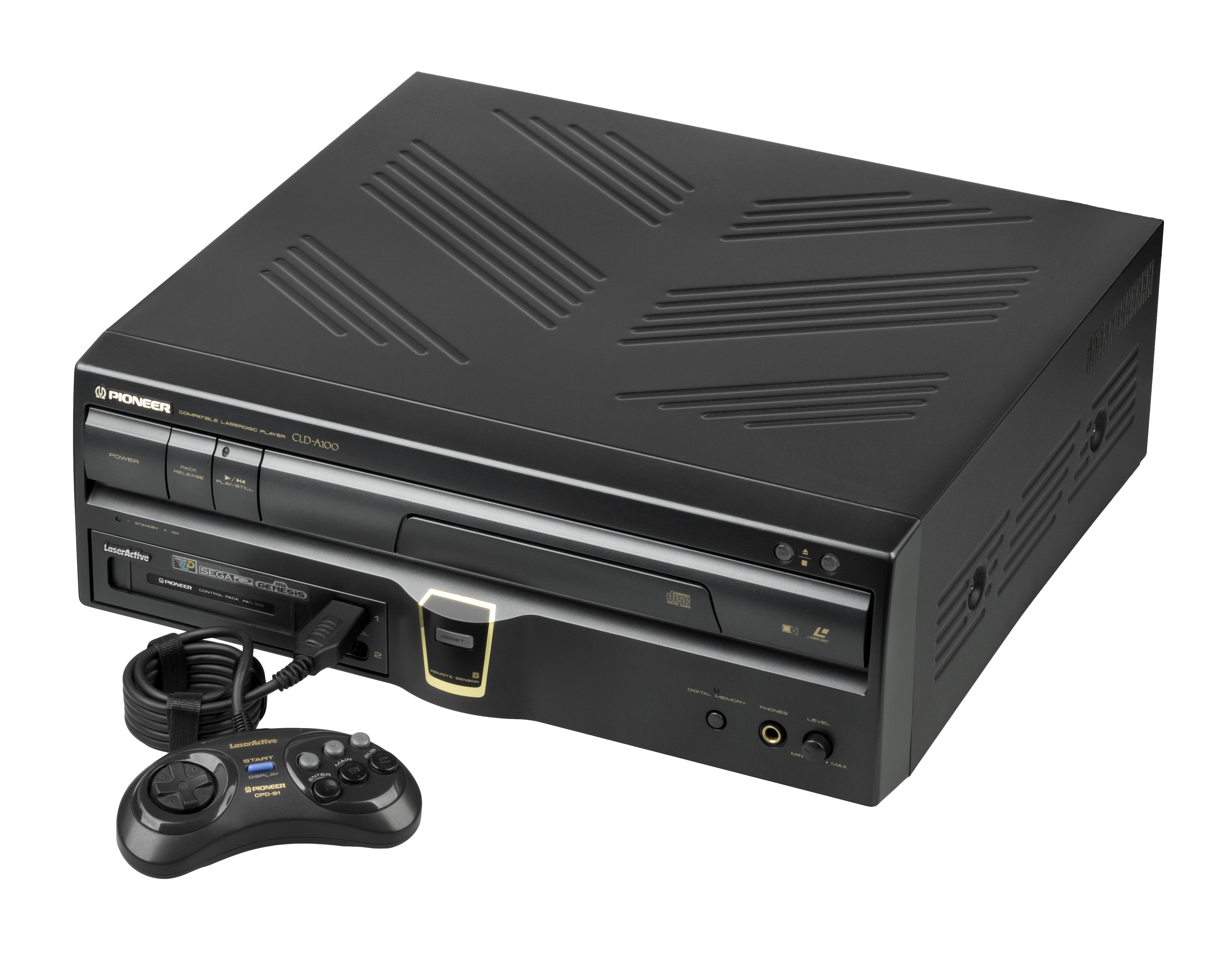
Pioneer LaserActive and controller

Made by Pioneer Corporation in 1993 (a clone was produced by NEC as well), the LaserActive employed the trademark LaserDiscs as a medium for presenting games and also played the original LaserDisc movies. The LD-ROMs, as they were called, could hold 540 MB of data and up to 60 minutes of analog audio and video. In addition, expansion modules could be bought which allowed the LaserActive to play Genesis and/or TurboGrafx-16 games, among other things. Poor marketing combined with a high price tag for both the console itself at US$969 (equivalent to $2,160 in 2025) and the various modules (e.g., $599 for the Genesis module compared to $89 for the base console and $229 for Sega CD add-on to play CD-ROM based games) caused it to be quickly ignored by both the gaming public and the video game press. Fewer than 40 games were produced in all (at about $120 each), almost all of which required the purchase of one of the modules, and games built for one module could not be used with another. The LaserActive was quietly discontinued one year later after total sales of roughly 10,000 units.

== Neo Geo CD ==
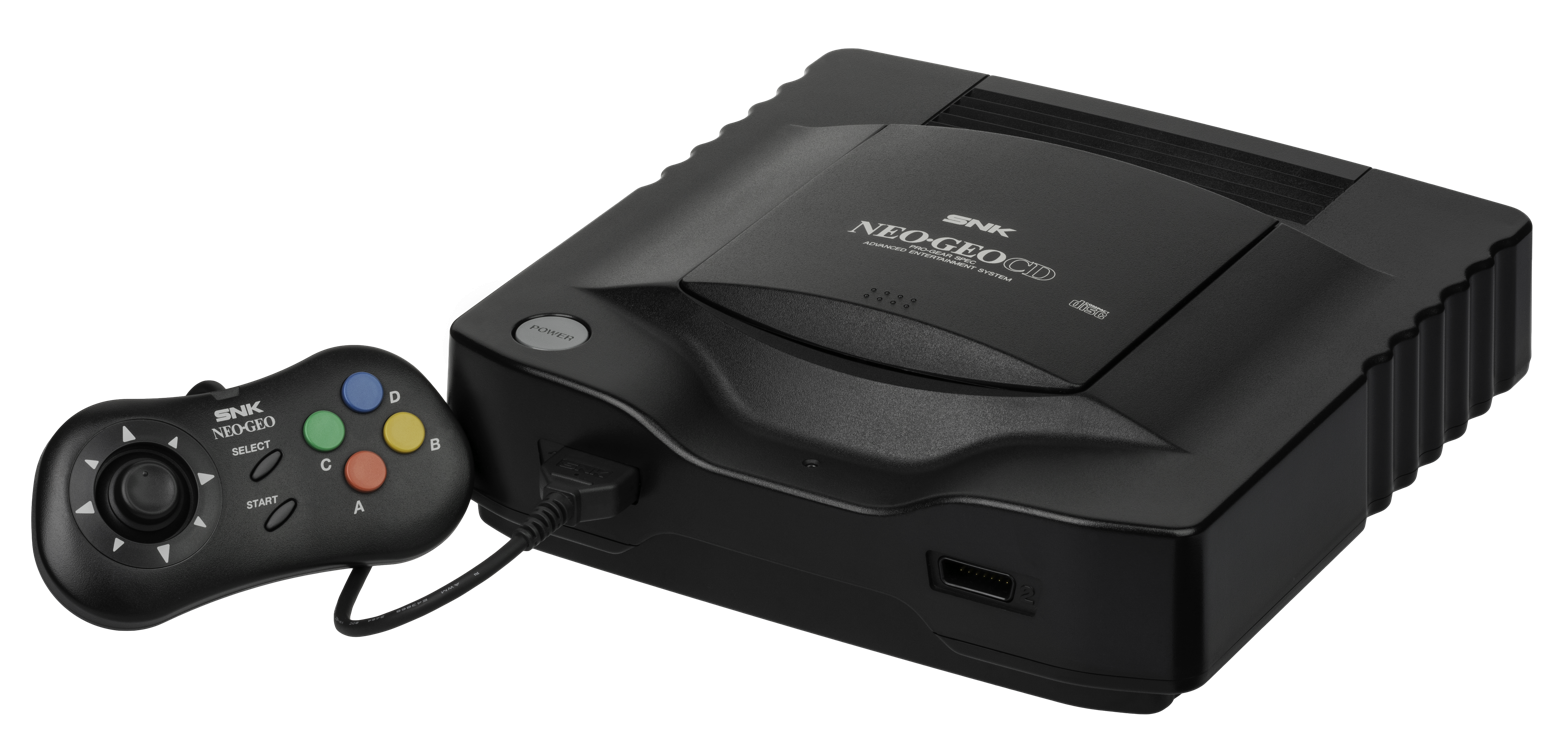
Neo Geo CD and controller

Released in Japan and Europe in 1994 and a year later in North America, the Neo Geo CD was first unveiled at the 1994 Tokyo Toy Show. Three versions of the Neo Geo CD were released: a front-loading version only distributed in Japan, a top-loading version marketed worldwide, and the Neo Geo CDZ, an upgraded, faster-loading version released in Japan only. The front-loading version was the original console design, with the top-loading version developed shortly before the Neo Geo CD launch as a scaled-down, cheaper alternative model. The CDZ was released on December 29, 1995 as the Japanese market replacement for SNK's previous efforts (the "front loader" and the "top loader"). The Neo Geo CD had met with limited success due to it being plagued with slow loading times that could vary from 30 to 60 seconds between loads, depending on the game. Although SNK's American home entertainment division quickly acknowledged that the system simply was unable to compete with the 3D-able powerhouse systems of the day like Nintendo's 64, Sega's Saturn and Sony's PlayStation, SNK corporate of Japan felt they could continue to maintain profitable sales in the Japanese home market by shortening the previous system's load-times. Their Japanese division had produced an excess number of single speed units and found that modifying these units to double speed was more expensive than they had initially thought, so SNK opted to sell them as they were, postponing production of a double speed model until they had sold off the stock of single speed units. As of March 1997, the Neo Geo CD had sold 570,000 units worldwide. Although this was the last known home console released under SNK's Neo Geo line, the newly reincarnated SNK Playmore relaunched the Neo Geo line with the release of the Neo Geo X in 2012. In April 2019, SNK announced at a conference in Seoul that they plan to release a Neo Geo 2 console and later a Neo Geo 3. They plan for the Neo Geo 2 to be a semi open platform console, where they will be built in games, as well as additional games that can be purchased separately. These are planned to be spiritual successors to the original Neo Geo arcade and home systems.

== Neo Geo Pocket and Pocket Color ==
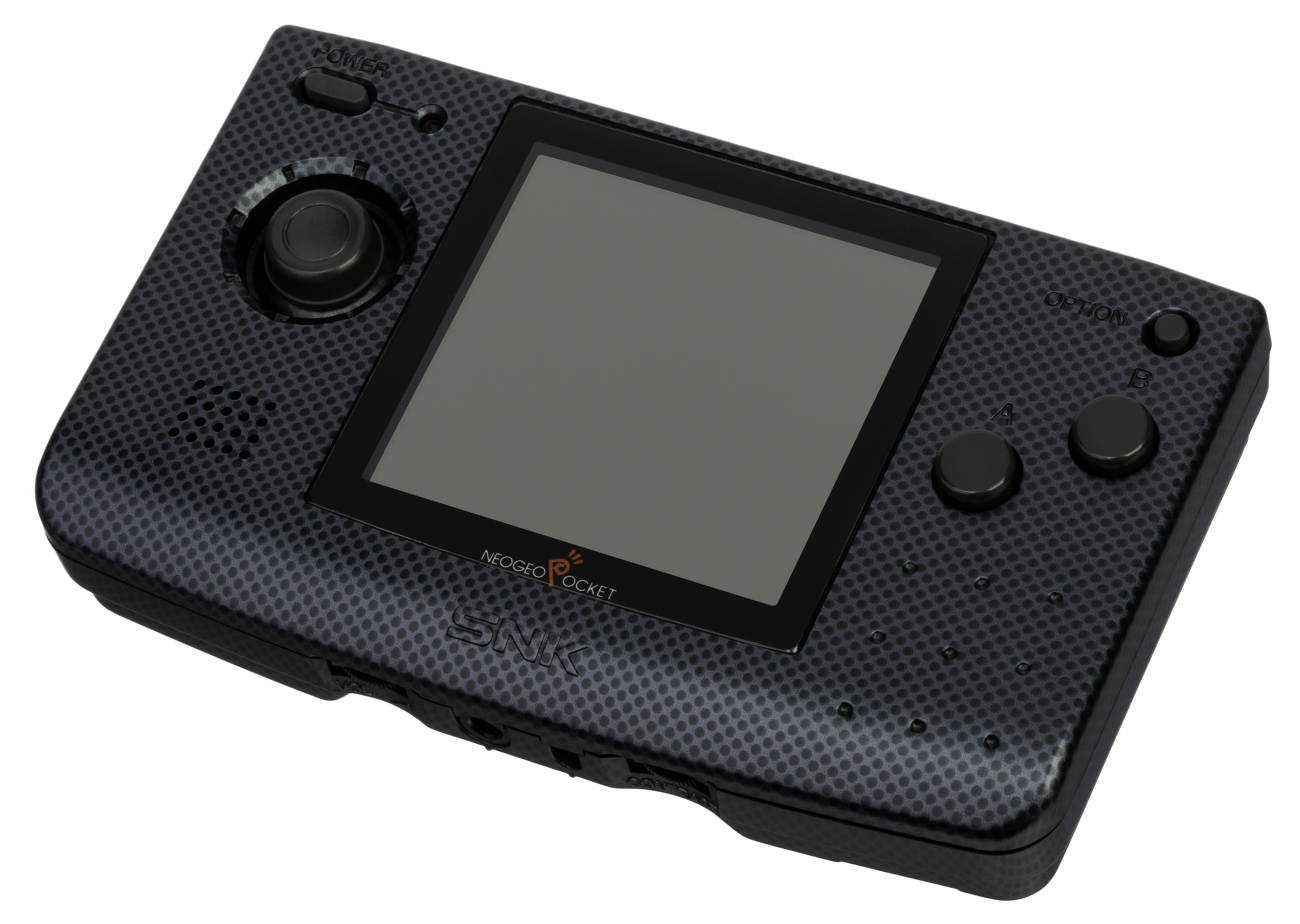
Neo Geo Pocket handheld

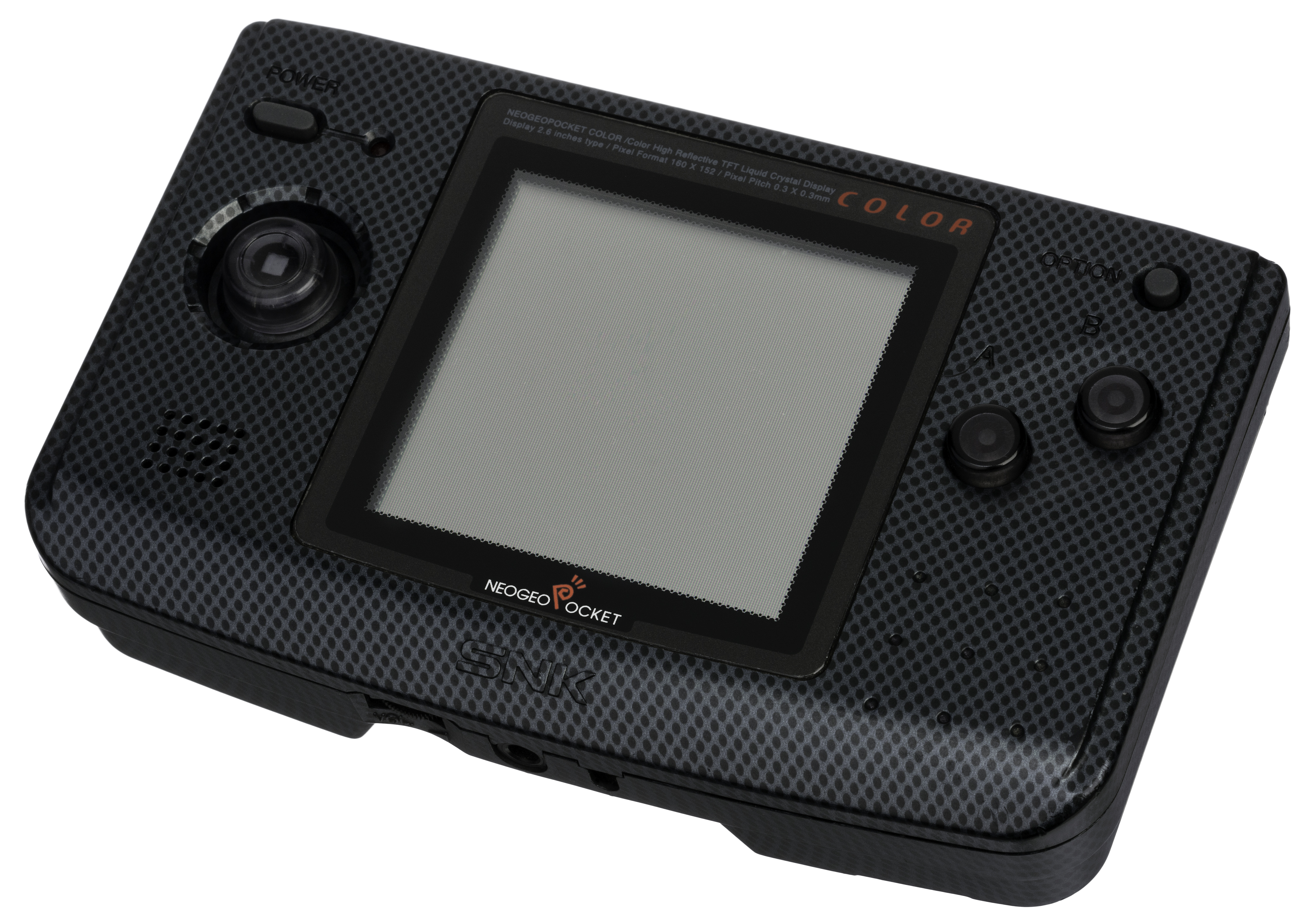
Neo Geo Pocket color handheld

The two handheld video game consoles, created by SNK, were released between 1998 and 1999 through markets dominated by Nintendo. The Neo Geo Pocket is considered to be an unsuccessful console, as it was immediately succeeded by the Color, a full color device allowing the system to compete more easily with the dominant Game Boy Color handheld, and which also saw a western release. Though the system enjoyed only a short life, there were some significant games released on the system. After a good sales start in both the U.S. and Japan with 14 launch titles (a record at the time) subsequent low retail support in the U.S., lack of communication with third-party developers by SNK's American management, the craze about Nintendo's Pokémon franchise, anticipation of the 32-bit Game Boy Advance, as well as strong competition from Bandai's WonderSwan in Japan, led to a sales decline in both regions. Meanwhile, SNK had been in financial trouble for at least a year – the company soon collapsed, and was purchased by American pachinko manufacturer Aruze in January 2000. Eventually on June 13, 2000, Aruze decided to quit the North American and European markets, marking the end of SNK's worldwide operations and the discontinuation of Neo Geo hardware and software there. The Neo Geo Pocket Color (and other SNK/Neo Geo products) did however, last until 2001 in Japan. It was SNK's last video game console, as the company filed for bankruptcy on October 22, 2001. Though commercially failed, the Neo Geo Pocket and Pocket Color had been regarded as influential systems. It also featured an arcade-style microswitched 'clicky stick' joystick, which was praised for its accuracy and being well-suited for fighting games. The Pocket Color system's display and 40-hour battery life were also well received. Although these were the last known systems released under SNK's Neo Geo line, the newly reincarnated SNK Playmore relaunched the Neo Geo line with the release of the Neo Geo X in 2012. In April 2019, SNK announced at a conference in Seoul that they plan to release a Neo Geo 2 console and later a Neo Geo 3. They plan for the Neo Geo 2 to be a semi open platform console, where they will be built in games, as well as additional games that can be purchased separately. These are planned to be spiritual successors to the original Neo Geo arcade and home systems.

== N-Gage ==
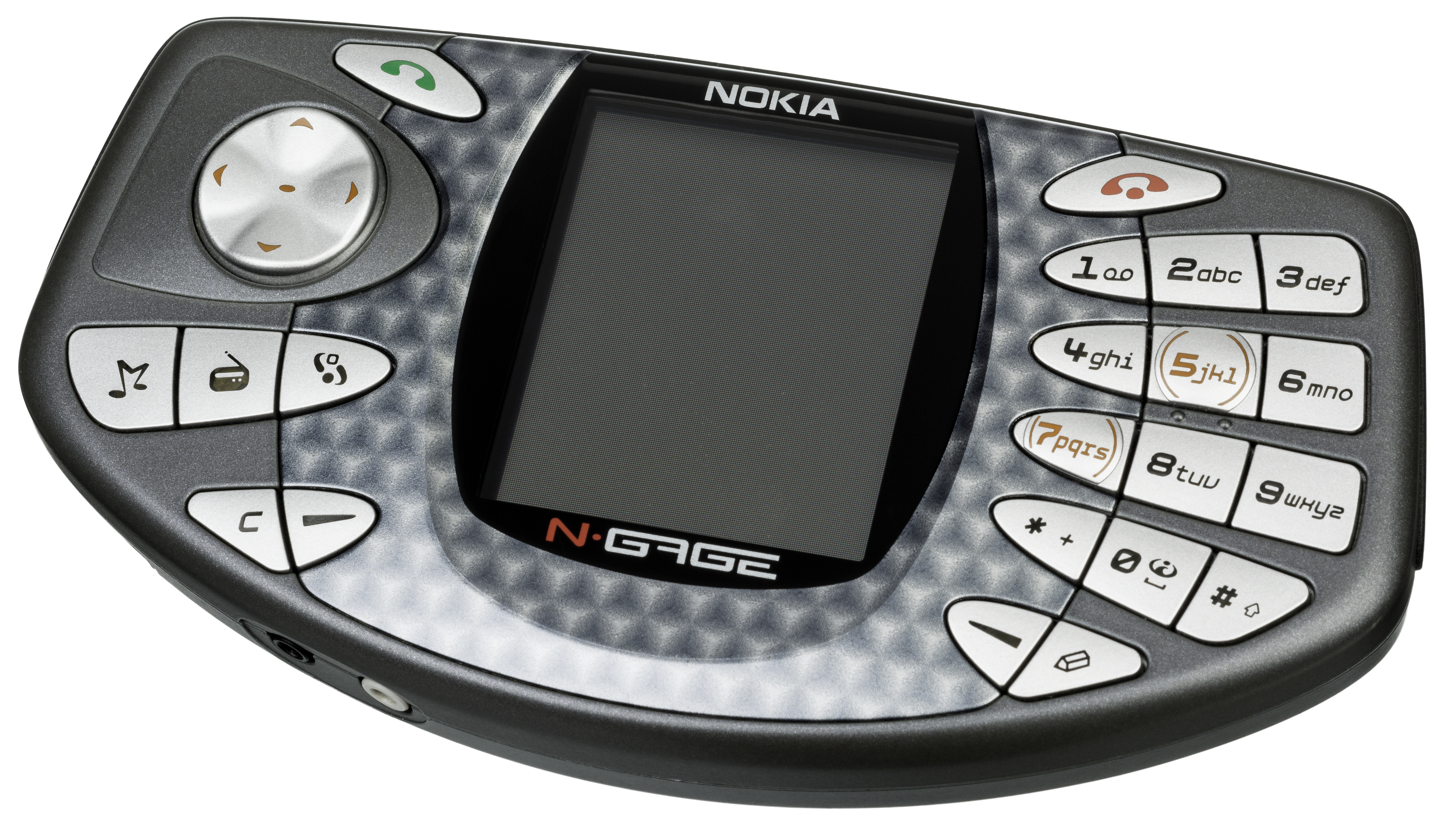
The N-Gage was a smartphone combining features of a mobile phone and a handheld game system.

Made by the Finnish mobile phone manufacturer Nokia, and released in 2003, the N-Gage is a small handheld console, designed to combine a feature-packed mobile/cellular phone with a handheld games console. The system was mocked for its taco-like design, and sales were so poor that the system's price dropped by $100 within a week of its release. Common complaints included the difficulty of swapping games (the cartridge slot was located beneath the battery slot, requiring its removal) and the fact that its cellphone feature required users to hold the device "sideways" (i.e. the long edge of the system) against their cheek. A redesigned version, the N-Gage QD, was released to eliminate these complaints. However, the N-Gage brand still suffered from a poor reputation and the QD did not address the popular complaint that the control layout was "too cluttered". The N-Gage failed to reach the popularity of the Game Boy Advance, Nintendo DS, or the Sony PSP. In November 2005, Nokia announced the failure of its product, in light of poor sales (fewer than three million units sold during the platform's three-year run, against projections of six million). Nokia ceased to consider gaming a corporate priority until 2007, when it expected improved screen sizes and quality to increase demand. However, Nokia's presence in the cell phone market was soon eclipsed by the iPhone and later Android phones, causing development to gravitate to them and sealing the fate of the N-Gage brand. In 2012, Nokia abandoned development on the Symbian OS which was the base for N-Gage and transitioned to Windows Phone.

== Nuon ==
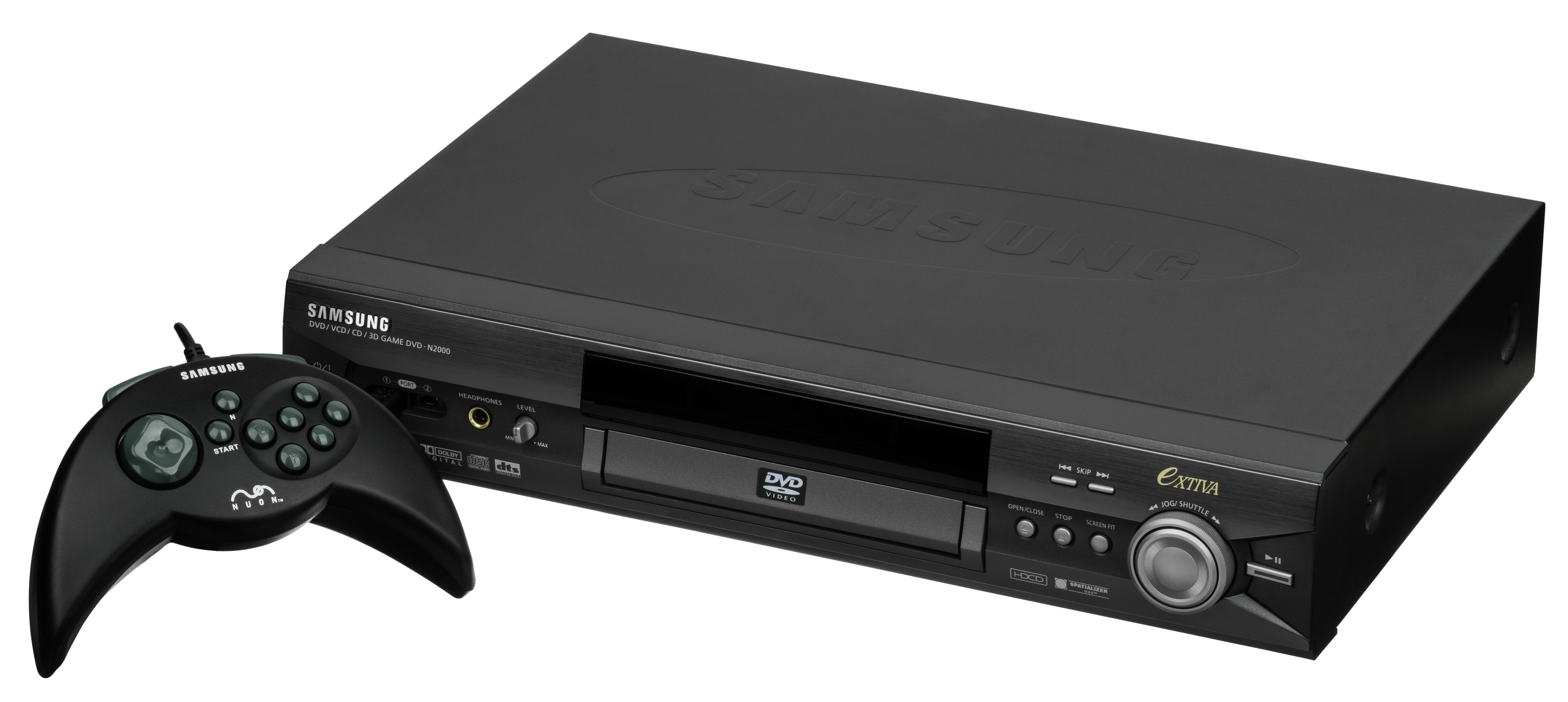
Nuon with Console and Controller

The Nuon is a DVD decoding chip from VM Labs that is also a fully programmable CPU with graphics and sound capabilities. The idea was that a manufacturer could use the chip instead of an existing MPEG-2 decoder, thus turning a DVD player into a game console. A year after launch, only eight games were available. One game, Iron Soldier 3, was recalled for not being compatible with all systems.

== Ouya ==
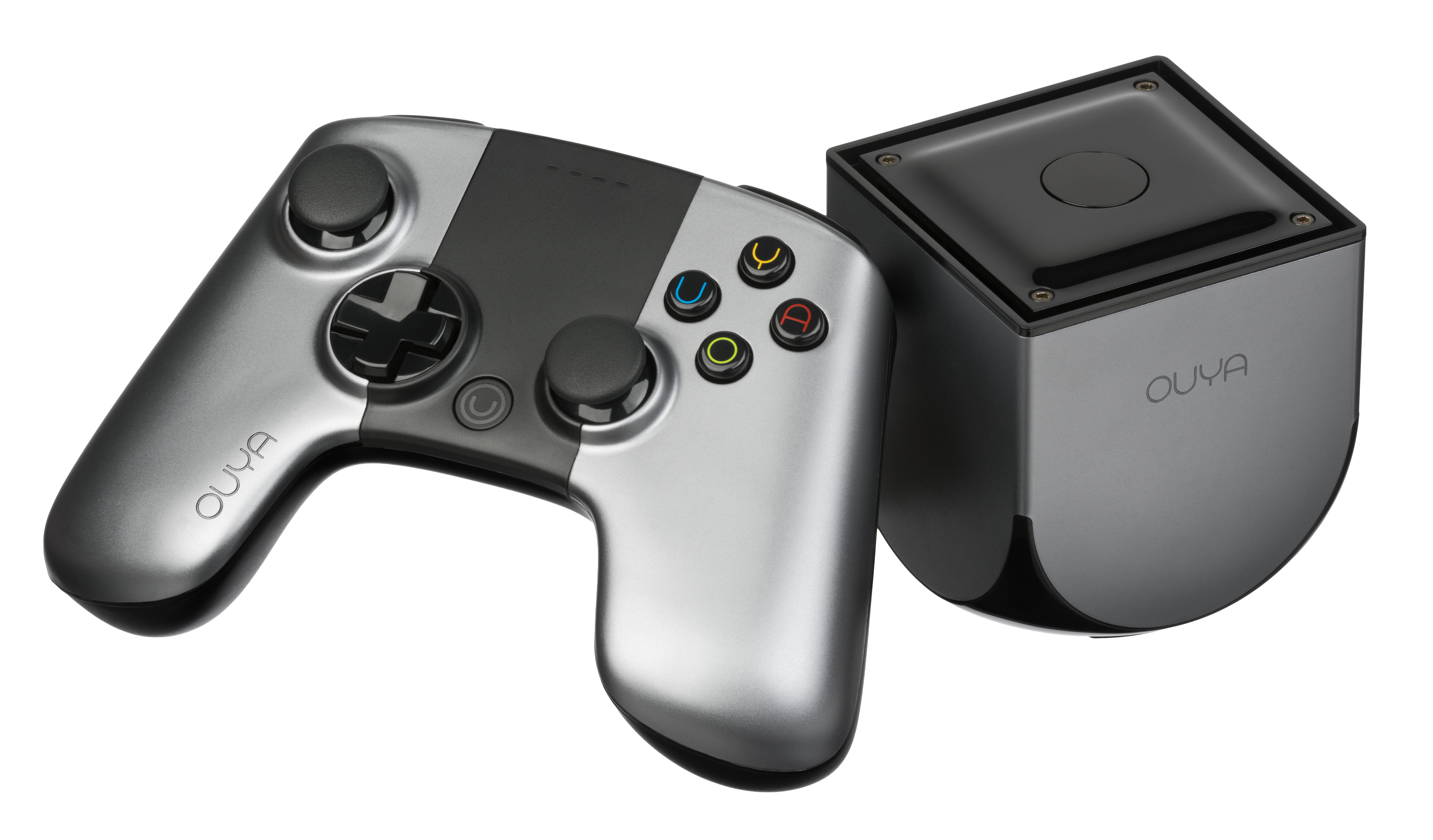
Ouya with Console and Controller

The Ouya is an Android-based microconsole released in 2013 by Ouya, Inc. Even though the Ouya was a success on Kickstarter, the product was plagued by problems from the beginning. The console was very slow to ship and suffered hardware issues. On top of this, the console had a very limited library of games. The critical reception ranged from lukewarm to outright calling the console a scam. Just two years after its release, Ouya was in a dire financial situation and negotiated a buyout with Razer. Razer continued to run software services for Ouya until June 2019, after which the company deactivated all accounts and online services, rendering most apps unusable.

== PC-FX ==
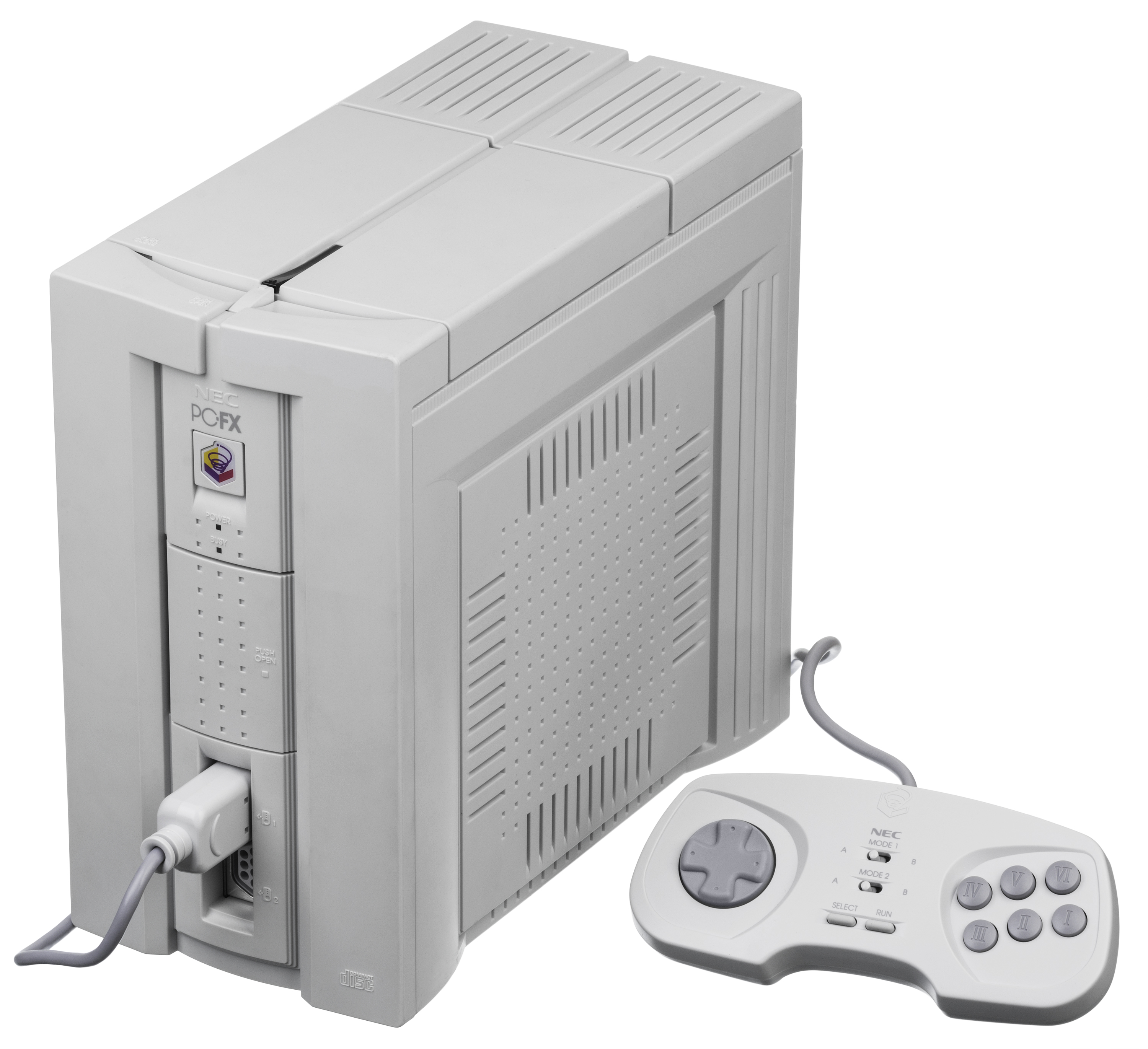
PC-FX with Console and Controller

The PC-FX is the Japan-exclusive successor to the PC Engine (aka TurboGrafx-16), released by NEC in late 1994. Originally intended to compete with the Super Famicom and the Mega Drive, it instead wound up competing with the PlayStation, Sega Saturn, and Nintendo 64. The console's 32-bit architecture was created in 1992, and by 1994 it was outdated, largely due to the fact that it was unable to create 3D images, instead using an architecture that relied on JPEG video. The PC-FX was severely underpowered compared to other fifth generation consoles and had a very low budget marketing campaign, with the system never managing to gain a foothold against its competition or a significant part of the marketshare. The PC-FX was discontinued in early 1998 so that NEC could focus on providing graphics processing units for the upcoming Sega Dreamcast. Around this time, NEC announced that they had only sold 100,000 units with a library of only 62 titles, most of which were dating sims.

== Pippin ==
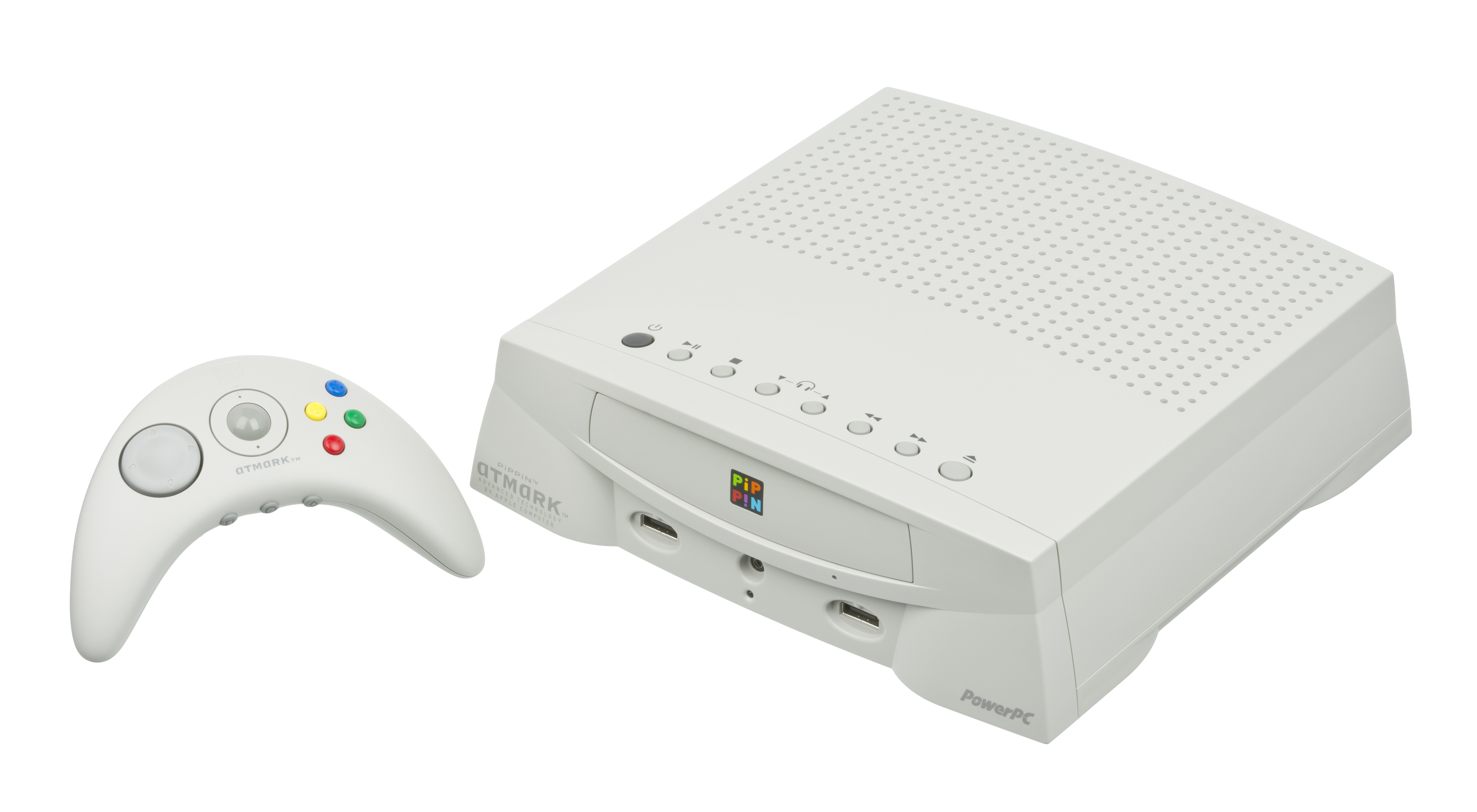
The Bandai Pippin (Atmark Player) and wireless controller

The Pippin is a game console designed by Apple Computer and produced by Bandai (now Bandai Namco) in the mid-1990s based around a PowerPC 603e processor and Classic Mac OS. It featured a 4x CD-ROM drive and a video output that could connect to a standard television monitor. Apple intended to license the technology to third parties; however, only two companies signed on, Bandai and Katz Media, while the only Pippin license to release a product to market was Bandai's. By the time the Bandai Pippin was released (1995 in Japan, 1996 in the United States), the market was already dominated by the Nintendo 64 and PlayStation. The Bandai Pippin also cost US$599 (equivalent to $1,230 in 2025) on launch, more expensive than the competition. Total sales were only around 42,000 units. In 2019, Apple returned to the video game industry with its game subscription service, Apple Arcade, which has proven to be successful.

== PlayStation Classic ==
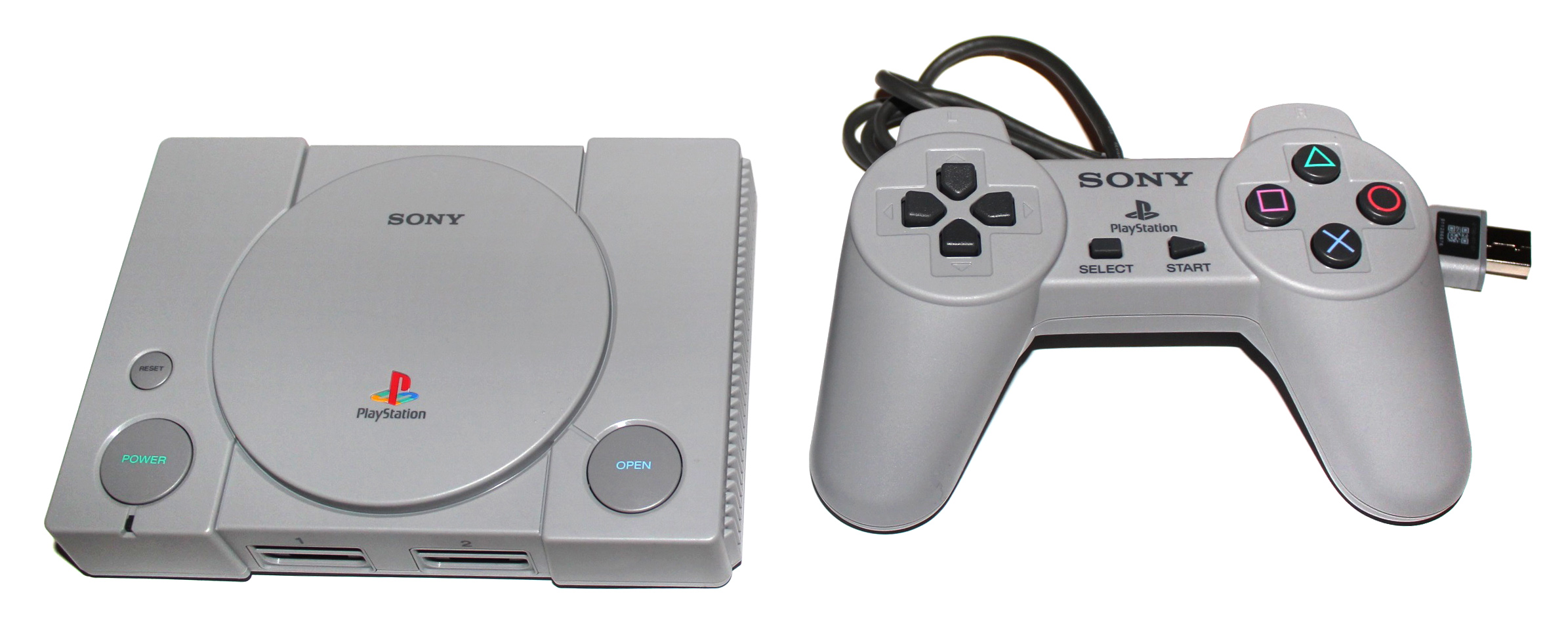
PlayStation Classic and controller

Following the release of Nintendo's NES Classic Edition and SNES Classic Edition, microconsoles that included over 20 preloaded classic games from those respective systems, Sony followed suit with the PlayStation Classic. Like the Nintendo systems, the PlayStation Classic was presented as a smaller form factor of the original PlayStation preloaded with 20 games. It was launched in early December 2018 with a suggested retail price of US$99. The system was heavily criticized at launch. For nine of the games, it used PAL versions (favored primarily in European markets) rather than NTSC (favored primarily in North American and Japanese markets), meaning they ran at a slower 50 Hz clock compared to the 60 Hz, which caused notable frame rate problems and impacted the gameplay style for some of the more highly-interactive titles. The emulation also lacked the feature set that Nintendo had set with its microconsoles. The included game list, while varied by region, also was noted to lack many of the titles that had made the original PlayStation successful, and had a heavy focus on the early games on the console. Some of these absences were attributed to intellectual rights (for example, Activision holding the rights to Crash Bandicoot, Spyro the Dragon, and Tony Hawk's), but other omissions were considered odd and disappointing. The system sold poorly and within the month, its suggested retail price had dropped to US$59. By April 2019, the price had dropped to US$30, and CNET described the PlayStation Classic as "arguably one of the top flops of 2018".

== PlayStation Vita ==
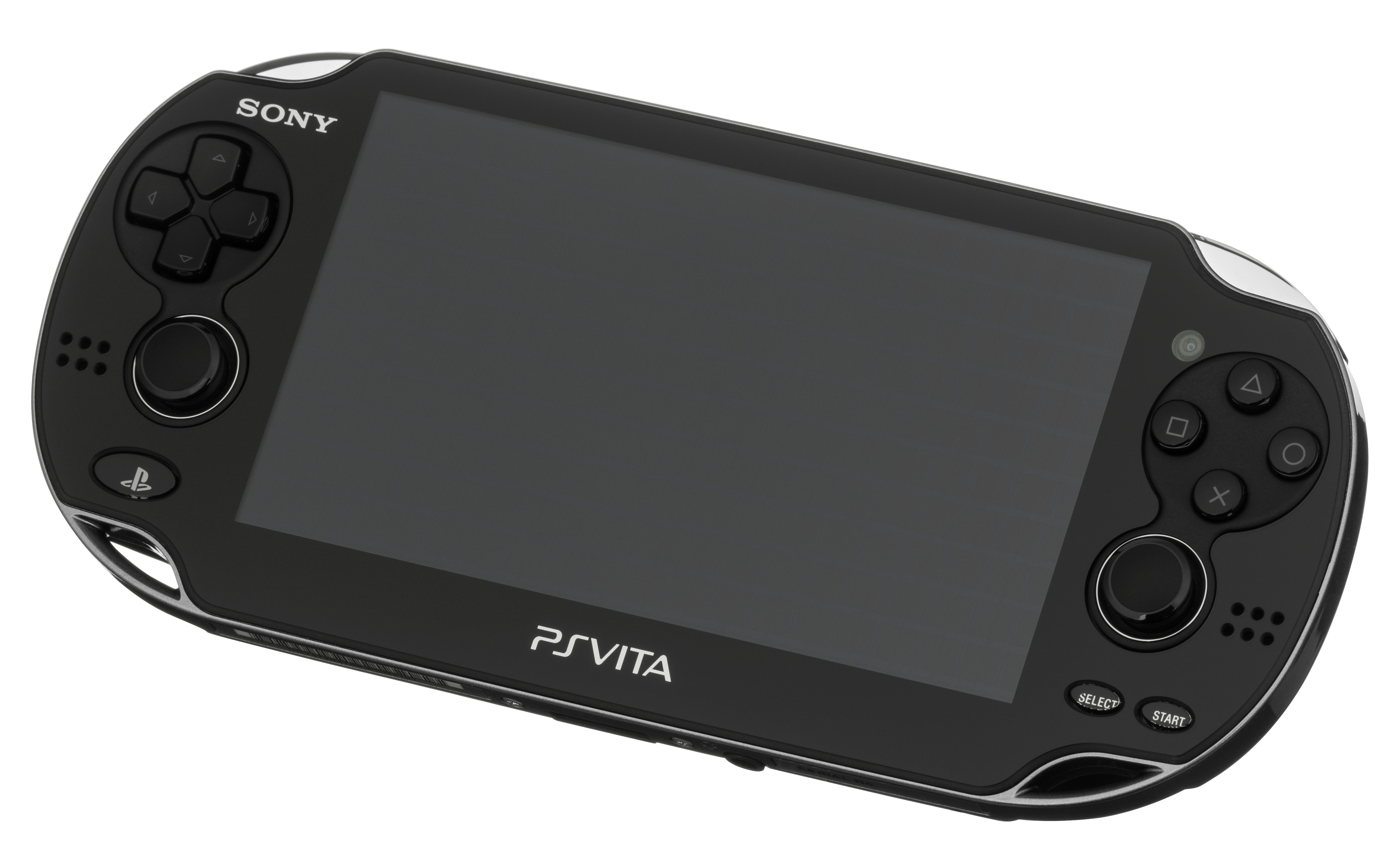
PS Vita

Sony's second major handheld game console, the PlayStation Vita, was released in Japan in 2011 and in the West the following year. The successor to the PlayStation Portable, Sony's intent with the system was to blend the experience of big budget, dedicated video game platforms with the trend of mobile gaming. With a relatively low price, a robust launch title assortment, and a strong debut, analysts predicted the Vita would be a success. However, sales tanked shortly after release; for instance, during Christmas 2011, sales saw a 78% drop in Japan. By 2018, when Sony announced it would end physical game production for the system, the Vita had sold fewer than 15 million units. Hardware production for the Vita ended entirely in March 2019, with no plans for Sony to release a successor. GamesIndustry.biz attributed the Vita's failure to a number of factors, including competition from smartphones and Nintendo's rival 3DS platform, its design being too conceptually similar to the PSP, and a general lack of support from Sony and other developers.

== PSX (DVR) ==
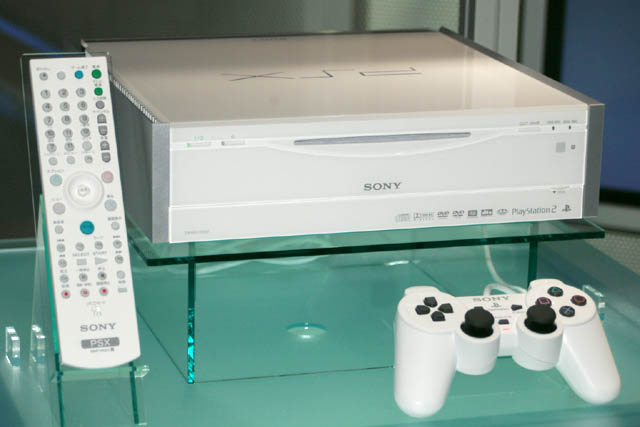
PSX

Built upon the PlayStation 2, the PSX enhanced multimedia derivative was touted to bring convergence to the living room in 2003 by including non-gaming features such as a DVD recorder, TV tuner, and multi-use hard drive. The device was considered a failure upon its Japanese release due to its high price and lack of consumer interest, which resulted in the cancellation of plans to release it in the rest of the world. Not only was it an unsuccessful attempt by Sony Computer Entertainment head Ken Kutaragi to revive the ailing consumer electronics division, it also hurt Sony's media convergence plans.

== Saturn ==
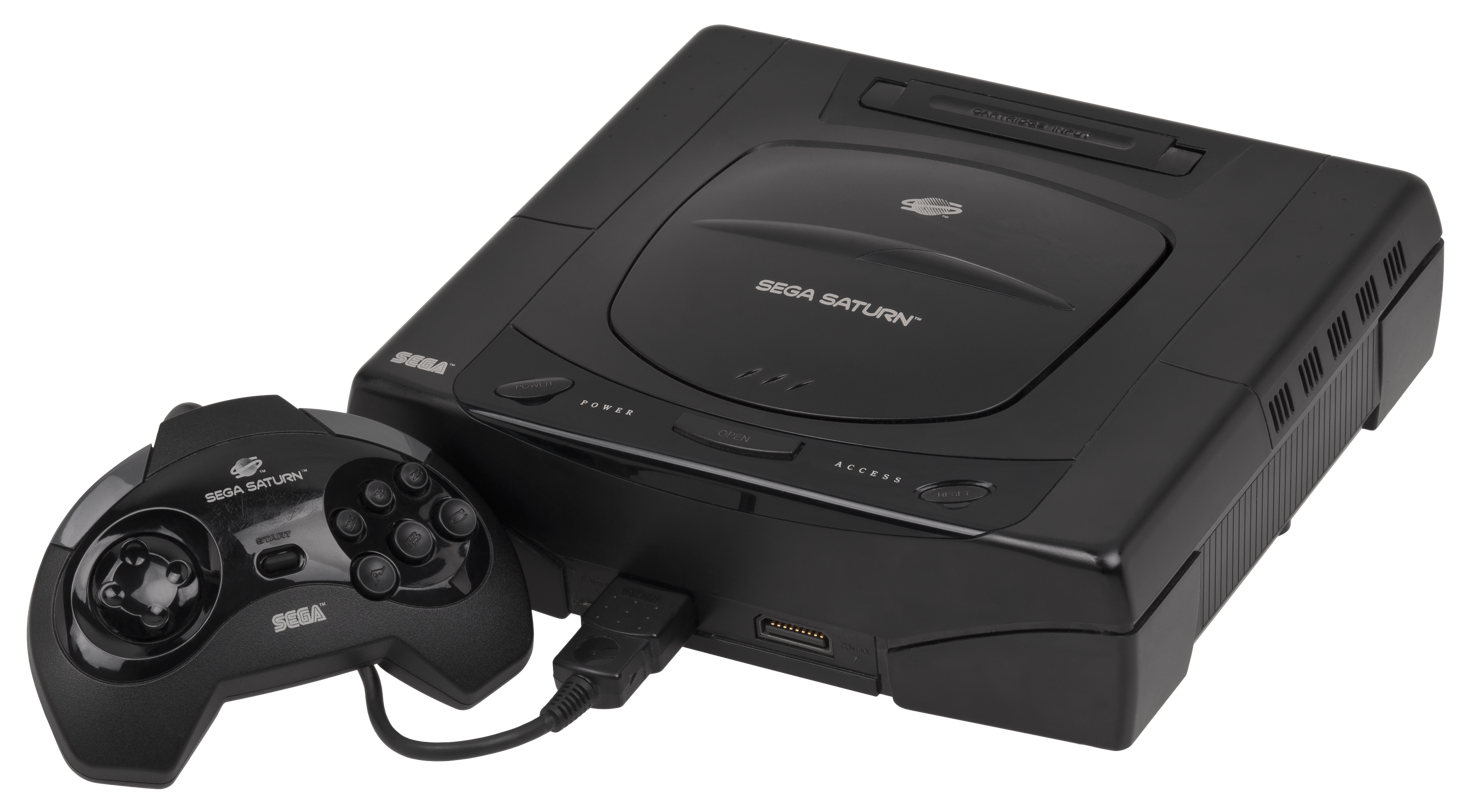
The North American model of the Saturn console

The Sega Saturn was the successor to the Genesis as a 32-bit fifth-generation console, released in Japan in November 1994 and in Western markets mid-1995. The console was designed as a competitor to Sony's PlayStation, released nearly at the same time. With the system selling well in Japan and Sega wanting to get a head start over the PlayStation in North America, the company decided to release the system in May instead of September 1995, which was the same time the PlayStation was going to be released in North America. This left little time to promote the product and limited quantities of the system available at retail. Sega's release strategy also backfired when, shortly after Sega's announcement, Sony announced the price of the PlayStation as being $100 less than the list price for the Saturn. The console also suffered from behind the scenes management conflicts and a lack of coordination between the Japanese and North American branches of the company, leading to the Saturn to be released shortly after the release of the 32X, which created distribution and retail problems. By the end of 1996, the PlayStation had sold 2.9 million units in the U.S., with only 1.2 million units sold by the Saturn. With the added competition from the subsequent release of the Nintendo 64, the Saturn lost market share in North America and was discontinued by 1998. With lifetime sales estimated at 9.26 million units worldwide, the Saturn is considered a commercial failure. The cancellation of a game in the Sonic the Hedgehog series, known in development as Sonic X-treme, has been considered a significant factor in the console's struggle to find an audience. The impact of the failure of the Saturn carried over into Sega's next console, the Dreamcast. However, the console gained interest in Japan and was not officially discontinued until December 7, 2000.

== Stadia ==
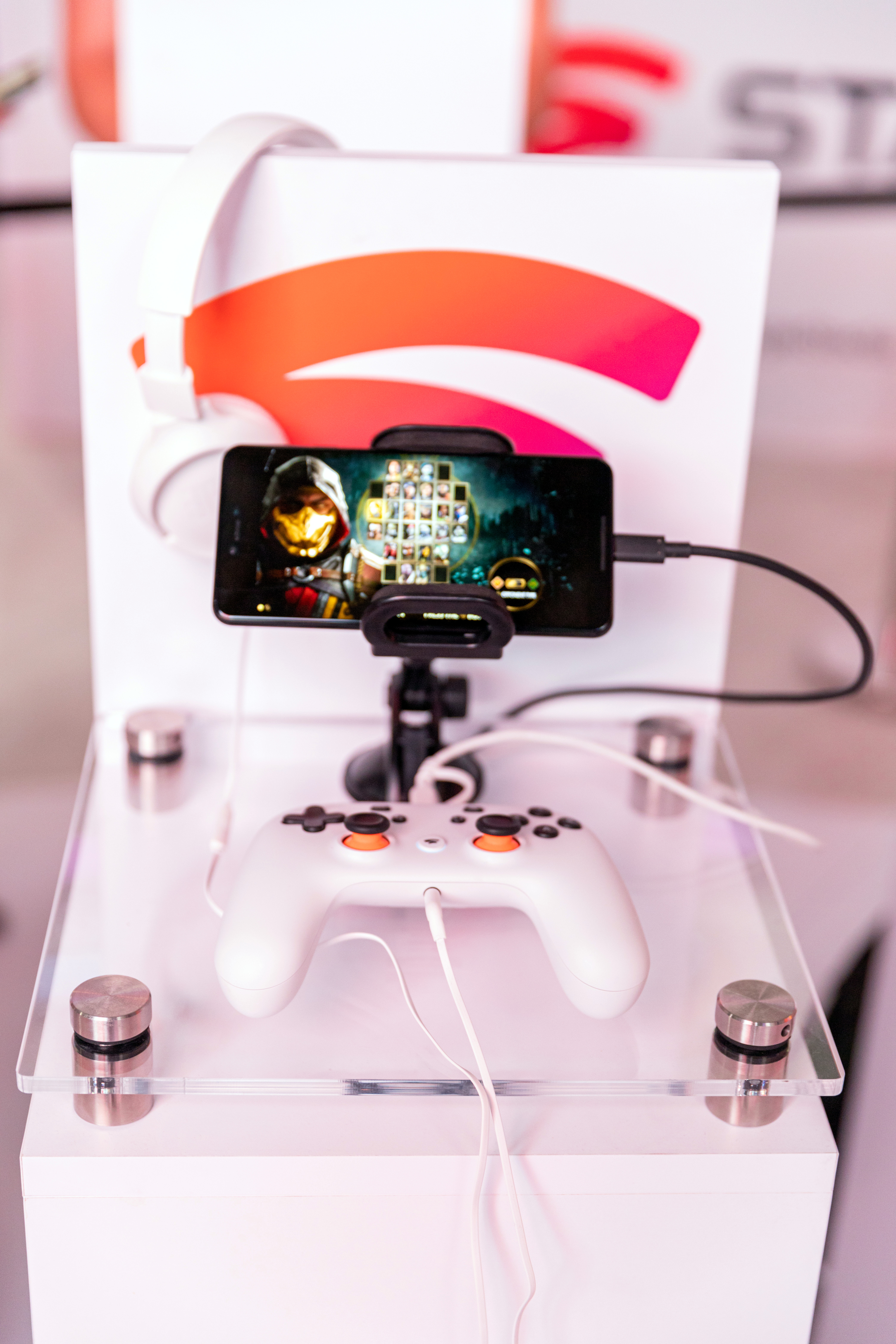
Google Stadia with Controller USB

Google released Stadia, a cloud gaming platform using the power of its existing data centers, in November 2019. Players could access games through web browsers, Chromecast devices, or on mobile platforms. In addition to partnering with several developers to release titles on Stadia, Google created its own Stadia Games and Entertainment division with Jade Raymond as its lead, along with acquiring a handful of existing studios. Unlike prior streaming options where players had access to the full set of titles for a monthly subscription fee, Google opted to have players buy each game they wanted to play, in addition to offering a subscription tier that offered free games. This approach did not obtain significant traction with users, and by February 2021, the company closed down Stadia Games and shuttered the studios it had acquired, stating that it took too much significant investment to develop games, and instead would continue to focus on bringing other titles to the service. After another troubled year, Google stated in February 2022 they would be working to use Stadia's technology as a white-label product for corporate partners, such as delivering game demos over streaming technology. In September 2022, Google announced they were shuttering Stadia as a consumer product, with the service going offline in January 2023 and supplying refunds for those that purchased equipment, subscriptions and games. Google said "it hasn't gained the traction with users that we expected" as the reason for the shutdown, though intended to use the technology in its other business sectors. Game journalists believed that Google did not make Stadia a unique offering with nearly no exclusives, escalated by the shutting down of its studios, and requiring players to repurchase games at full price to play them on the service. Stadia also failed to offer a latency advantage over other streaming services that was promised when announced, and Google had been slow to roll out Stadia internationally, remaining behind GeForce Now and Xbox Cloud Gaming as of February 2022.

== uDraw GameTablet ==
The uDraw GameTablet is a graphics tablet developed by THQ for use on seventh-generation video game consoles, which was initially released for the Wii in late 2010. Versions for the PlayStation 3 and Xbox 360 were released in late 2011. THQ also invested in several games that would uniquely use the tablet, such as uDraw Pictionary. The Wii version had positive sales, with more than 1.7 million units sold, prompting the introduction of the unit for the other console systems. These units did not share the same popularity; 2011 holiday sales in North America fell $100 million below company targets with more than 1.4 million units left unsold by February 2012. THQ commented that if they had not attempted to sell these versions of uDraw, the company would have been profitable that respective quarter, but instead suffered an overall $56 million loss. Because of this failure, THQ was forced to shelve some of its less-successful franchises, such as the Red Faction series. THQ would eventually file for bankruptcy and sell off its assets in early 2013.

== Vectrex ==
Though its independent monitor could display only monochrome visuals, the console's vector-based graphics and arcade-style controller with analog joystick allowed developers to create a strong games library with conversions of arcade hits and critically praised exclusives. However, its release shortly before the video game crash of 1983 has doomed it to an early grave.

== Virtual Boy ==
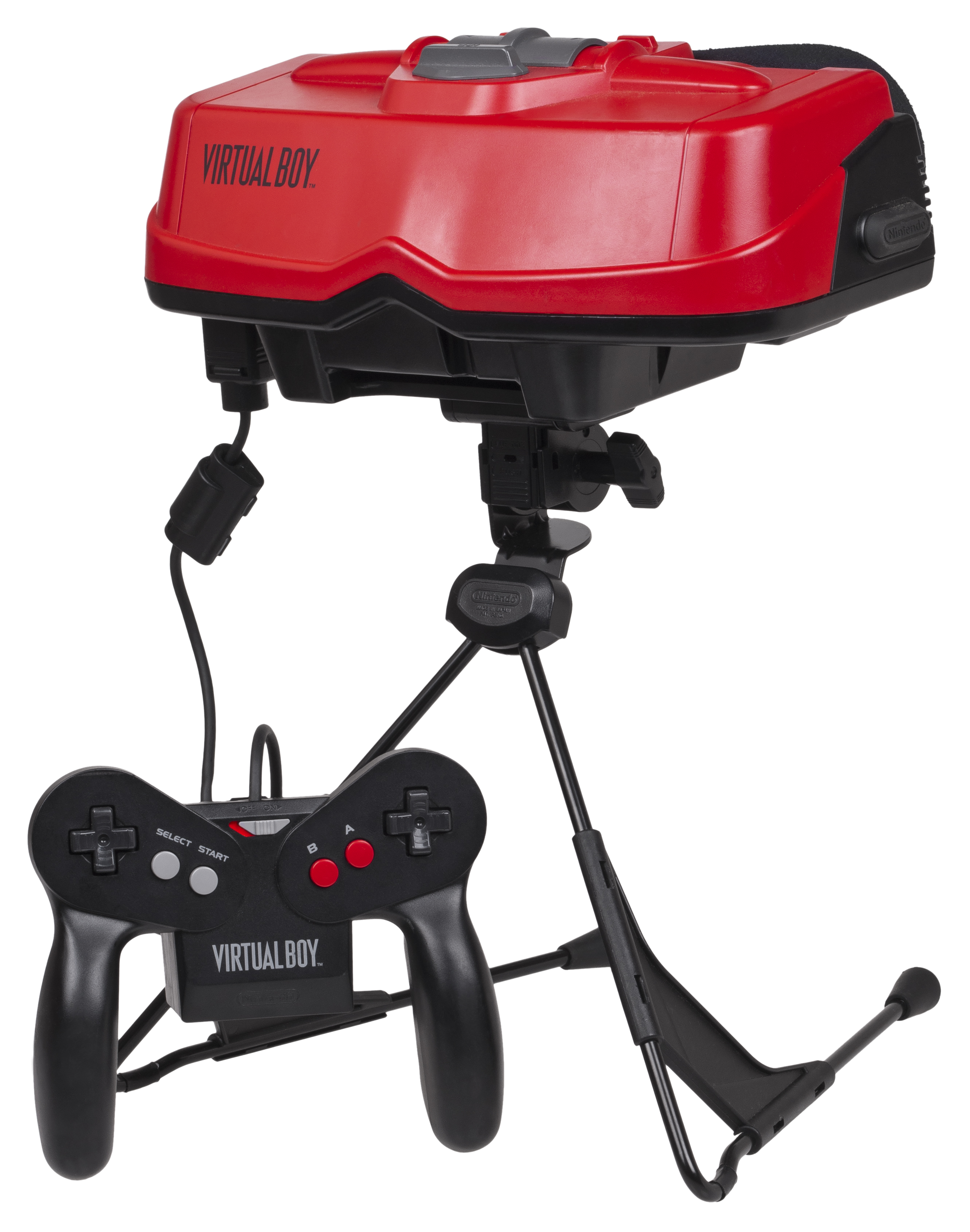
A North American Virtual Boy model.

This red monochromatic 3-D "virtual reality" system was widely panned by critics and failed due to issues related to players getting eye strain, stiff necks, nausea, and headaches when playing it, along with the console's price and lack of portability. It came out in 1995 and was Nintendo's first failed console release. Gunpei Yokoi, the designer of the platform and the person largely credited for the success of the original Game Boy handheld and the Metroid series of games, resigned from the company shortly after the Virtual Boy ceased sales to start his own company, although for reasons unrelated to the console's performance. The Virtual Boy was included in a Time "50 Worst Inventions" list published in May 2010.

== Wii U ==
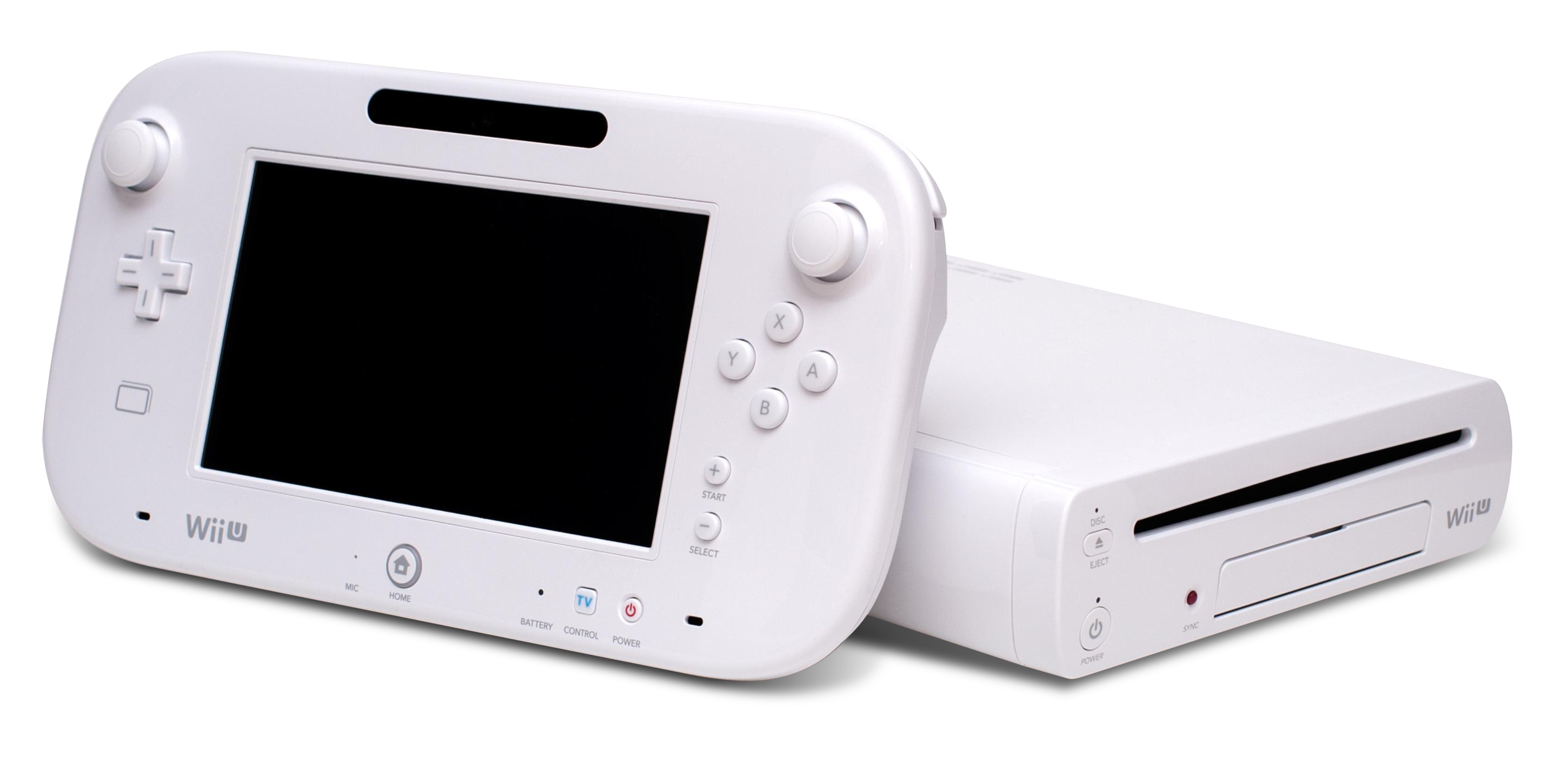
The Wii U with the main console hardware and the GamePad with an embedded touchscreen

Nintendo's Wii U was released in November 2012. It was designed as a successor to the Wii to provide a more sophisticated experience and draw back "core" gamers that had dismissed the Wii, which they found was aimed for casual gameplay. The Wii U features the GamePad, the unit's primary controller with a touchscreen allowing for dual-screen play similar to the Nintendo DS line, or can be used for Off-TV Play. Though the Wii U received positive coverage, it had low sales of fewer than 14 million units by the end of 2016 compared to the Wii's lifetime of 101 million units. Nintendo executives attributed the poor sales of the Wii U to a combination of factors. They admitted their messaging of the Wii U's abilities had not been clear, leading to a general perception that the unit was primarily a tablet system or an add-on to the original Wii rather than a new home console. They also recognized a failure to manage their game release schedule, and to garner significant support from third-party publishers and developers, leaving the Wii U library with gaps in software releases. Nintendo stated an expectation to sell 100 million Wii U units, and this over-estimation of sales contributed to several financial quarters of losses through 2016. Nintendo's next console, the Nintendo Switch, became a "make or break" product for the company due to the Wii U's failure, according to Reggie Fils-Aimé, and its development and marketing avoided several of the pitfalls that occurred for the Wii U; the Switch proved successful quickly, outselling the lifetime sales of the Wii U within nine months of its release. The Wii U was discontinued worldwide on January 31, 2017, a month before the Nintendo Switch was released.
