= Amazon Basics =

Amazon brand label

Example of a product from Amazon Basics.

Amazon Basics is a subdivision and private brand label of the American company Amazon. It primarily acts as an affordable brand for a wide range of commonly sold consumer products, including kitchen supplies, home furnishings, pet products, electronics, fitness and sports products, bed & bath products, storage solutions, garden supplies, home decor, automotive equipment, and child/baby products.

The division was formed in September 2009 with DVD media and video cable offerings initially. The brand claims to offer "highly rated products at low prices" to ease the gap between quality and cost. in 2018, it had roughly 3% of total sales revenue for Amazon.

== Overview ==
In June of 2013, Amazon Basics had 252 products on its website for sale. 4 years later in 2017, it had 1,506 products. Today, Amazon Basics offers a total of 1,874 products on its website.

Amazon Basics offers free returns on their products for a period of time and free same day - 2 day delivery for Amazon Prime members, while non-Prime members may experience slower shipping on some items.

As of June 2020, Amazon Basics was Amazon's largest private brand label.

== Products ==
Amazon Basics sells a variety of products, which all use the Amazon Basics brand label. Products from this brand have a median average price of $57.02.

=== Electronics ===
Picture of an Amazon Basics NiMH rechargeable battery.

Amazon Basics sells a line of consumer electronics, such as their batteries, which account for nearly a third of all e-commerce battery sales in 2018. As of 2026, they are manufactured by FDK and Fusjitsu in factories in China, Indonesia, Vietnam and Malaysia. It also sells USB drives, computer peripherals, computer monitors, speakers, headphones, tablet/e-reader stands, monitor stands, thunderbolt/USB docks, webcams, and microphones.

=== Kitchen products ===
Amazon Basics sells cookware, bakeware, appliances, such as waffle makers and coffee makers, electric skillets and plates.

=== Home products ===
Amazon Basics sells a collection of home products, including disinfecting wipes, detergent, dish/hand soap, plastic utensils, paper plates, towels, paper towels, toilet paper, plastic bags, tissues, aluminum/plastic wraps and parchment paper.

=== Outdoor ===
The brand sells outdoor products that include common furnishings found in an outdoor setting, with mostly outdoor couches/chairs sold, as well as fire pits. they also sell adjustable chairs and gardening tools, such as water cans, tents, and sleeping bags. ceramic plant pots, hammocks, and large umbrella bases are also offered.

=== Pet ===
Amazon Basics sells products for both dogs and cats, including urination floor pads, waste bags, dog/cat food, cages, litter boxes, and indoor cat homes.

=== Automotive ===
Amazon Basics primarily sells cleaning/protection products for cars in this product line, including microfiber cloths and sponges for exterior washing, car brushes, squeegees, car covers, and rubber floor mats.

=== Office supplies ===
Amazon Basics brand stapler, an example of their office supplies offerings.

Amazon Basics has variety of products for office/school use, including permanent markers, calculators, pens, notebooks, shredders, highlighters, whiteboards and whiteboard/dry erase markers, file organizers, office chairs, envelopes, laminating material, masking tape, clipboards, hole punchers, and desks.

=== Other products ===
Amazon Basics sells fitness and sports products, storage bins/solutions, bed/bath products, business supplies, travel products, and child/baby offerings.

== Reception ==
=== General reception ===
Amazon Basics reception is generally positive, with customers noting Amazon Basic's reliability and quality on simple items, with their batteries receiving high praise for their quality and affordability. Average ratings for the brand is 4.5 stars, with many customers finding little difference between established, name brands and Amazon Basics.

=== Criticism and investigations ===
Amazon Basics has received criticism for the reliability of more complex electronics, like their coffee or microwave offerings, which have been proven unreliable under 2021 investigations questioning reliability. Investigators noted that some products, specifically electronics outside of batteries, have melted, caught fire, or even exploded.
