= White-label product =

Product sold and claimed by a company that did not produce it

A white-label product is a product or service produced by one company (the producer) that other companies (the marketers) rebrand to make it appear as if they had made it. The name derives from the image of a white label on the packaging that can be filled in with the marketer's trade dress. White-label products are sold by retailers with their own trademark but the products themselves are manufactured by a third party.

== Common use ==
White label production is often used for mass-produced generic products including electronics, consumer products and software packages such as DVD players, televisions, and web applications. Some companies maintain a sub-brand for their goods. For example, in the United Kingdom, the same model of DVD player may be sold by Dixons as a Saisho and by Currys as a Matsui, which are brands exclusively used by those companies.

Most supermarket store brand products are provided by companies that sell to multiple supermarkets, changing only the labels. In addition, some manufacturers create low-cost generic brand labels with only the name of the product ("Beer", "Cola", etc.). Richelieu Foods, for example, is a private label food manufacturing company producing frozen pizza, salad dressing, sauces, marinades, condiments, and deli salads for other companies, including Hy-Vee, Aldi, Save A Lot, Sam's Club, Hannaford, BJ's Wholesale Club (Earth's Pride brand), and Shaw's Supermarkets (Culinary Circle brand). Amazon offers consumer goods produced by third parties but sold under the Amazon Basics brand.

Smaller banks sometimes outsource their credit card or check processing operations to larger banks, which issue and process the credit cards as white-label cards, typically for a fee, allowing the smaller bank to brand the cards as their own without having to invest in the necessary infrastructure. For example, Cuscal Limited provides white-label card and transactional products to credit unions in Australia; Simple issued bank accounts and debit cards operated by The Bancorp Bank and BBVA Compass in the United States.

Many software companies offer white-label software to agencies or other customers, including the possibility to resell the software under the customer's brand. This typically requires functionalities such as the adaptation of the software's visual appearance, multi-customer management and automatic billing to the end-customers based on usage parameters.

== See also ==
- Private label
- Rebadging
- White box (computer hardware)
- White label record
