= FDK Corporation =

Japanese electronics manufacturer

- Native name: FDK株式会社
- Romanized name: FDK Kabushiki-gaisha
- Formerly: Tokyo Electro-chemical Industry Co., Ltd. (1950-1958); Fuji Electrochemical Co., Ltd.
- Type: Public (K.K)
- Traded as: TYO: 6955
- Founded: February 7, 1950; 76 years ago
- Headquarters: Konan, Minato, Tokyo, Japan
- Owner: PSA Group (Taiwan) (45%)
- Website: https://www.fdk.co.jp/

FDK Corporation (FDK株式会社, FDK Kabushiki-gaisha) is a Japanese manufacturer of electronic components, batteries, and similar products. While the company is publicly traded, 45% of its shares are owned by PSA Group (Taiwan) and 18% are owned by Fujitsu.

== Overview ==
FDK Corporation is a consolidated subsidiary of Fujitsu, named for the former company name Fuji Denki Kagaku. In the past, products were sold under the FUJI NOVEL brand, but now they are manufactured and sold under the FDK and Fujitsu brands.

As a result of Panasonic's acquisition of Sanyo Electric, FDK acquired shares in Sanyo Energy Twicell (which inherited Sanyo's nickel-metal hydride battery business other than for automotive use and separated businesses other than nickel-metal hydride batteries) and Sanyo Energy Tottori (which inherited Sanyo's cylindrical lithium primary batteries and coin-type secondary batteries). On the day of the acquisition, the company names were changed to FDK Twicell Co., Ltd. and FDK Tottori Co., Ltd., respectively.

FDK Twicell Co., Ltd. was later absorbed by FDK in December 2014, and FDK Tottori in October 2016.

Some of the equipment at the Washizu Plant and the Takasaki Plant (formerly FDK Twicell) were originally Toshiba Battery facilities (see each article and the history below).
