= Llamasoft: The Jeff Minter Story =

- Developer: Digital Eclipse
- Publisher: Digital Eclipse
- Series: Gold Master
- Platforms: Nintendo Switch; PlayStation 4; PlayStation 5; Windows; Xbox One; Xbox Series X/S
- Release: March 13, 2024
- Modes: Single-player, multiplayer

Llamasoft: The Jeff Minter Story is an interactive documentary and compilation video game developed by Digital Eclipse. The release chronicles the software of British developer Jeff Minter and over 40 of his programs developed between 1981 and 1994. It is the second release in Digital Eclipse's Gold Master Series that began with The Making of Karateka (2023) and was succeeded by Tetris Forever (2024).

Like Digital Eclipse's Atari 50 (2022) and The Making of Karateka, Llamasoft: The Jeff Minter Story features an interactive timeline that allows users to play games as well as view text, documentary footage, and photography involving the games. Some games, such as 3D 3D, have updated control schemes and can be played in their original form or with enhancements such as modern control schemes and updated frame rates.

It was released on the March 13, 2024 for the Nintendo Switch, PlayStation 4, PlayStation 5, Windows, Xbox One, and Xbox Series X/S. General reception towards the game was positive, with critics praising it for a high quality and standard for a retro game compilation while criticizing its lack of games made after Tempest 2000 (1994).

== Content ==
Llamasoft: The Jeff Minter Story highlights Minter's first fifteen years of game development, ranging across platforms that were primarily popular in Europe. It goes through 42 games from 1981 to 1994 across eight different video game platforms. Among the games are two of Minter's "light synthesizer" programs: Psychedelia and Colourspace. Digital Eclipse adjusted several games to be playing on contemporary control pads. Some games such as 3D 3D are playable in their original form, as well as being updated to have boosted frame rate and contemporary First-person shooter-based controls. The most recent game on the list is Tempest 2000 (1994), with Digital Eclipse's editorial director Chris Kohler saying that the Atari Jaguar was the extent of what they could emulate, as material for systems like the Nuon was "a bridge too far". The game also includes a list of every Llamasoft title released, including titles not available on the collection.

The games are displayed in four interactive timelines which offer the games in along with video interviews, photos, and text quotes about the games. Minter included much of his own collection of Llamasoft-related material in the release, going through his own catalogue of British video game magazines as well as reaching out to others to find material not in his own archive. Video footage in the features Minter, industry peers, YouTubers, journalists such as Gary Penn of Zzap!64, Gary Whitta, Harold Goldberg and Bex Trista.

== Development ==
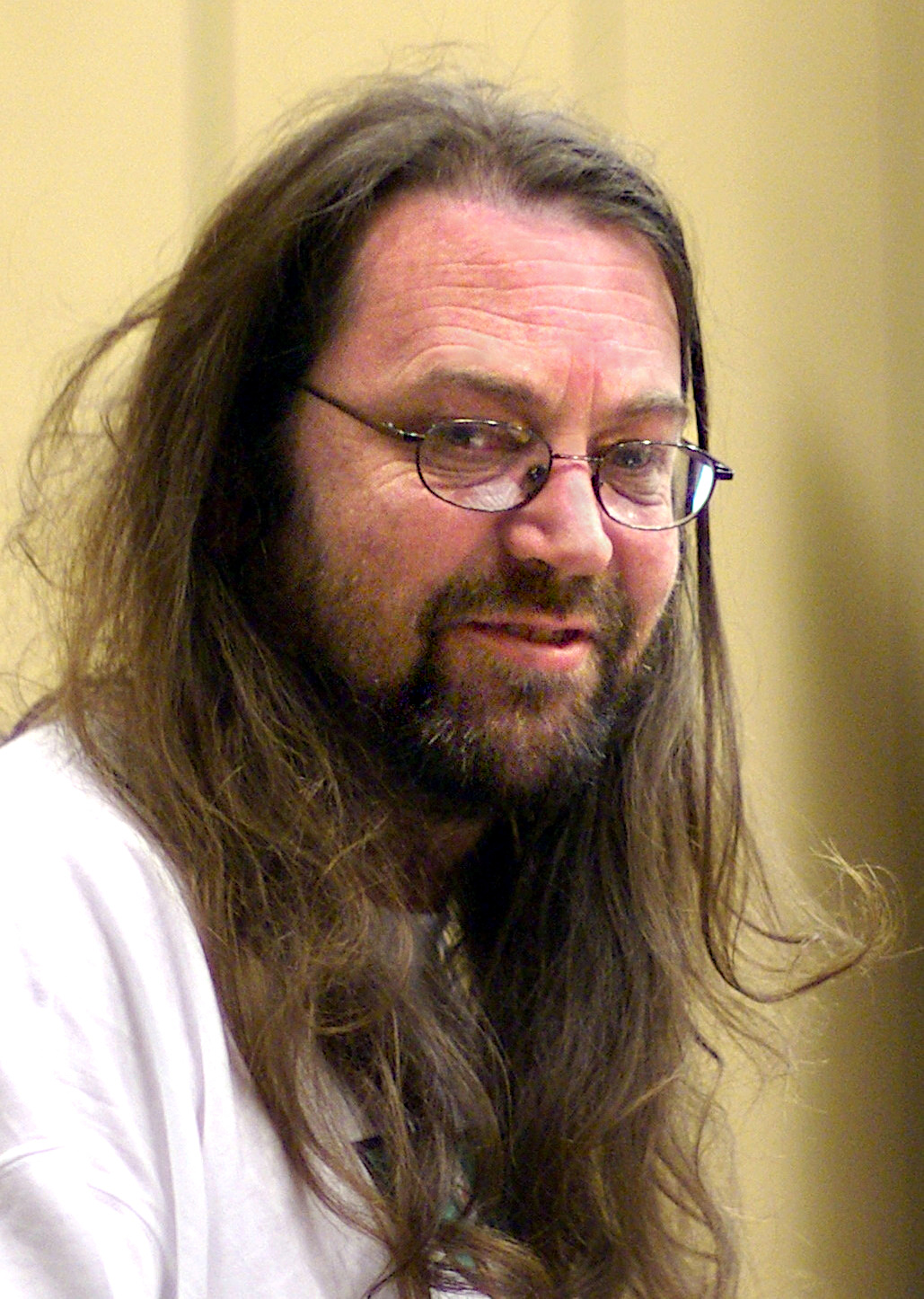
Llamasoft: The Jeff Minter Story compiles the early games developed by Jeff Minter (pictured in 2007).

In 2023, Digital Eclipse announced they would adapt the interactive documentary and historical timeline format used in their Atari 50 (2022) into further products under their Gold Master Series branding. Kohler stated that the audience immediately picked up the idea of going through a timeline within Atari 50 and following the history, which gave the team at Digital Eclipse the confidence to continue with the format. The first Gold Master Series release was The Making of Karateka (2023), which chronicled the history of Karateka (1984). Around the period final stages of development on Atari 50, Digital Eclipse signed on with Jeff Minter for a title documenting his studio Llamasoft. Unlike Jordan Mechner with The Making of Karateka, Minter did not have as many of his older design documents, leading to Digital Eclipse to focus more on showcasing his games first.

Digital Eclipse announced on Double Fine's Day of the Devs livestream in December 2023 that the next release in the series would be titled Llamasoft: The Jeff Minter Story focusing on the career of video game designer Jeff Minter. Digital Eclipse's studio head Mike Mika described Minter as "the last indie developer", and that he was the last generation of bedroom coders that founded the British computer game industry. While most developers started in this way and went on to form large companies, Minter continued to develop games on his own. Mika also stated that before entering the game industry, Minter had reached out and helped him get started.

New work was done to create emulators of computers such as the VIC-20, ZX Spectrum, and ZX81. To emulate the Atari ST games, work was done to port these games to the Jaguar as they both share hardware. These ports of the games are originally fan works. Kohler said that without the fanbase for these games archiving and creating fan ports, these games Llamasoft would not be able to keep working as it was just a two-person operation. The Konix Multisystem, a British console that never released was emulated based on technical specifications of the system and Minter's source code for Attack of the Mutant Camels '89.

Unlike previous projects, Digital Eclipse partnered with filmmaker Paul Docherty who was developing a documentary titled Heart of Neon about Minter. Kohler and Docherty collaborated on collecting footage to apply into this release. Minter commented on one item to be changed during development, involving a stock image of tea, which depicted a milk-free cup with the bag left in, which prompted Kohler to correct this with a newly made image per Minter's specifications "you would never even need to know that I used PG Tips to make the tea in that shot, but I guarantee you that's what's in there." Other games, such as the political commentary in Bomb Buenos Aires are addressed and released in a form described as "less controversial" by Retro Gamer.

== Games ==
There are 42 games available in the collection.

Games in the collection
Title	ZX81	VIC-20	C64	ZX Spectrum	Atari 8-bit	Konix Multi-System	Atari ST	Jaguar	Other	Note
3D 3D	Yes	—N/a	—N/a	—N/a	—N/a	—N/a	—N/a	—N/a	—N/a	
Centipede	Yes	—N/a	—N/a	—N/a	—N/a	—N/a	—N/a	—N/a	—N/a	
Abductor	—N/a	Yes	—N/a	—N/a	—N/a	—N/a	—N/a	—N/a	—N/a	
Andes Attack	—N/a	Yes	—N/a	—N/a	—N/a	—N/a	—N/a	—N/a	—N/a	
Deflex V	—N/a	Yes	—N/a	—N/a	—N/a	—N/a	—N/a	—N/a	—N/a	
Gridrunner	—N/a	Yes	Yes	—N/a	Yes	—N/a	—N/a	—N/a	—N/a	
Hellgate	—N/a	Yes	Yes	—N/a	—N/a	—N/a	—N/a	—N/a	—N/a	
Laser Zone	—N/a	Yes	Yes	—N/a	—N/a	—N/a	—N/a	—N/a	—N/a	
Matrix: Gridrunner 2	—N/a	Yes	Yes	—N/a	—N/a	—N/a	—N/a	—N/a	—N/a	
Metagalactic Llamas Battle at the Edge of Time	—N/a	Yes	Yes	—N/a	—N/a	—N/a	—N/a	—N/a	—N/a	
Ratman	—N/a	Yes	—N/a	—N/a	—N/a	—N/a	—N/a	—N/a	—N/a	
Ancipital	—N/a	—N/a	Yes	—N/a	—N/a	—N/a	—N/a	—N/a	—N/a	
Attack of the Mutant Camels	—N/a	—N/a	Yes	—N/a	Yes	—N/a	—N/a	—N/a	—N/a	
Batalyx	—N/a	—N/a	Yes	—N/a	—N/a	—N/a	—N/a	—N/a	—N/a	
Hover Bovver	—N/a	—N/a	Yes	—N/a	Yes	—N/a	—N/a	—N/a	—N/a	
Iridis Alpha	—N/a	—N/a	Yes	—N/a	—N/a	—N/a	—N/a	—N/a	—N/a	
Mama Llama	—N/a	—N/a	Yes	—N/a	—N/a	—N/a	—N/a	—N/a	—N/a	
Psychedelia	—N/a	—N/a	Yes	—N/a	—N/a	—N/a	—N/a	—N/a	—N/a	
Revenge of the Mutant Camels	—N/a	—N/a	Yes	—N/a	—N/a	—N/a	Yes	—N/a	—N/a	
Revenge of the Mutant Camels II	—N/a	—N/a	Yes	—N/a	—N/a	—N/a	—N/a	—N/a	—N/a	
Rox 64	—N/a	—N/a	Yes	—N/a	—N/a	—N/a	—N/a	—N/a	—N/a	
Sheep in Space	—N/a	—N/a	Yes	—N/a	—N/a	—N/a	—N/a	—N/a	—N/a	
Voidrunner	—N/a	—N/a	Yes	—N/a	—N/a	—N/a	—N/a	—N/a	—N/a	
City Bomb	—N/a	—N/a	—N/a	Yes	—N/a	—N/a	—N/a	—N/a	—N/a	
Headbangers Heaven	—N/a	—N/a	—N/a	Yes	—N/a	—N/a	—N/a	—N/a	—N/a	
Rox III	—N/a	—N/a	—N/a	Yes	—N/a	—N/a	—N/a	—N/a	—N/a	
Superdeflex	—N/a	—N/a	—N/a	Yes	—N/a	—N/a	—N/a	—N/a	—N/a	
Colourspace	—N/a	—N/a	—N/a	—N/a	Yes	—N/a	—N/a	—N/a	—N/a	
Turboflex	—N/a	—N/a	—N/a	—N/a	Yes	—N/a	—N/a	—N/a	—N/a	
Attack of the Mutant Camels '89	—N/a	—N/a	—N/a	—N/a	—N/a	Yes	—N/a	—N/a	—N/a	Unreleased demo
Llamatron: 2112	—N/a	—N/a	—N/a	—N/a	—N/a	—N/a	Yes	—N/a	—N/a	
Super Gridrunner	—N/a	—N/a	—N/a	—N/a	—N/a	—N/a	Yes	—N/a	—N/a	
Tempest 2000	—N/a	—N/a	—N/a	—N/a	—N/a	—N/a	—N/a	Yes	—N/a	
Gridrunner Remastered	—N/a	—N/a	—N/a	—N/a	—N/a	—N/a	—N/a	—N/a	Yes	Updated graphical version of Gridrunner

== Release and reception ==
Reception

Aggregate scores
Aggregator	Score
Metacritic	(NS) 85/100 (PS5) 83/100 (XSXS) 83/100 (PC) 72/100
OpenCritic	91% recommend

Review scores
Publication	Score
Destructoid	7/10
Eurogamer	4/5
Nintendo Life	9/10
Push Square	9/10
Retro Gamer	93%
Shacknews	4/10
The Games Machine (Italy)	8/10

Llamasoft: The Jeff Minter Story was published by Digital Eclipse on March 13, 2024, for the Nintendo Switch, PlayStation 4, PlayStation 5, Windows, Xbox One, and Xbox Series X/S. Physical copies are set to be available from Limited Run Games. On the eve of the game's release, Minter said "I hope people don't rush through [the compilation] too much [...] I hope it doesn't suffer too much from what I call 'emulator syndrome,' where you install an emulator on a machine, then you put a bunch of ROMs [digital copies of games] on there, and then you have five minutes on this, five minutes on that, five minutes on that. You don't really get the full flavor of any of them." It received "generally favorable" reviews, according to review aggregator Metacritic, and 91% of critics recommended the game according to OpenCritic.

Critics such as Christian Donlan of Eurogamer, Ken Talbot of Push Square, and Garrett Martin of Paste praised it as a high standard for retro game compilations. Donlan specifically highlighted the presentation of the timeline for its presentation, control guides, additional information and quick load times. Martin compared the release to other compilations, noting that "ever since companies first realized they could make some money by bundling their old games together and tossing them back out to the public with minimal care or effort", and that, along with Atari 50 and The Making of Karateka, Llamasoft: The Jeff Minter Story "showed how utterly insufficient that kind of collection is" and that "proof that, yes, games can be art.".

These reviewers also complimented Minter's personality and games. Martin commented that the games show Minter's growth as an artist through the advancement of computer technology and that Minter's visuals and dreamlike logic were a unified body of work. Donlan found that "Minter is so incredibly different... all different in some fundamental way, all fizzing with colour and energy and a very British sense of absurd humour". Lewis Packwood of Rock Paper Shotgun found that even some missteps such as Mama Llama were interesting in context of Minter's career. Ollie Reynolds of Nintendo Life found the package was not as broad as Atari 50 or as focused as The Making of Karateka, but still strong as "Jeff Minter's is a much more intimate story". Reynolds stated that "not every game included here is great, and some, like 1982's Ratman, are particularly egregious even by Minter’s own admission. And sure, if you go into this collection and just dive straight into the list of playable games without experiencing the crucial context that the timeline itself provides, then you might struggle to find the fun. But learning the background behind each title included allows you to appreciate the thought and intent behind each game." Reviewers also complimented on the non-games added, such as the light synthesizers such as Colourspace.

General criticism included the lack of later games. Reynolds specifically lamented the lack of Defender 2000 (1996) for the Atari Jaguar. Zoey Handley of Destructoid stated that while the release "contains a lot of fascinating material and great games, it's not a very good read", noting that a lot of the engaging material was Minter's long writing and documentation which affected the pacing of the product and that the interviewed individuals generally do not have a lot of insight. Jeff Broadwell of Shacknews gave a generally negative review of the game, finding it "baffling, incomplete, and rushed" and stating that the historical aspects were vague, that Minter's career was a loose timeline of events without only a handful of informative asides. He felt it required better editing and curation, and found the handwritten notes being transcribed made it difficult to get any information from them.

Llamasoft: The Jeff Minter Story was nominated for a 2025 British Academy Games Award for Game Beyond Entertainment, an award for video games which "raise awareness through empathy and emotional impact, to engage with real world problems, or to make the world a better place."

== Sources ==
=== References ===
- Besser, Paolo (March 13, 2024). "Llamasoft: The Jeff Minter Story - Recensione". The Games Machine (in Italian). Archived from the original on March 13, 2024.
- Broadwell, Josh (March 12, 2024). "Llamasoft: The Jeff Minter Story Review: A Little Better Than Wikipedia". Shacknews. Archived from the original on March 13, 2024.
- Donlan, Christian (March 13, 2024). "Llamasoft: The Jeff Minter Story Review - Classic Games, Now with Fascinating Context". Eurogamer. Archived from the original on March 13, 2024.
- Handley, Zoey (December 6, 2023). "Digital Eclipse's Next Gold Master game is Llamasoft: The Jeff Minter Story". Destructoid. Archived from the original on January 19, 2024.
- Handley, Zoey (March 13, 2024). "Review: Llamasoft: The Jeff Minter Story". Destructoid. Archived from the original on March 13, 2024.
- "Llamasoft: The Jeff Minter Story". Digital Eclipse. Atari SA.
- "Llamasoft: The Jeff Minter Story". Metacritic. Fandom, Inc..
- "Llamasoft: The Jeff Minter Story". OpenCritic. April 2024.
- DeSena, Gabby (December 11, 2024). "The 2025 BAFTA Games Awards: All Nominations". ESports Illustrated. Archived from the original on December 16, 2024.
- Machkovech, Sam (March 12, 2024). "How the Iconic Jeff Minter Stays Inspired After 43 Llama-filled Years of Game Development". Game Developer. Archived from the original on March 13, 2024.
- Martin, Garrett (March 12, 2024). "Llamasoft: The Jeff Minter Story Digs Into the Underground Past (and Future) of Games". Paste. Archived from the original on March 13, 2024.
- Packwood, Lewis (March 13, 2024). "Why Did Digital Eclipse Make Llamasoft: The Jeff Minter Story? It's a Tale of Centipedes, Psychedelia, and Tea". Rock Paper Shotgun. Archived from the original on March 13, 2024.
- Reynolds, Ollie (March 13, 2024). "Llamasoft: The Jeff Minter Story Review". Nintendolife. Archived from the original on March 13, 2024.
- Romano, Sal (July 11, 2023). "Digital Eclipse announces The Making of Karateka for PS5, Xbox Series, PS4, Xbox One, Switch, and PC – first entry in Gold Master Series". Gematsu. Archived from the original on July 19, 2023.
- Romano, Sal (February 21, 2024). "Llamasoft: The Jeff Minter Story launches March 13". Gematsu.
- Stewart, Marcus (May 2024). "Preservation Through Play". Game Informer. Vol. 34, no. 366. Sunrise Publications. ISSN 1067-6392.
- Talbot, Ken (March 2024). "Mini Review: Llamasoft: The Jeff Minter Story (PS5) - A Trippy Odyssey Through a Yak's Brain". Push Square. Archived from the original on March 13, 2024.
- Thorpe, Nick (2024). "The Making of: Llamasoft: The Jeff Minter Story". Retro Gamer. No. 256. Future Publishing Limited. ISSN 1742-3155.
- Thorpe, Nick (2024). "Retrorated". Retro Gamer. No. 258. Future Publishing Limited. ISSN 1742-3155.
- Webster, Andrew (August 29, 2023). "Digital Eclipse is Preserving Classic Games in the Most Entertaining Way Possible". The Verge. Archived from the original on August 29, 2023.
