= List of video game auteurs =

This is a list of video game developers who have been described as auteurs. (Note: The name of the developer must be followed by the notable games on which they worked.)

- Hideo Kojima – Metal Gear, Death Stranding
- Fumito Ueda – Ico, Shadow of the Colossus, Last Guardian
- Shigeru Miyamoto – Mario, The Legend of Zelda
- Tetsuya Takahashi – Xenogears, Xenosaga, Xenoblade Chronicles
- Goichi "Suda51" Suda – Killer7, No More Heroes
- Hidetaka Miyazaki – Dark Souls, Bloodborne, Elden Ring, Sekiro: Shadows Die Twice
- Yasumi Matsuno – Ogre Battle, Vagrant Story, Final Fantasy Tactics
- Yoko Taro – Drakengard / Nier
- Keita Takahashi – Katamari Damacy
- Kazunori Yamauchi – Gran Turismo
- Masahiro Sakurai – Kirby, Super Smash Bros., Kid Icarus: Uprising
- Tim Schafer – Grim Fandango, Psychonauts
- Ken Levine – Bioshock, Bioshock: Infinite
- Edmund McMillen – The Binding of Isaac, Super Meat Boy, Mewgenics
- Ragnar Tørnquist – Dreamfall: The Longest Journey
- Éric Chahi – Another World
- Jeff Minter – Gridrunner, Attack of the Mutant Camels, Tempest 2000

== See also ==
- List of video game developers
- List of indie game developers
