= GoatUp 2 =

2013 video game

- Publisher: Llamasoft
- Series: The Minotaur Project
- Platform: iOS
- Release: March 2013
- Genre: Platform
- Mode: Single-player

GoatUp 2 is a platform game for iOS developed by Jeff Minter and Ivan Zorzin of Llamasoft and published via the App Store in 2013. It is the only Llamasoft game so far to include a level editor. The title screen gives the game's full name as "Buck! The story of GoatUp 2", a reference to the arcade game Rainbow Islands, and the game's interface and appearance resemble that platform with the exception that the font is the same Namco Galaga font used in Super Ox Wars.

== Gameplay ==
The player controls a goat, resembling the goat from the original GoatUp, which can freely move and jump around a 2D scrolling level. The objective is to collect a number of flashing objects (which have a different appearance on each level) and then to go to the level exit, represented by a London Underground sign. Enemies exist on the platforms and kill the goat immediately on contact; the goat also has a "hunger" meter, resembling the one included in Sheep in Space, which causes the goat to die if too much time passes without eating grass. Grass is found on most platforms and is eaten automatically but does not reappear once eaten.

Collected objects form a trail behind the goat; other objects collected can also join the trail without contributing to completion of the level. By tapping while the goat is in the air the user can cause the goat to fart, performing a midair jump and also releasing a burst of particles downwards which can harm enemies beneath. There is no limit to the number of midair jumps that can be performed in sequence as long as the player has enough objects available.

The gameplay is based on interactions with these and other objects, which include:

- Chicken Vindaloo, which grants unlimited farting for a period;
- Goat kids, who increase the score multiplier for the stage;
- Gravity redirectors that adjust the direction of gravity;
- The Queen's head, which prevents farting;
- Minotaurs, which award substantial bonus points;
- Cups of tea, which make the goat briefly invulnerable.

== Level Editor ==
GoatUp 2 includes a level editor which allows all items that appear within the main game to be placed. The game also contains a set of levels that serve as a tutorial for both using the editor and designing enjoyable levels. However, the game does not support iCloud or any other networking service, requiring the iOS device to be connected via USB to a computer in order to upload, download or share levels.

User engagement with the level editor has been low and few levels have been built or exchanged. Zorzin posted on the Yakyak Llamasoft forum discussing the game that "(Jeff Minter) spent MONTHS testing/debugging that editor (and all the game levels been done with it) .. I think this is the last (Llamasoft) game ever you'd see with an 'editor'.....This seems a case of 'extra effort did not give any results back'".

== Reviews ==
GoatUp 2 was awarded 9/10 by EuroGamer, and 8/10 by EDGE Online.
