= Moose Life =

2020 video game

- Publisher: Llamasoft
- Series: The Minotaur Project
- Platforms: Windows, PlayStation 4
- Release: 13 August 2020
- Genre: Shoot 'em up
- Mode: Single-player

Moose Life is a forward-scrolling shoot 'em up for Windows developed by Llamasoft. Similar to earlier Llamasoft games like Tempest 2000 and Polybius, Moose Life combines influences of early 1980s arcade video games with psychedelic visuals and electronic music to create a trance-like effect. It supports virtual reality using Steam VR and PSVR.

== Gameplay ==
The player controls a moose traveling on a forward-facing path with a plane of gameplay at the bottom of the screen and another, inverted, at the top. Players can move in any direction, but may only shoot forward, and can switch between the two planes with a button press. Collecting sheep, released by destroying a checkered ball, gains temporary invulnerability and a bonus if they are successfully brought to the end of the stage. Enemies drop power-ups in the form of pills that grant new abilities or perks.

There are 50 stages with pre-defined waves of enemies that appear in a semi-random layout. Like many other Llamasoft games, it saves the "best" state when a new level is reached, based on the highest number of lives, and allows players to restart from any of these points, rather than starting over every time.

== Development and release ==
Moose Life began as part of a planned follow-up to Minotaur Arcade Vol. 1, using the same voxel-based engine and framework. It was planned as a companion or "B-side" to a new version of Super Ox Wars, but after some promising development Llamasoft decided to shelve Super Ox Wars and focus on Moose Life as a stand-alone title.

The title was teased by a screenshot release on creator Jeff Minter's Twitter account on August 21, 2019. Its release was announced shortly before its release on July 30, 2020.

== Reception ==
Hardcore Gamer rated the title 4/5. Eurogamer gave a positive, unscored review, saying "This is a joyous game... As the levels pile up and the gimmicks flow, Moose Life makes me happier and happier."
