= Retro Gamer =

UK video game magazine

- Cover for the issue 266, featuring Tekken
- Editor: Martyn Carroll (2004–2005); Darran Jones (2005–present)
- Categories: Video game journalism
- Frequency: Monthly
- First issue: March 2004
- Company: Live Publishing (2004–2005); Imagine Publishing (2005–2016); Future Publishing (2016–present)
- Country: United Kingdom
- Language: English
- Website: retrogamer.net
- ISSN: 1742-3155

Retro Gamer is a British magazine, published worldwide, covering retro video games. It was the first commercial magazine to be devoted entirely to the subject. Launched in January 2004 as a quarterly publication, Retro Gamer soon became a monthly. In 2005, a general decline in gaming and computer magazine readership led to the closure of its publishers, Live Publishing, and the rights to the magazine were later purchased by Imagine Publishing. It was taken over by Future plc on 21 October 2016, following Future's acquisition of Imagine Publishing.

== History ==
The first 18 issues of the magazine came with a coverdisk. It usually contained freeware remakes of retro video games and emulators, but also videos and free commercial PC software such as The Games Factory and The Elder Scrolls: Arena. Some issues had themed CDs containing the entire back catalogue of a publisher, such as Durell, Llamasoft and Gremlin Graphics.

On 27 September 2005, the magazine's original publishing company, Live Publishing, went into bankruptcy. The magazine's official online forums described the magazine as "finished" shortly before issue #19 was due for release. However, rights to Retro Gamer were purchased by Imagine Publishing in October 2005 and the magazine was re-launched on 8 December 2005.

Retro Survival is a commercial CD retro games magazine put together by the freelance writers of Retro Gamer when Live Publishing collapsed. The CD was published in November 2005 and contains articles that would have appeared in Issue 19 of Retro Gamer, as well as several extras including a foreword by celebrity games journalist Mr Biffo.

In June 2004, a tribute to Zzap!64 was included, "The DEF Tribute to Zzap!64", celebrating the 20th anniversary of the Commodore 64 focused magazine.

It also includes interviews with leading 80s and 90s programmers, such as David Crane, Matthew Smith and Archer Maclean. Regular columns also feature such as Back to the 80s and 90s, Desert Island Disks (what games would a gaming celebrity take to a desert island) and From the Archives (a profile of a particular game developer or publisher).

The 'Making Of's' is a recurring feature in which well-known developers are interviewed about the creation and design process behind their games. Classic titles covered in past issues have included Breakout (Steve Wozniak), Dungeon Master (Doug Bell), Smash TV (Eugene Jarvis), Starfox (Jez San), Rescue on Fractalus! (David Fox/Charlie Kellner), Prince of Persia (Jordan Mechner), Berzerk (Alan McNeil), The Hitchhiker's Guide to the Galaxy (Steve Meretzky), Crystal Castles (Franz X. Lanzinger), Tetris (Alexey Pajitnov), Sheep in Space (Jeff Minter) Out Run (Yu Suzuki) and Splat! (Ian Andrew).

Issue 48 (February 2008) contained an exclusive interview with Manic Miner creator Matthew Smith, written by freelancer Paul Drury after a visit to Smith's family home in Liverpool.

March 2010 (issue 75) saw John Romero collaborating with Retro Gamer, taking on the role of 'Guest Editor', taking charge of the magazine's editorial and splashing his own unique style to a number of his favorite articles and subjects throughout the magazine.

The magazine celebrated its 200th issue in October 2019 and as of March 2026, the staff consists of Editor Darran Jones, Production Editor Tim Empey, and Art Editor Andy Salter.

The magazine posts its own issue preview videos on its YouTube channel, featuring editor Darran Jones and Production Editor Drew Sleep as hosts.

== Digital version ==
Three DVDs with 25 to 30 issues each have been released over the years:

- Retro Gamer eMag Load 1 (containing issues #1 to #30)
- Retro Gamer eMag Load 2 (containing issues #31 to #55)
- Retro Gamer eMag Load 3 (containing issues #56 to #80)

Retro Gamer is now available as an iOS app and can be downloaded onto iPhone and iPad.

== Awards ==
Retro Gamer won Best Magazine at the 2010 Games Media Awards.
