= James Lisney =

- Born: May 6, 1962 (age 64)
- Occupation: concert pianist
- Website: www.jameslisney.com

James Lisney (born 6 May 1962) is a British concert pianist. He studied with Phyllis Sellick and John Barstow – and early success was achieved after he gained representation by the Young Concert Artists Trust. He has gained particular distinction for his collaborative work with Emma Kirkby, Alexander Baillie and Paul Barritt, and has appeared as soloist with many major orchestras.

In the early 1980s he arranged the music for several of Jeff Minter's games for the Commodore 64, including Hover Bovver, Revenge of the Mutant Camels, and Sheep in Space.

Since 2000 he has pioneered two major initiatives: an innovative series of concerts at London's South Bank called Schubertreise - a concept that he has adapted to various other cyclic presentations in other European venues; and a record company called Woodhouse Editions to add to his previous discography on companies such as BIS, Olympia, Naxos, Carlton and Somm.

In 2009 he made his US debut with a short residency at Carnegie Hall and consolidated his work in the Netherlands with a solo debut at the Amsterdam Concertgebouw.

== Discography ==
- A Schubert Recital (2000), Olympia – James Lisney, piano
- Seasons (2000), Innovative Records – James Lisney, piano
- Amy Beach: Chanson d'Amour (2002), BIS Records – Emma Kirkby; James Lisney; Paul Barritt; Charles Medlam
- The Beethoven Sonatas for Piano and Violoncello (2004), Genuin – Alexander Baillie, violoncello; James Lisney, piano
- Schubert: Sonata in B flat, Impromptus, Grazer Fantasy, Drei Klavierstücke (2008), Regent – James Lisney, piano
- Thomas Schmidt-Kowalski: Cello Sonatas (2009), Naxos – Alexander Baillie, violoncello; James Lisney, piano
- Schubertreise volume 1, Woodhouse Editions – James Lisney, piano
- Schubertreise volume 2, Woodhouse Editions – Joy Lisney, violoncello; James Lisney, piano
- Johannes Brahms, Woodhouse Editions – Paul Barritt, violin; James Lisney, piano
- Beethoven: the complete works for piano and violin, Woodhouse Editions – Paul Barritt, violin; James Lisney, piano
- Beethoven: the complete works for piano and violoncello, Woodhouse Editions – Alexander Baillie, violoncello; James Lisney, piano
- Franz Schubert, Woodhouse Editions – James Lisney, piano
