= Human Engineered Software =

- Industry: Game development Software development
- Founded: 1980
- Defunct: October 1984
- Fate: Closed

Human Engineered Software (HES, also known as HesWare) was an American software developer and publisher from 1980 until 1984. The company sold video games and educational and productivity software, in addition to several hardware products. It focused on the Commodore 64, VIC-20, and Atari 8-bit computers.

== History ==
The company was located in Brisbane, California. Published titles included games, educational and productivity programs. Among them were Project Space Station, Mr. TNT, Turtle Graphics by David Malmberg, several Jeff Minter games (Llamasoft), such as Attack of the Mutant Camels, Gridrunner, Hes Games, and HesMon, Graphics BASIC, 64Forth (a cartridge-based Forth implementation), and the HesModem and HesModem II.

The company was started by Jay Balakrishnan and Cy Shuster in 1980. The company was founded in Balakrishnan's apartment in Los Angeles, where he took down the door to his bedroom, put it across two file cabinets, and used that as a desk for his development (winding the cables around the doorknob). With research into the PET ROM, Balakrishnan wrote the first 8K 6502 Assembler, HESbal (HES Basic Assembler Language) in BASIC, and an accompanying text editor, HESedit. Having HESbal allowed numerous creative follow-on products, such as HEScom, software and a user port cable that allowed VIC20 programs to be saved to a PET hard disk (since the first VIC20 didn't have a hard disk). Shuster soldered the HEScom cables in his garage and wrote HESlister, a print utility for BASIC programs, that he ported from a TRS-80 Model I to the PET, to the VIC, and later to the IBM PC. HESware published OMNIWRITER, a word processor for the Commodore 64.

Game writers Lawrence Holland and Ron Gilbert, who later worked for LucasArts, started their careers at HES.

== Demise ==
By early 1984, InfoWorld reported that HES was tied with Broderbund as the world's tenth-largest microcomputer-software company and largest entertainment-software company, with $13 million in 1983 sales. In October 1984, HES filed for bankruptcy. It was reported that Avant Garde Publishing Corp would buy HES in a straight cash deal, but later detailed that the offer was blocked in bankruptcy court and HES shut down.
