= Minotron: 2112 =

2011 video game

- Developer: Llamasoft
- Publisher: Llamasoft
- Platform: iOS
- Release: 2011
- Genre: Multidirectional shooter
- Mode: Single-player

Minotron: 2112 is a 2011 multidirectional shooter for iOS written by Jeff Minter and Ivan Zorzin of Llamasoft. It is a mobile remake of Llamatron for the Atari ST and Amiga, which itself is an updated version of the 1982 arcade game Robotron: 2084. It is the Minotaur Project game representing the Mattel Intellivision.

== Gameplay ==
The player controls a minotaur moving in a static 2-dimensional space. The objective is for the player to eliminate all enemies on the stage ("wave") in order to progress to the next. Enemies appear in a variety of surreal forms, including teapots, televisions, lightbulbs, and some shapes inspired by other classic arcade games such as Berzerk. Power-ups are also released as enemies and obstacles on the stage are destroyed. As the stages proceed, new enemies appear, including a Mandelbrot set, shaded arrows which play a Wilhelm scream when shot, lasers which fire across the entire screen, and the player ship from Minotaur Rescue. Existing enemies are also increased in power, gaining ability such as exploding into dangerous shrapnel or orbiting stars when destroyed.

Ruminant animals, such as sheep and camels, wander around on the stages; these can be "rescued" by touching them, awarding a score bonus at the end of the level. (They are equivalent to the "last human family" in Robotron: 2084.)

The game has 100 levels and two boss enemies: a giant toilet partway through the game, and Kevin Toms on level 99. After defeating this final boss, the wave number switches to two hearts and a final level plays which contains only beasties. Once all of these are rescued, the screen fades out to white with a feedback effect, and the game ends.

=== Controls ===
The game has several different control modes:

- In Simplified mode, the player moves the minotaur by sliding a single finger on the touchscreen; the minotaur automatically chooses its direction of fire, always aiming for the closest enemy.
- In Normal mode, the player must choose the direction of fire by swiping or sliding a second finger on the touch screen, while a "moving" finger is already in contact.
- In Assisted mode, the controls behave as in Normal mode but the player is assisted by a "droid" which moves and fires independently.
- In Hard mode, the controls behave as in Normal mode and there is no droid, plus the range of power-ups available is restricted.

== Reception ==
The game maintained a five-star rating on the iOS App Store and was named App Of The Week by The Register in April 2011, and received positive reviews from several other iOS gaming sites.
