= Defender 2000 =

1996 video game

- Developer: Llamasoft
- Publisher: Atari Corporation
- Producer: John Skruch
- Programmer: Jeff Minter
- Composer: Alastair Lindsay
- Series: Defender
- Platform: Atari Jaguar
- Release: NA: February 14, 1996; EU: February–March 1996
- Genre: Scrolling shooter
- Modes: Single-player, multiplayer

Defender 2000 is a 1996 scrolling shooter video game developed by Llamasoft and published by Atari Corporation for the Atari Jaguar. As part of Atari's 2000 series of arcade game revivals, it is an update of Eugene Jarvis' arcade game Defender (1981). The premise takes place in a future where the Alpha Promixian empire attack mining settlements on distant resource planets. Gameplay is divided into three modes, with the player acting as part of the System Defense Team commanding the Threshold ship to defeat waves of invading aliens while protecting humans.

In 1994, Atari and Williams Entertainment announced a joint venture to remake popular arcade games on the Jaguar and PC, including Defender, with Atari responsible for the Jaguar versions. Defender 2000 was programmed by Jeff Minter, who previously updated Dave Theurer's Tempest as Tempest 2000. The project came about when Minter approached Atari and suggested converting Defender to Jaguar. It was first planned as a cartridge release but was later moved to the Atari Jaguar CD add-on, however Atari changed course and decided to release the game on cartridge. The soundtrack was scored by English composer Alastair Lindsay, who also composed Tempest 2000.

The game garnered mixed reception from critics and retrospective commentators; praise was given to the "Classic Defender" mode for being a faithful adaptation of the arcade original, but others expressed mixed opinions regarding "Defender Plus" mode. Reviewers typically commented that Defender 2000, while reasonably fun, failed to update the original Defender to the point where its gameplay and graphics could stand out against contemporary shooters.

== Gameplay ==

Top: Classic Defender mode
Middle: Defender Plus mode
Bottom: Defender 2000 mode

Defender 2000 is a scrolling shooter game that offers three modes to choose from: "Classic Defender", "Defender Plus", and "Defender 2000". Classic mode is a recreation of the original arcade game Defender, offering similar graphics and gameplay. Plus mode is similar to Classic mode but with modernized visuals and minor gameplay additions. 2000 mode modifies and builds upon the original gameplay, introducing power-ups, more sophisticated enemy types, enhanced visuals, and bonus rounds. The plot takes place in a future where the Alpha Promixian empire attack mining settlements on distant resource planets.

In all three game modes, the player acts as part of the System Defense Team commanding the Threshold ship and the main objective is to defeat waves of invading aliens while protecting humans. The player controls the ship that flies from left to right with a radar at the top of the screen. The radar shows incoming enemies and humans across the playfield in different colors. Landers pick up humans and attempt carrying them to the top of the screen to become mutants. The player must shoot down the landers to rescue the human before it falls to its death. The player's ship has a standard laser fire and bombs capable of obliterating enemies caught within its blast radius. Failing to protect the humans causes the planet to explode and the level becomes populated with mutants.

In 2000 mode, power-up items appear in each level and are collected to obtain upgrades such as AI droids, a shield that protects the player from two hits, lightning laser, and rapid fire. Rescuing and catching humans will also grant extra firepower to the player's ship. If a human is abducted by a lander, they not only turn into mutants but also leave a falling tombstone capable of damaging the player's ship. Once the ship is fully powered up, collecting four warp tokens grants access to three-dimensional bonus rounds and the player skips five levels if they are successfully completed. The game features over 100 increasingly difficult levels and two difficulty modes: Tikka Masala and Vindaloo. Vindaloo mode is unlocked after completing the game in Tikka Masala mode.

Entering specific names on the high score table enables two easter eggs: "Plasma Pong" and "Flossie Defender". Plasma Pong is a graphically revised version of Pong (1972), while Flossie Defender replaces the ship and humans in Plus mode with a sheep and llamas respectively. The game features support for the ProController. In addition, the game also has a two-player option which allows two players to play by alternating turns.

== Development ==
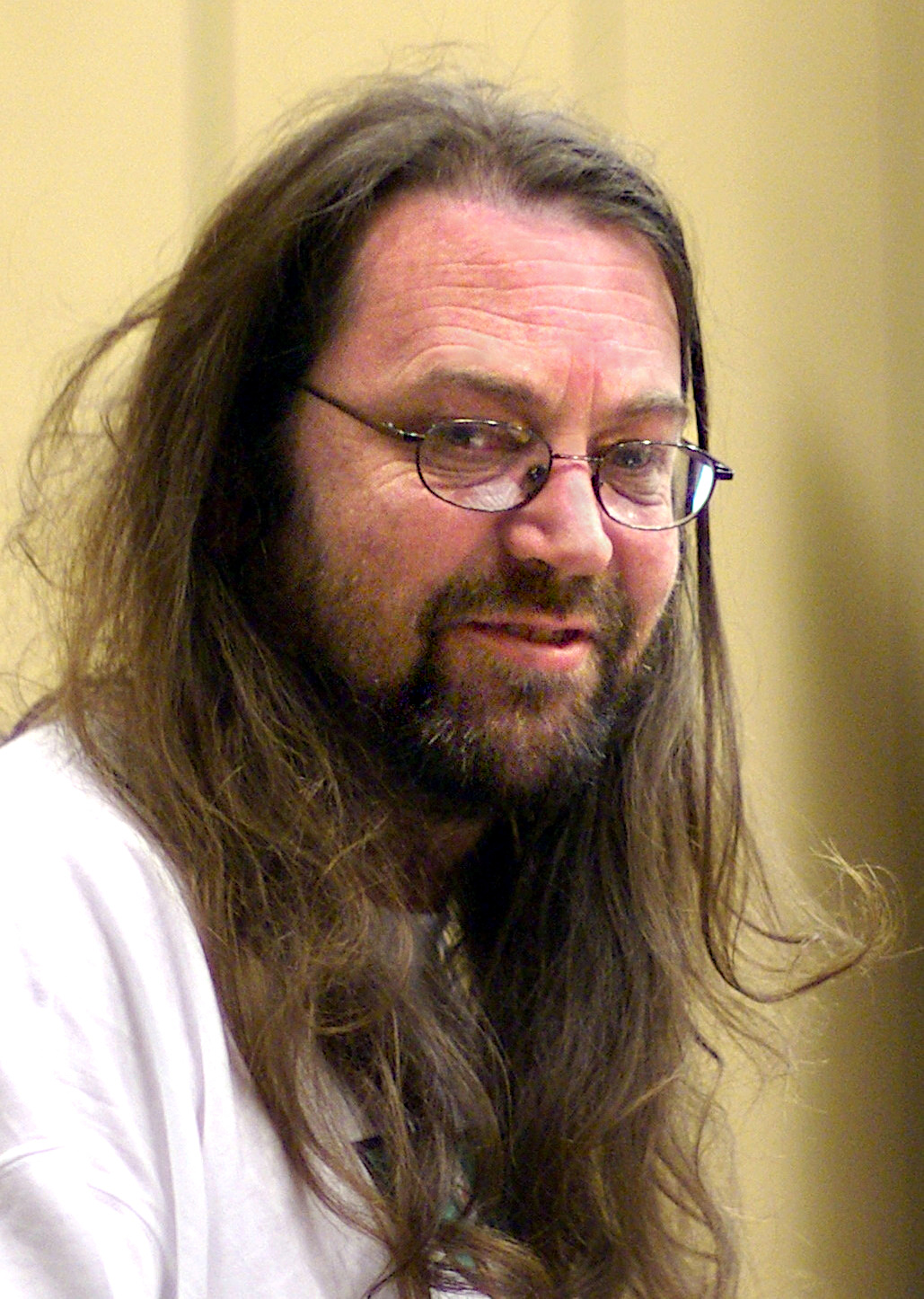
Defender 2000 programmer Jeff Minter pictured in 2007

Defender 2000 is an update of Eugene Jarvis' arcade game Defender (1981). In 1994, Atari Corporation and Williams Entertainment announced a joint venture to remake popular arcade games on the Atari Jaguar and PC, including Defender, Joust, and Robotron, with Atari responsible for the Jaguar versions. It is part of Atari's 2000 series of arcade game revivals, a strategy initiated by producer John Skruch after the release of Tempest 2000. It was programmed by Jeff Minter, founder of Llamasoft, who previously updated Dave Theurer's Tempest as Tempest 2000. The project came about when Minter approached Atari and suggested converting Defender, one of his favorite arcade games, to Jaguar. Atari assigned the project to Minter, who decided to join the company and move to Sunnyvale to facilitate his work.

Defender 2000 was initially planned as a cartridge release but was later moved to the Atari Jaguar CD peripheral. Minter wanted to make it in the same vein as Tempest 2000 but with smaller graphics and more abstract effects, and intended to use the extra space of the CD-ROM format for a documentary section featuring an interview with Jarvis. Minter met Jarvis at the 1994 Consumer Electronics Show and contacted him during production. Minter recalled that Jarvis advised him to reduce the difficulty of the original Defender, which was ported to Jaguar in a matter of weeks, to get his and Williams' approval for the game. The producers at Atari wanted larger sprites and parallax scrolling backgrounds because it was going to be on CD, pushing Minter in a direction he did not like. The graphics were designed by Metropolis Digital, a San Jose-based game developer founded in 1994, while the humans were animated via motion capture.

The music was scored by English composer Alastair Lindsay, who also composed Tempest 2000. Lindsay's soundtrack is inspired by dance and rave music that were popular at the time. Voice work for the game was done by lead tester Tal Funke-Bilu, who performed some of the samples in the office of Atari staffer Ted Tahquechi. However, Atari changed course for economic reasons and decided to release the game on cartridge, which led to the audio CD tracks being hastily converted into tracker music. A remixed version of Gridrunner was planned to be hidden in the game, but was scrapped due to time constrains and Minter being dissatisfied with it. Minter left Atari after Defender 2000 was completed in December 1995 and has since considered it not one of his best works. He said "Defender Plus" mode contained the ideas of where he wanted to go but did not have the freedom to make the game he wanted, expressing that it would have been better if he had stayed in Wales and done it independently. Jarvis considered it a great effort but lamented that the Jaguar never achieved commercial success.

== Release ==
Defender 2000 was first shown at the 1995 Winter Consumer Electronics Show, announced for release in August 1995. The game made additional appearances at tradeshows such as E3 1995 and the 1995 ECTS Autumn event. It was shown at Atari Corporation during "Fun 'n' Games Day", an event to showcase upcoming Jaguar titles to journalists between 1995 and 1996. The game was also covered by press invited to Atari's European offices, but was delayed to October 1995 and subsequently to December 1995. It was published by Atari in North America on February 14, 1996, followed by Europe between February and March that same year. Imagitec Design produced a CD soundtrack album for the game but it was never released. It was omitted from the Llamasoft: The Jeff Minter Story (2024), a Digital Eclipse interactive compilation of Jeff Minter's work, due to rights issues.

== Reception ==
Reception

Review scores
Publication	Score
Computer and Video Games	83/100
Edge	3/10
EP Daily	9/10
Game Players	81%
GamesMaster	79/100
Next Generation	3/5
ST Format	31%
Atari Explorer Online	4/5
Atari Gaming Headquarters	6/10
The Atari Times	75%
Atari World	7/10
Ultimate Future Games	68%

Award
Publication	Award
GamePro (1995)	Best Jaguar Game

Defender 2000 received mixed reception from critics. The "Classic Defender" mode stood out as its biggest draw. The Electric Playground's Victor Lucas said that Classic mode was better than the original Defender (1981), while Atari World's Iain Laskey considered it a near-perfect replica of the arcade original. Computer and Video Games' Tom Guise wrote that it was a faithful port, while Game Players' Mike Salmon felt Classic mode was strong enough to make it one of best titles on Atari Jaguar. Next Generation contended that Defender was only significant because of its originality and that the gameplay had not aged well. Edge criticized Classic mode for being a lame copy, while ST Format's Stuart Campbell labelled it as a poor arcade conversion.

Reviewers were divided regarding the "Defender Plus" mode. Atari Gaming Headquarters' Patrick Holstine considered Plus mode the strongest of the three game modes, while The Atari Times' Gregory D. George saw it was a better update compared to 2000 mode. Lucas found Plus mode to be the more fun of the two updated variants, while Laskey felt it was very playable. In contrast, Ultimate Future Games called Plus mode a terrible mix between the original Defender and 2000 mode.

The "Defender 2000" mode sparked many reactions. Guise found the gameplay in 2000 mode to be fast-paced and satisfying, while Holstine said that the 2000 mode is nowhere near the game that Tempest 2000 is. GamePro's Air Hendrix commented that while the game updated the arcade original's graphics for modern consoles, they were below average for that generation and the gameplay had not improved. Despite their bleak review, GamePro awarded it "Best Jaguar Game" of 1995 over Cannon Fodder. Lucas was disappointed with the 2000 mode due to its frenetic pacing and controls, while Laskey considered the 2000 mode to be too difficult. Campbell noted that is impossible to tell what is happening in 2000 mode due to the over-the-top visuals obscuring everything on-screen. Salmon said that it does nothing to update the gameplay of the original Defender, while Ultimate Future Games remarked that the game did not lend itself to a Tempest 2000-style update.

Retrospective commentary for Defender 2000 has been equally mixed. Brett Daly of Jaguar Front Page News (a part of the GameSpy network) lauded the game's visuals, soundscapes, and gameplay. IGN considered it one of the few games worth playing on the Jaguar. neXGam commended its three-game modes and soundtrack, but saw the large playview in 2000 mode and the controls as negative points. HobbyConsolas identified it as one of the twenty best games for the Jaguar.
