= Minotaur Rescue =

2011 mobile video game

Solar Minotaur Rescue Frenzy
- Publisher: Llamasoft
- Designers: Jeff Minter; Ivan Zorzin
- Platform: iOS
- Release: January 2011
- Genre: Multidirectional shooter
- Modes: Single-player, multiplayer

Solar Minotaur Rescue Frenzy, shortened to Minotaur Rescue for the iOS App Store, is a multidirectional shooter for iOS developed by Jeff Minter and Ivan Zorzin of Llamasoft and released in January 2011. It was Llamasoft's first iOS game. On the iPhone, the game supports up to two players at the same time. On an iPad, it supports up to four.

In 2010, Jeff Minter started what he called "the Minotaur Project": a series of games, each embracing the style of a particular 8-bit game system, but without the hardware restrictions that made designing games for them difficult. Minotaur Rescue is the first in the series, and is the Minotaur Project game representing the Atari 2600.

In 2016, Llamasoft pulled out of the iOS market, and its games, including Minotaur Rescue, are no longer available via the iOS App Store.

== Gameplay ==
The game resembles an enhanced version of Asteroids. The player controls a ship which can be moved around the screen, firing bullets at asteroids which appear from the edges of the screen. Destroying a sufficient number of asteroids completes a level and the player immediately advances to the next. When a large asteroid is shot, it breaks into a number of smaller asteroids; if an asteroid of the smallest size is shot, it is destroyed. Enemy spaceships also pass by from time to time, which have a number of types of attack: the simplest only attempt to ram the player's ship, but others may fire bullets, drop mines, or explode into shrapnel when destroyed.

Minotaur Rescue develops the game further by adding a central "Sun", which exerts gravity upon the player's ship, bullets, and the asteroids in a similar fashion to Gridrunner Revolution. Minotaurs may also appear when asteroids are shot, or directly from the edges of the screen; collecting these awards bonus points, increases a global score multiplier, and increases the fire rate of the player's weapon. They are also affected by the sun's gravity. When an asteroid or minotaur is pulled into collision with the sun, the asteroid or minotaur is destroyed and the sun expands, increasing the strength of the gravity it creates. If the sun expands beyond a certain point, a "black hole" appears, which causes the entire level to be subject to extremely strong gravity and rotational force until the level is completed.

The control system of the game was unique at the time of release: rather than placing a finger continuously on the touch screen, the ship is controlled by "stroking" the screen, with each stroke applying an appropriate impulse to the ship (based on the speed, length, and duration of the stroke) and automatically rotating it to fire in the direction of the stroke.

The player starts the game with three lives, and each ship also has three "shields" which absorb hits without a life being lost, and are regenerated every time a stage is completed. However, some hazards - such as collision with the sun or black hole, or with certain types of homing mines - bypass the shield and instantly kill the ship outright.

A final achievement is awarded when level 25 is completed, but there is no known end to the game.

The game has two additional modes: Deep Space Minotaur Madness mode removes the sun, but instead adds a lesser level of gravity to each asteroid. Survival mode gives the player only one life, and disables regeneration of shields between levels.

== Reception ==
The game has a rating of 73 on Metacritic indicating Mixed or average reviews.
