= OMNIWRITER =

Word processor

- Developer: HESware
- Operating system: Commodore 64
- Type: Word processor
- License: Proprietary

OmniWriter is a word processor for the Commodore 64 home computer HESware. Called the "dean of Commodore 64 word-processing programs" in Stewart Brand's Whole Earth Software Catalog and Review, OmniWritersold at a list price of US$79. It was specifically recommended for home business use.

The package included a reference card that fits around the Commodore's function keys, customizable colors and a scrolling 80-column width display. The maximum file size is 23 pages, but multiple files can be chained for printing. OmniWriter can import up to 240 columns of data from Microsoft Multiplan.
