= Tempest 4000 =

2018 video game

- Developer: Llamasoft
- Publisher: Atari
- Programmer: Jeff Minter
- Series: Tempest
- Platforms: PlayStation 4 Xbox One; Windows; Nintendo Switch; Atari VCS (2021 console)
- Release: PS4, Xbox One, Windows: WW: July 17, 2018; Nintendo Switch, Atari VCS: WW: March 22, 2022
- Genre: Tube shooter
- Mode: Single-player

Tempest 4000 is a tube shooter video game developed by Llamasoft and published by Atari, Inc in 2022. It is a modern reimagining of the 1981 arcade game Tempest. In Tempest 4000, players control a spaceship and navigate through a series of increasingly challenging levels while fighting off waves of enemies. Tempest 4000 was released for the 2021 Atari VCS console, PlayStation 4, Xbox One, Windows and Nintendo Switch.

The game features colorful, neon-filled graphics and a techno soundtrack that adds to its futuristic and immersive gameplay experience.

== Gameplay ==
Tempest 4000 is a shoot 'em up video game. Players take a control of the Claw, a spacecraft that can shoot at enemies and obstructions. Levels take place on geometric prisms. The goal of the game is to survive each level by eliminating enemies as soon as possible and to achieve high scores for leaderboard positions. The game features one hundred levels and three game modes: standard, pure, and endurance.

== Development ==
Tempest 4000 was developed by Llamasoft, a company founded by British video game designer and programmer Jeff Minter. The game supports native 4K resolution and features a soundtrack inspired by 1990s-era techno music.

Minter previously created Tempest 2000 for the Atari Jaguar in 1994—a remake of the 1981 arcade game Tempest, followed by Tempest 3000 for the Nuon in 2000. In 2014, Llamasoft released the Tempest-inspired video game TxK independently for the PlayStation Vita. Due to similarities between Tempest and TxK, Atari, SA blocked the release of TxK on other platforms. Minter was unhappy with Atari's intervention, but partnered with the company to create Tempest 4000. Tempest 4000 started out development as a virtual reality (VR) version of TxK but Atari forced the developer to remove the VR mode from the final game.

== Release ==
Tempest 4000 was announced August 2017, and the game was showcased later that month at Gamescom. The game was expected to release on Windows-based personal computers, and the PlayStation 4 and Xbox One video game consoles. Tempest 4000 was scheduled to be released on the PlayStation 4 on 28 March 2018 but was delayed, until in July and was released for multiple platforms.

Atari later announced that the game would be a launch title for their then-upcoming Atari VCS microconsole in 2019, but this was denied at the time by Llamasoft. The game was released for the Nintendo Switch and Atari VCS on March 22, 2022.

== Reception ==
Reception

Aggregate score
Aggregator	Score
Metacritic	76/100 (PC); 75/100 (PS4); 78/100 (NS); 75/100 (Xbox One)

The game received generally favorable reception according to Metacritic.
