= Akka Arrh =

2023 video game

- Developer: Llamasoft
- Publisher: Atari
- Designer: Jeff Minter
- Platforms: Atari VCS; Nintendo Switch; PlayStation 4; PlayStation 5; Windows; Xbox One; Xbox Series X/S
- Release: February 21, 2023; PlayStation 5; March 8, 2024
- Genres: Tower defense, multidirectional shooter
- Mode: Single-player

Akka Arrh is a 2023 tower defense multidirectional shooter video game developed by Llamasoft and published by Atari. It is based on a prototype which dates back to the 1980s but was never publicly released. It was released for Atari VCS, Microsoft Windows, Nintendo Switch, PlayStation 4 and 5, Xbox One and Series X/S.

== Gameplay ==
Players control a fixed turret shaped like ram's head being attacked by various enemies. The enemies want to steal pods from the player, which act as a health bar. Players can drop bombs on the enemies to destroy them. Enemies destroyed this way emit shockwaves that will further destroy any nearby enemies, causing chain reactions and giving increasingly large bonuses to players' score. Bombs have unlimited ammunition but reset the bonus to zero. Some enemies are immune to bombs and must be destroyed by shooting at them. This ammunition is limited to the number of enemies destroyed by bombs. Players can also find power-ups.

== Development and release ==
Akka Arrh was prototyped in 1982 at Atari, Inc. but was not released.

When Jeff Minter was allowed to remake a game from Atari's back catalogue, he chose Akka Arrh. He said the original game's design was "interesting but flawed" and lacked a compelling design to draw players back in when they lost.

Atari released Akka Arrh for Atari VCS, Windows, PlayStation 4, Xbox One and Series X/S, and Switch on February 21, 2023. Ports for PlayStation 5 and PlayStation VR 2 were made available on March 8, 2024.

On March 8, 2023, Atari announced a publishing agreement with Limited Run Games to release the game physically for the PlayStation 4, PlayStation 5, and Nintendo Switch in North America. On the same day, Atari entered into a similar physical distribution agreement with Numskull Games in PAL regions for the same systems.

== Reception ==
On Metacritic, Akka Arrh received positive reviews on Windows and mixed reviews on Switch and PlayStation 5. Eurogamer labeled it as essential and described it as an elegant game that turns chaos into choreography. Hardcore Gamer called it "an absolutely fantastic shooter" and praised its unique gameplay. Push Square enjoyed the combos, humor, and music, but they said it is not as addictive as other early Atari games. Describing it as "a real mixed bag", Gamezebo praised the aesthetics and unique gameplay, but they said it may be too bizarre and poorly explained for some people.
