= Caverns of Minos =

2012 video game

- Publisher(s): Llamasoft
- Platform(s): iOS
- Release: January 18, 2012
- Genre(s): Scrolling shooter
- Mode(s): Single-player

Caverns of Minos is a vertically scrolling shooter for iOS developed by Jeff Minter and Ivan Zorzin of Llamasoft and published via the App Store. It was announced on the Llamasoft blog on January 12, 2012. Its biggest influence is Caverns of Mars from 1981, but includes elements of Lunar Lander and Oids. It is the Minotaur Project game representing the Atari 8-bit computers.

== Gameplay ==
The gameplay resembles that of Caverns of Mars in that the player is required to descend to the bottom of a cavern, avoiding enemies along the way, and then to escape. Rather than blowing the cavern up, in Caverns of Minos the player's objective is to collect an object from the bottom of the cavern and deliver it to the "Mothersheep" that waits at the top of the cavern.

Unlike the original Caverns of Mars, the ship in Caverns of Minos does not descend at a fixed rate: it is sped up gradually by gravity and the player can choose to fire thrusters to slow it down or move it upwards. As the ship moves down through the cavern, it encounters numerous enemies, some of which can be destroyed by firing at them. The ship fires continuously but the bullets fired can be steered by tilting the mobile device. The ship also encounters minotaurs which can be rescued by landing the ship on the ground near them. Landing without damage requires careful use of the thruster and smoother landings are rewarded with bonus points.

The game supports four play modes, with a different ship provided to the player in each:

- Novice: the player's ship moves side-to-side and thrusts as normal, fires upwards and downwards, and has a strong shield.
- Pilot: the player's ship is more maneuverable and has a more effective thruster, but has a lower shield.
- Warrior: the player's ship fires from side to side as well as upwards and downwards, but has a lower shield.
- Commander: the player's ship does not move side-to-side but rather rotates and thrusts directionally.

== Reception ==
Caverns of Minos received positive reviews from London's Metro Magazine and G4TV. Arcade Life described it as "As close to perfect as an iOS arcade game can get." Pocket Gamer published a generally positive review, but criticized the game's surreal graphics and sound, describing it as "An accomplished shooter... but Minos is just plain weird and some won't be able to look past the madness."
