= Gridrunner Revolution =

2009 video game

- Developer: Llamasoft
- Publisher: Llamasoft
- Designers: Jeff Minter; Ivan Zorzin
- Composers: Mr. James Barth; Popof; DMX Krew; Jesper Dahlbäck; Lazersonic & Zak Frost; Dahlbäck & Dahlbäck; Proxy
- Series: Gridrunner
- Platform: Windows
- Release: 25 September 2009
- Genre: Shoot 'em up
- Mode: Single-player

Gridrunner Revolution is an action game developed by Llamasoft for Windows. It was released on 25 September 2009. Llamasoft released an updated version with integrated online scoreboards (and also reduced the price) in December of the same year. The game was made available to buy on Steam in February 2010.

== History ==
Gridrunner Revolution was originally named Gridrunner+++ to indicate its status as an enhanced version of Jeff Minter's earlier PC and Pocket PC game Gridrunner++. The original intention was to convert Gridrunner++ to XBLA with new graphics and gameplay mechanics, but after a near-complete version of the demo was submitted to Microsoft for approval for XBLA, Llamasoft received no response - neither positive or negative. They continued to develop the PC version of the game, which was originally intended to be released after the XBLA version as with Space Giraffe. In the course of adapting the game to be primarily a PC game, a number of improvements to the gameplay were added, which dramatically changed the play of the game. The name Gridrunner Revolution was suggested by Sin, a member of the YakYak forum to indicate this advancement.

== Gameplay ==
Minter has released a screenshot-based 'tutorial' on his yakyak.org forum detailing some of the basics of the game.

The game plays as follows:

Curving bullet shots to increase scoring rate.

- The game begins play as a straightforward "bottom-up" shooter as with Gridrunner++, but the player can (and is required to) rotate the ship. The game can still be controlled purely using the mouse; the mouse buttons rotate the ship, or the player may use the keyboard for this. An alternate game mode, "Thrusty Mode", has the mouse control the thrust vector of the player's ship, with rotation becoming automatic; this is unlocked when the second difficulty level is completed for the first time.
- "Sheepies" fall from the top of the screen at regular intervals; collecting a sheepie increases the score multiplier by 1 and upgrades the ship's weaponry. When the player's ship is destroyed, it is thrown slightly upwards and then begins to fall off the bottom of the screen; if it falls completely off the bottom, a life is lost. The player may move their ship left and right to cause it to bounce off active enemies, and collecting a sheepie in this state brings the ship back to life without a life being lost (a "sheepie save").
- The player can choose between several different ships, with different firing patterns. The player can switch between ships on the fly, using the keyboard or mouse wheel. Each ship represents one of the player's lives, so when a life is lost, so is the ship that was in use at the time and gaining extra lives makes new ships available. In addition, there are four "super ship types" that must be unlocked, by completing each of the four difficulty levels, in order to be added to the rotation of possible ships.
- Certain levels feature "suns", which cause the player's shots to bend with gravity. Using more intricate bullet routes to shoot enemies yields more points. Shooting at the sun eventually transforms it into a "black hole", which grants an extra ship and removes the normal 9x limit on the score multiplier. The sun or black hole may also fire shots at the player; on the earlier difficulty levels, the black hole does not fire, and thus opening the black hole may be used to stop the sun from firing. On the later difficulty levels, the black hole also fires.
- There are 50 stages, which can be played on multiple difficulty levels: Korma, Madras, Vindaloo and Phall, but the stages are not played in strict order; when first started, only levels 1–20 of Korma are available. When level 20 is completed, the player is deemed to have completed the mode, and levels 1–30 of Madras are unlocked; every level from 21–30 of Madras completed unlocks the corresponding level in Korma. This pattern continues through all of the difficulty levels.
- Simulated versions of the original VIC-20 and C64 releases of Gridrunner are included.

== Reception ==
Eurogamer - 8/10
Gamereactor - 8/10
Hardcore Gamer - 4.5/5
Wired News - 9/10
Destructoid - 7.5/10
GameSpot - Hands-On preview
Dead Pixel Live - 8/10
8-Bit Rocket - Grade A
