= Space Giraffe =

2007 video game

- Developer: Llamasoft
- Publisher: Llamasoft
- Designers: Jeff Minter, Ivan Zorzin
- Platforms: Xbox 360 (XBLA); Windows; Xbox One
- Release: Xbox 360; 22 June 2007; Windows; 15 December 2008; Xbox One; 21 January 2016
- Genre: Fixed shooter
- Modes: Single-player, multiplayer

Space Giraffe is a fixed shooter video game developed and published by Llamasoft for the Xbox 360. Llamasoft released a version for Windows on 15 December 2008. It was made available on Steam on 19 March 2009.

== Gameplay ==
Although the game is aesthetically similar to the arcade game Tempest, Minter has strongly denied that Space Giraffe is an update to Tempest, as it introduces significant gameplay changes.

The player controls the Space Giraffe as it moves around the outer rim of a 3-dimensional extruded surface. Enemies appear in notably greater quantities than in Tempest, beginning at the opposite end of the third dimension and approaching the player, firing bullets. The Giraffe can destroy these enemies by firing at them.

A line on the surface behaves as a VU meter, indicating the "power zone". Damaging or destroying enemies extends the Power Zone, and at all other times it slowly contracts, contracting more quickly when the giraffe is stationary. While the power zone is not at zero:

- The Giraffe can safely collide with enemies on the rim, knocking them off in the process (referred to as "bulling"). This attracts higher scores, especially if a large chain of enemies are bulled off the rim at one time. It can also increase the global bonus multiplier.
- Enemy shots are slowed down when travelling within the power zone;
- The Giraffe fires an additional two shots, which can be steered with the right analog stick;
- When an enemy spawns multiple other enemies, the spawned enemies appear at the power zone boundary.

The player can collect power-up "pods" which allow the Giraffe to jump; jumping also fills the entire power zone. The Giraffe can store up to five pods, and one is lost each time it jumps. Collecting extra pods when the giraffe already has five provides extra benefits: the first extra pod grants an extra life, the second grants Fast Bullets, and the third awards a token which counts towards accessing the bonus round, but only if no other pods were missed during the stage. Further pods collected provide bonus points.

Enemy shots can be targeted by the Giraffe's own shots, which has the effect of pushing them back. Although they can be pushed back beyond the far edge of the surface, they are never destroyed, and will resume moving forward again when able, possibly returning onto the surface and even destroying the Giraffe.

When a stage is completed, the Giraffe flies along the surface to the far end. During this period, all enemy shots remaining on the surface are harmless to the player, and the player scores a bonus for each one the Giraffe passes, based on the length of time that has passed since it was fired. If the player happens to collect a Pod while the Giraffe is leaving the surface, they are awarded Fast Bullets on the following round.

The player can use a Smart Bomb once per life, which automatically attacks the enemies nearest them.

== PC version ==
The PC version (released 15 December 2008) differs in a number of ways to the Xbox 360 version, including using a re-worked Neon engine which makes everything more presentable, less psychedelic and easier to see what's going on within the game. The new version also includes an "Acid Mix" that resembles the more intense graphics in the Xbox 360 release. On 20 March 2009 the game was made available for download from Steam. The PC version is priced noticeably higher than the console version. This is due to Minter's belief that people avoided the console version because of a poor perception of value.

== Development ==
The name "Space Giraffe" originated from Minter's posts on the Jeff Minter fan forum YakYak and on his blog in which he semi-seriously referred to the player's character in the game as resembling a giraffe. This immediately attracted calls from readers and forum posters that the entire game should be named Space Giraffe, and this was used as the working title for the game, and then adopted for the final release because by that time it had already been the subject of widespread publicity. Minter in an interview related:

...all over the place along with stories talking about 'Jeff Minter's new game Space Giraffe,' and in fact I rather liked that name, and so it's stuck. I don't think I need to call it anything other than Space Giraffe now, and indeed it's been so widely reported as such that I actually think it would be harmful to rename it now."

The game includes humor and references that are common to Minter's games, including allusions to Super Mario Bros., Pro Wrestling for the NES, The Hitchhiker's Guide to the Galaxy, the Commodore 64, and even to Microsoft's J Allard. Some of the early screenshots of the game include obscenity, though such obscenity does not appear in the release version. The inclusion of obscenity is Minter's known way of preventing mainstream gaming media from reproducing early work-in-progress screenshots, by rendering them unprintable.

== Reception ==
Reception

Aggregate score
Aggregator	Score
Metacritic	68%

Review scores
Publication	Score
Edge	8 of 10
GameSpot	7.5 of 10
IGN	4.7 of 10
Official Xbox Magazine (US)	2 of 10
PC Gamer (US)	92% (PC)
TeamXbox	4.3 of 10

Award
Publication	Award
Official Xbox Magazine	Worst Game of 2007

Reviews for Space Giraffe from both game critics and game players have been polarized. Jeff Minter has stated of the game, "It's like Marmite. You won't know unless you try."

The first published professional review of Space Giraffe came in Official Xbox Magazine's September 2007 issue. Dan Amrich ("OXM Dan") gave Space Giraffe a 2/10 rating, stating "You'll frequently die because you couldn't pick out the pulsating assassin from the warped playfield floating over the throbbing LSD nightmare that is the background, which makes this game uniquely aggravating." Minter has noted that the OXM review "basically spoiled our launch completely" stating that by the time more positive reviews came out the game was no longer getting promoted by Microsoft. OXM later named Space Giraffe the "Worst Game of the Year" for 2007 in March 2008.

Space Giraffe has received a more positive review from Angry Gamer, scoring an unusual "Holy crap this is awesome hell yes / 10". The reviewer 'Flamey' praised the addictive mood of the game, although on the Angry Gamer podcast, Space Giraffe was called "annoying and pointless", with a reviewer commenting of the creator of the game; "Jeff, we love you, we just don't love Space Giraffe." Conversely, veteran video game journalist Stuart Campbell described Space Giraffe as "one of the best games released this year at any price" but Campbell used the first letter of each paragraph to spell the phrase "MINTER IS A BIG TWATTY SPACKER TRUFAX". The February 2009 issue of PC Gamer awarded the PC version of the game a score of 92%.

Space Giraffe was also listed as 94th in Edge magazine's "The 100 Top Games to Play Today" list in the Edge 200th anniversary issue.

Space Giraffe was included as one of the titles in the book 1001 Video Games You Must Play Before You Die.

=== Sales ===
Space Giraffe sold almost 10,000 copies in its first two weeks of release. Minter himself has expressed disappointment at the low sales of Space Giraffe, especially in being outsold 10-to-1 by a remake of Frogger.

== Sound ==
=== Music ===
Playlist
Title	Artist	Type
Flossie's Frolic	Yak (Jeff Minter)	In-Game
Satipn	Redpoint	In-Game
Side of the Angels	Jim McCauley	In-Game
Gardening By Numbers	Redpoint	Bonus Level
Welsh Numbers Station	Catryn Burnell	Main Menu

Flossie's Frolic was created using Fruityloops by Jeff Minter. The song was later lost by Jeff, but recovered by a member of YakYak.org, eventually finding its way into Space Giraffe. The sheep vocals for the song were done by Flossie, Jeff's pet sheep, who has since died. The song also went by the name of "Silly.mp3."

Welsh Numbers Station uses a sequence of specially recorded Welsh numbers in the style of numbers stations. The bonus level music, Gardening By Numbers, also has similar numbers spoken in the background.

Before release, there was interest in licensing music used in Tempest 2000 (also used in Tempest 3000) from Atari, but no deal ever went through. Per Ivan Zorzin, one of the developers who worked on the game:

Now to make a bad story really short let's say so "forget to talk about anything with 'Atari' unless you have a really big wallet and you want to be raped".

=== Sound effects ===
Some of the sound effects that appear in the game also appeared previously in Gridrunner++, another game by Llamasoft released in 2002. The "mu-mu" noise that is heard when the player collects a power pod is a KLF sample from the track "What Time Is Love?".
