= Five A Day (video game) =

2012 video game

- App logo
- Developer: Jeff Minter
- Publisher: Llamasoft
- Series: The Minotaur Project
- Platform: iOS
- Release: 2012
- Genre: Multidirectional shooter
- Mode: Single-player

Five A Day is multidirectional shooter for iOS devices developed by Jeff Minter and Ivan Zorzin of Llamasoft and published via the iOS App Store. The game is a redevelopment of one of Minter's first attempts at iOS programming, and is loosely based on Time Pilot. Although it does not explicitly announce itself to be a Minotaur Project game, the distinctive font and coloration of the text appearing throughout the game is that of the Commodore 64. The game's title is taken from the 5 A Day healthy eating program.

== Gameplay ==
The player controls a spaceship which remains in the centre of the screen while the game environment scrolls around it. The ship fires continuously in the direction it is pointing, with its bullets remaining in the coordinate system of the screen rather than the environment. The objective is for the player to shoot down enemy ships without colliding with them. Certain enemy ships will be using tractor beams to tow fruit, vegetables, and occasionally minotaurs behind them. Destroying these enemies will free the carried item allowing the player's ship to collect it. Collected items form a chain behind the spaceship, and these items can deal damage to enemies they hit. If enemies carrying items are not destroyed in time, they will pull the carried items in, which causes them to turn green and gain extra attacking power.

When a sufficient number of enemies are destroyed, a boss appears; a single enemy which fires a large number of bullets and is usually resistant to the ship's own bullets while being vulnerable to the trail of fruit. Once the boss is destroyed, the player moves on to the next stage.

Each game level is represented as a "day" and is divided into five stages: Haytime (Breakfast, referring to the feeding of sheep), Crunchtime (Work, referring to the Crunch Time experienced by game programmers), Nicecupofteatime (Tea break), Currytime (Dinner), and Sheepenumerationtime (Night, a reference to Counting sheep). Provided at least one fruit is collected from each of the five stages on a day, a "5 a day bonus" of an extra life is awarded. If any stage is completed with no fruit collected, the extra life cannot be awarded for that day. This produces the message "Fruitless - you've lost your way to five a day!", a reference to a slogan frequently used by the 5 A Day healthy eating promotions.

== Reception ==
Five A Day received positive reviews from Pocket Gamer, Arcadelife, and Kill Screen. It was Paste's Mobile Game of the Week.
