= Traxx (video game) =

1983 video game

- Developer: Salamander Software
- Publisher: Quicksilva
- Designer: Jeff Minter
- Platforms: VIC-20, ZX Spectrum
- Release: 1983
- Genre: Maze
- Modes: Single-player, multiplayer

Traxx is a maze video game released in 1983 by Quicksilva for the ZX Spectrum (48K) and VIC-20 (+8K). The gameplay is similar to Amidar, where the goal is to color all of the lines on a grid of equally-sized squares. Unlike Amidar, the rectangles of the are not filled-in when surrounded.

== Gameplay ==
The player moves along a rectangular grid painting all of its sections. The level ends when the entire grid has been painted. Various enemies also inhabit the grid and will try to kill the player. Options are available to change the speed of the game and number of enemies on screen.
