= Unity (video game) =

- Developer: Jeff Minter
- Publisher: Lionhead Studios
- Designer: Jeff Minter
- Platform: GameCube
- Release: Planned for 2005, cancelled 10 December 2004
- Genres: Shooter, Music

Unity was a video game being developed by Jeff Minter and Lionhead Studios for the GameCube. It was in development from the beginning of 2003 until its cancellation at the end of 2004. It was to feature Jeff Minter's trademark psychedelic graphical style, meshed with an interactive music component. The music was to be provided by someone who was well-known and appropriate for the game's style, revealed in 2023 to be Plaid.

Unity was so highly anticipated that the UK games magazine Edge featured it on its February 2003 issue cover, with a full 8 page preview in the same issue. However, the project slipped off the release schedules soon after.

Unity's cancellation was officially announced on Lionhead's website on 10 December 2004. Minter and Lionhead both cited the "ambitious and experimental" nature of the project as reason for the mutual decision to cease development. Peter Molyneux was quoted as saying "...it was becoming increasingly apparent to us that we would not be able to finish Unity in an acceptable time frame."
