= Polybius (2017 video game) =

2017 shoot 'em up video game

- Developer: Llamasoft
- Publisher: Llamasoft
- Platforms: PlayStation 4 Windows
- Release: PlayStation 4 May 9, 2017; Windows; December 21, 2018
- Genre: Shoot 'em up
- Mode: Single-player

Polybius is a 2017 shoot 'em up video game developed and published by Llamasoft. It was released in May 2017 for the PlayStation 4, with PlayStation VR support available. A version for Windows was released in December 2018. The game takes its name and inspiration from the fictitious 1981 arcade game and urban legend of the same name. It is also inspired by games like TxK and aims to induce the psychological state of flow. It was positively received by critics.

== Gameplay ==
Llamasoft's Polybius is a fast-paced 3D shooting game with elements of racing games. The game's play was designed to minimize virtual reality sickness by the use of continuous forward motion with limited abrupt changes and no interruptions to gameplay other than controlled breaks at the end of each level; however, the game does include intense visuals. Although designed as a VR game, Polybius is fully playable in 2D on a standard PlayStation 4, and also includes support for 3D television output.

== Development and release ==
In 2016, Llamasoft announced a game called Polybius for the PlayStation 4 with support for the PlayStation VR. Polybius was added on the PlayStation store on Tuesday May 9, 2017. In early marketing, co-author Jeff Minter claimed to have been permitted to play the original Polybius arcade machine in a warehouse in Basingstoke. He later more realistically stated that the game was inspired by the urban legend, but does not attempt to reproduce its alleged gameplay. He said it was instead based on his interest in the ability of video games to induce the psychological state of flow (also called "being in the zone") and his own observations of positive psychological effects as a result of playing VR games, most notably the unreleased VR version of TxK. Minter also cited influence from multiple other classic games including Space Harrier, After Burner, the 1983 vector game Star Wars, S.T.U.N. Runner, Zarch and quite possibly NanoTek Warrior.

On July 13, 2017, industrial rock band Nine Inch Nails released a music video for the song "Less Than", featuring a woman playing Polybius. Llamasoft later described the version of the game used in the video, a custom build running on the PC with user configurable effect sequencing.

On December 21, 2018, the game was released for PC, playable in VR or non-VR.

== Reception ==
Reception

Aggregate score
Aggregator	Score
Metacritic	84/100 (PS4)

Review scores
Publication	Score
Destructoid	8/10
Edge	9/10
Eurogamer	(positive)
Metro	9/10

Polybius received positive reviews from game critics. On review aggregator Metacritic, it holds an average score of 84 out of 100, based on 13 reviews, indicating "generally favorable reviews". Metro called it "one of the definitive action games of the current generation". Eurogamer awarded it a Recommended trophy, labeling it as "magical" as well as one of Llamasoft's best works. The website also ranked it 44th on their list of the "Top 50 Games of 2017". The game was nominated for the Coney Island Dreamland Award for Best Virtual Reality Game at the New York Game Awards 2018.

== See also ==
- Polybius, ancient Greek historian
- Polybius, an urban legend that the game takes inspiration from.
