= Deflex =

1981 video game

- Developer: Llamasoft
- Publisher: Llamasoft
- Designer: Jeff Minter
- Platforms: VIC-20, Commodore 64, ZX81, PET, ZX Spectrum; Re-releases; Pocket PC, Windows, iOS
- Release: 1981
- Genre: Action
- Mode: Single-player

Deflex, also known as Made In France, is an action game developed by Jeff Minter. The versions for the VIC-20 and Commodore PET in 1981 were the first games by Minter's own Llamasoft.

== Gameplay ==
The gameplay in all versions follows the same basic mechanic. A ball bounces around the screen, moving in cardinal directions only and bouncing off at 180 degrees when it strikes the side of the screen. By pressing a key (or moving the joystick or touching the touchscreen), the player can cause a paddle to appear at the ball's current location, making the ball immediately bounce off the paddle and turn either left or right. Once placed, a paddle remains on screen, forcing the ball into more and more complex bouncing patterns. In addition, whenever the ball strikes a paddle, the paddle's direction is reversed. The objective of the game is to guide the ball to touch a randomly placed target that appears on screen. When the target is touched, score is awarded and a new target is placed, although all existing paddles remain. The player loses the game if a target is not touched within a time limit.

The original PET/VIC-20/ZX81 version displays one target at a time, and there is a single level which never ends.

== Ports ==
The Commodore 64 version of Deflex is called Made In France (because the programmer was actually in France at the time he programmed that part of the game) and was posted as a free download to the Compunet service. The gameplay is the same as the original version. This was also included as an easter egg in the game Iridis Alpha, where it identified itself only as "MIF BY YAK".

Deflex for the Pocket PC was later released and ported to Microsoft Windows. The game is divided into levels with each level having a pre-determined layout of multiple targets and sometimes pre-placed walls. The player must collect all targets on the level within the time limit and number of lives. Hazardous objects instantly cost the player a life if the ball touches them, with the message "You clumsy donkey!"

The most recently released version is for iOS. This follows the same level-based structure as the PocketPC version, but the time limit returns to being between collection of individual targets rather than for the whole level, and touching a hazardous object deducts an amount of time rather than instantly losing the level. Placing paddles also deducts a small amount of time. Any previously reached level can be replayed. The ball may be precisely placed to touch multiple targets at the same time; doing this multiple times in series awards additional points. The soundtrack is composed of piano chords and arpeggios triggered by events in the game and voice-over reminiscent of Fluttershy from My Little Pony. Llamasoft stopped supporting iOS, and all of its games were removed from the app store.
