= Gridrunner++ =

2002 video game

- Developer: Llamasoft
- Publisher: Llamasoft
- Designer: Jeff Minter
- Series: Gridrunner
- Platforms: Mac OS X, Windows
- Release: 2002: Mac, Windows
- Genre: Shoot 'em up
- Mode: Single-player

Gridrunner++ is a shoot 'em up written by Jeff Minter for Pocket PC, then for Windows. It has since been ported to Mac OS X and iOS. It was only available as shareware for download from the Llamasoft website, with a registration fee of £5. It was followed-up by Gridrunner Revolution (2009) and Gridrunner iOS (2012).

== Gameplay ==
The player controls a spacecraft with the mouse. A series of enemies appear and attack the craft; the player must destroy all enemies on the stage to complete it. Enemies that are part of the current stage but have not yet begun to attack can be seen as glowing lines in the background.

The player's ship fires bullets upwards continuously, which are used to attack the enemies. If the player's ship contacts an enemy, it is immediately destroyed.

Small circular "pods" may be left on the stage in the locations where enemies are killed; some stages include special enemies which drop pods directly onto the stage in lines. Pods can be destroyed by shooting them. They destroy the player's ship if the player collides with them, and if left unattended eventually explode sending out lines in the four cardinal directions. These lines are also fatal to the player's ship.

Finally, at intermittent moments the "XY zapper" is activated: four sets of lines begin to converge on a particular location on the screen. When they do, the player's ship is destroyed if it is aligned with that location either horizontally or vertically.

As the player scores points, sheep (referred to as "sheepies") begin to drop from the top of the screen. These sheepies have several different effects:

- Collecting sheepies increases the firepower of the player's ship, and enables it to fire backwards.
- Collecting a tenth sheepie activates "the pill", a smaller sheep which moves around the screen destroying enemies on the player's behalf.
- Normally, all sheepies are lost when a new stage begins, but collecting a sheepie in the short hang-time between the end of the stage and the start of the next will cause the first sheepie on the new stage to flash, indicating that collecting it will restore the sheepie count from the previous stage. This is referred to as a "Continuity Sheepie".
- When the player's ship is destroyed, the falling wreckage can be steered, and if the centre point of the wreckage lands on an uncollected sheepie then the player's ship is resurrected and no life loss occurs (although no other benefit arises from collecting the sheepie). This is referred to as a "Sheepie Save".

=== Ending ===
The registered version of the game has 50 levels, ending with "Love Sheepie Plushophilia", a level where the enemies are copies of Jeff's own avatar from the message board. When this stage is completed, a photograph of one of Jeff's real pet sheep appears over the game field accompanied by a congratulations message and the enigmatic note: "Shysheep salutes you with stars in her nose!". The game then restarts from the first level, with score and lives retained.

== Special edition ==
The "Special Edition" of Gridrunner++ was originally created for a gathering of members of the Llamasoft message board taking place in London. It was originally only available at that gathering or via word of mouth from those who had attended. It was later released by Jeff for download but has been removed from the Llamasoft Archive site, due to it being played without buying the standard (registered) version first. The Special Edition is based on the registered version of Gridrunner++ and no trial version of it exists. The Special Edition features the following changes:

- The main title reads "Gridrunner++ London Jolly 2 Special Edition".
- The sheep picture on the opening title page is replaced by a picture of a plate of Vindaloo.
- The displayed play area is much larger and has a larger horizontal dimension than vertical.
- Enemies move much faster, making the game much harder than the standard version.
- The player's ship can fire horizontally by holding down the left mouse button.
- The "secret" ships from the original version are the defaults in the Special Edition.
- Whenever the player's ship is destroyed, one of several samples of a group of people swearing is played. This group is actually composed of all the people who attended the board gathering who met up in Jeff's hotel room in London and were sampled on his laptop.
- Numerous other samples are added or altered.
- An extra "endurance mode" option is added, in which the player aims to score the highest amount possible on one life.

== Ports ==
The Mac version has several additions to the Windows version including live online scoreboards and "Turbo Nutter Mode" which allows the player to enjoy the game at double speed. It was converted to the Mac by Gary Liddon.
