= Revenge of the Mutant Camels =

1984 video game

- Developer: Llamasoft
- Publisher: Llamasoft
- Designer: Jeff Minter
- Platforms: Commodore 64, Amiga, Atari ST, MS-DOS
- Release: 1984: C64; 1992: Amiga, ST, PC
- Genre: Scrolling shooter
- Modes: Single-player, multiplayer

Revenge of the Mutant Camels is a horizontally scrolling shooter written by Jeff Minter for the Commodore 64 and published by Llamasoft in 1984. Enhanced versions for the Atari ST, Amiga, and IBM PC were released in 1992 as shareware.

== Gameplay ==
Screenshot from the original Commodore 64 game.

A sequel of sorts to Attack of the Mutant Camels (also known as Advance of the Mega-Camels), this time the player controls a camel. The camel is armed by default with small blue shots, but can obtain other weapons and weapon upgrades by collecting power-ups during the game. In all but the Commodore 64 version, the camel is teamed up with a bipedal goat, who can be controlled either by the computer or by a second player. If the camel crouches down, the goat can mount it and ride on its back, enabling them to focus their firepower.

The game features a host of bizarre enemies, including: British telephone boxes, Polo mints, exploding sheep, skiing kangaroos, guys sitting on flying toilets, and even the jet plane controlled by the player in Attack of the Mutant Camels and a wave of Jeff Minters. In versions other than the Commodore 64 version, a variety of power-ups are available, including ecstasy tablets (for a turn of speed), spliffs (to fly over life's troubles), and apples (because they're good for you).

Unlike Attack of the Mutant Camels, it is possible for the player to win Revenge. After 42 waves of enemies are defeated the player is declared the winner. In the Commodore 64 version, this was indicated simply by the message "WELL DONE! YOU HAVE SAVED CAMELKIND!" being briefly flashed over the playfield before the game restarted on the first level.

== Development ==
Revenge of the Mutant Camels was announced in the Dec 1983/Jan 1984 issue of Commodore Horizons with a prospective release for mid-December 1984. The game was written over a two month period.

Ideas for various attack waves were created by Minter whilst on holiday in Crete and written down in a notebook. An innovation at the time was that this was the first UK program to use a fast loader – the German TURBO system. Minter was influenced by the reaction to the game Manic Miner having 20 levels, and so improved on this by creating 42 different levels for Revenge.

The theme music for the Commodore 64 version was arranged by James Lisney and was based on Ballet égyptien by Alexandre Luigini.

== Legacy ==
Llamasoft developed a sequel to Revenge of the Mutant Camels entitled Revenge of the Mutant Camels II for the PC. It was published by Kool Dog Entertainment, a division of Guildhall Leisure which has since closed down. Due to poor sales and reception the title was withdrawn from shelves just weeks after release. The plot is a continuation of the story from the original Revenge of the Mutant Camels.

For Amiga, Revenge of Mutant Camels II was released with poor reception by Mastertronic in 1988. This release did not involve Minter himself, but in 1992 Minter released his own Amiga version entitled simply Revenge of the Mutant Camels as a shareware game (this is similar to the Atari ST version).

Almost 40 years after its first release, in 2021 Jeff Minter fixed a bug on collision detection in the Commodore 64 version.
