= GoatUp =

2011 video game

- App icon
- Publisher: Llamasoft
- Series: The Minotaur Project
- Platform: iOS
- Release: 2011
- Genre: Platform
- Mode: Single-player

GoatUp is a platform game for iOS developed by Jeff Minter and Ivan Zorzin of Llamasoft and published via the App Store in 2011. It is the first platform game from Llamasoft. According to Minter, the three main influences were Canyon Climber and Miner 2049er for the Atari 8-bit computers and a homebrew Atari 2600 game called Man Goes Down. It is the Minotaur Project game representing the ZX Spectrum.

== Gameplay ==
The goat uses her kids to destroy an ox while a billy goat waits above.

The player controls a goat which can move from left to right, and jump upwards, on a series of vertically scrolling platforms. The vertical scroll continues at a fixed rate regardless of the goat's position; if the goat falls or is scrolled off the bottom of the screen, the game ends immediately. Each platform is covered with grass; moving left or right on a platform causes the goat to eat the grass, scoring points and causing further score bonus objects to appear on the platform, which can be collected by moving over them. No points are scored for merely jumping upwards, meaning the player must balance the need to escape from the edge of the scroll with the need to remain where they are to collect points.

Billy goats appear on certain platforms. Touching one of these causes an explosion of hearts to appear. After this point, once a certain amount of grass has been eaten, a kid will spawn which follows behind the player's goat (the player's goat is, therefore, a nanny goat—and is acknowledged as such by Llamasoft—in spite of many reviews referring to the player's goat as "he"). Multiple kids form a trail which extends behind the player's goat as it moves. Kids are not negatively affected by being scrolled off the screen. They cannot eat grass, but they can collect the scoring items and power-ups revealed by doing so. The number of kids the player has acts as a multiplier for the score value of grass and items.

Later platforms include hostile enemies. If the player's goat touches one of these, the goat is forced into an uncontrolled jump and a kid is lost. If the player has no kids, the uncontrolled jump is the only penalty, although this may cause the goat to fall off the bottom of the screen and the game to end. However, if the player can arrange for the trail of kids to touch an enemy without the nanny goat doing so, the enemy is destroyed, giving a score bonus.

=== Controls ===
GoatUp can be controlled using the touch screen or the tilt sensor. The tilt sensor is the default on iPhone, and the touch screen the default on iPad; there is no other difference between the platform. GoatUp also supports the iCade.

== Reviews ==
GoatUp has received positive ratings from Pocket Gamer and TouchGen. It was awarded Gaming App of the Day on Kotaku. As of Jan 2012 it has a MetaCritic score of 80.
