= TxK =

2014 video game

- Developer: Llamasoft
- Publisher: Llamasoft
- Designer: Jeff Minter
- Platform: PlayStation Vita
- Release: NA: February 11, 2014; EU: February 12, 2014
- Genre: Tube shooter
- Mode: Single-player

TxK is tube shooter video game designed by Jeff Minter. It was published for the PlayStation Vita on February 11, 2014. The game was planned for release on other platforms until Atari made legal threats against Llamasoft due to similarities between TxK and Tempest 2000.

TxK is based on the 1981 arcade video game Tempest, adding power-ups which grant abilities to the player. The option is available to play without power-ups.

== Reception ==
The game received positive reviews upon release, garnering a score of 84 out of 100 on the review aggregation website Metacritic.

IGN found the updated art style "overwhelming at times" but appreciated the "winning soundtrack and forgiving save system". They said "In the end, I simply couldn't put it down." The game was also praised by Edge magazine who noted the "wonderfully crisp" presentation and declared it to be "twitch gaming at its finest." They concluded by stating "Dynamic, thrilling and wholly invigorating, TxK isn't just one of the best games on Vita: it might just be the best Minter's ever made, too."

== Legal troubles and legacy ==
On March 18, 2015, Minter posted on Twitter that Atari had made legal threats and issued cease and desist orders due to similarities between TxK and Tempest 2000. He stated that to be unable to release the game on other platforms, but the Vita version was still available.

In 2023, Atari published Llamasoft's Tempest 4000.
