= Llamatron =

1991 video game

- MS-DOS title screen
- Publisher: Llamasoft
- Designer: Jeff Minter
- Platforms: Atari ST, Amiga, MS-DOS
- Release: Amiga, Atari ST: NA: 1991; MS-DOS: NA: 1992
- Genre: Multidirectional shooter
- Modes: Single-player, multiplayer

Llamatron (stylized Llamatron: 2112 on the title screen) is a multidirectional shooter video game programmed by Jeff Minter of Llamasoft and released in 1991 for the Atari ST and Amiga and in 1992 for MS-DOS. Based on Robotron: 2084, the player controls the eponymous creature in an attempt to stop an alien invasion of Earth and rescue animals—referred to as "Beasties"—for points. The goal is to destroy all of the attackers on each level using a laser. Llamatron supports the twin-stick shooter controls of Robotron, but also provides a single-joystick mode: the llama automatically fires in the direction it is moving and holding the fire button locks that angle of fire, even if the Llama changes direction. Power-ups aid the player in defeating the wide variety of enemies they face along the way.

Released in the later years of the Atari ST and Amiga, Llamatron was distributed as shareware, containing the full game and a request to register the program for £5 if the user enjoyed the game. As of March 1992, at least 800 people had registered the game, making it unusually successful for shareware distributed without locked features or other purchase incentives. Reviews of both the Atari ST and Amiga versions praised its addictive gameplay, sound effects, and value for the registration price. Minter released a remake of the game for iOS, Minotron: 2112, in 2011.

== Gameplay ==
Llamatron is a multidirectional shooter where the objective is to stop an invasion of Earth that is being launched by alien mutants known as the Zyaxxians. The player's character—the eponymous Llamatron—is placed in the center of a black screen, with enemies—labelled in-game as "Grunts"—scattered across the playing area. Once the level begins, the enemies move towards the player and, if any of the enemies come into contact with the llama, the player loses a life. The player's goal is to destroy every enemy on the screen with the llama's laser, which fires automatically in the direction that the llama is facing. Players can also use a second joystick to control the direction of fire or hold the firing button down to lock the firing direction regardless of movement. The keyboard can also be used instead of a joystick. The game includes modes that allow a second player, or an indestructible computer-controlled "droid", to assist the Llamatron.

The player gains points by destroying enemies and collecting llamas, sheep, goats, and camels—known collectively as "Beasties"—that are placed on the screen at the start of the level. Upon destroying all of the enemies on a screen, the player advances to the next level. Some levels, known as "Herd Waves", also require the player to collect all of the "Beasties". "Grunts" take a variety of forms, including Coca-Cola cans, kitchen utensils, cherries, Space Invaders, Eyes of Providence, televisions, fire hydrants, Zippy the Pinhead, marijuana plants, and Rizla rolling papers. Blue brains chase after the "Beasties" and transform them into "Zombeasts", who then attempt to rush and kill the player. Other enemies include indestructible devices that shoot screen-wide lasers, 16-ton weights that attempt to crush the player, hedgehogs that explode into spikes when destroyed, Mandelbrot sets that shoot projectiles and scream when hit, and a large toilet that throws rolls of toilet paper at the player. The game contains 100 levels, in addition to a tutorial and a high-score table.

The player can collect power-ups to assist them in their task, such as smart bombs that damage all of the enemies, extra lives, invincibility, and hearts that attract the "Beasties" to the player. There are also items that allow shots to bounce off of walls, split into three, and become "hot bullets", which deal extra damage. "Warps" add 50,000 points and immediately move the player ahead five levels. The "Floyd bonus" grants extra points and is shaped like the artwork from Pink Floyd's The Dark Side of the Moon album. In two-player mode, each player shares the score and the power-ups, but both players lose a life if one player dies.

== Development and release ==
The llama, near screen center, is shooting to the left (Amiga).

Llamatron was developed by Jeff Minter of Llamasoft software. It was intended to be an updated version of the Williams Electronics title Robotron: 2084 with expanded and refined features. Llamatron was released in 1991, first for the Atari ST, and then for Amiga computers. A version for MS-DOS came out in 1992. The Atari ST and Amiga releases contain sound effects, but no background music.

The program was distributed as shareware, with the full game being available for free to try, but requesting that players register the game for £5 if they enjoyed it. At the time of its release for Amiga computers, people who registered would receive another game from Llamasoft, a poster, and a newsletter. Its release was described as an "experiment", in that it neither required the player to buy the full game at a cost of £25, as was common for most commercially-distributed titles, nor was it crippleware that disabled certain features until the game was registered.

== Reception ==
Llamatron received positive reviews upon its initial Amiga release. Amiga Computing featured Llamatron as the cover disk for its October 1991 issue, summarizing their positive review by saying "All in all, the most apt comment one can make about Llamatron is that Mr Minter makes exceedingly good shoot-'em-ups." Amiga Format reviewed the game in their September 1991 issue, giving it a score of 89% and highlighting its "simple gameplay [that] is fast and massively addictive." The review mentioned several sound and graphical glitches, as well as occasional problems with collision detection, but overall recommended it as having "superb value". Amiga Power, reviewing the game in August 1991, gave it four stars out five, criticizing the graphics as having a "slightly cluttered and unclear look", but praising it overall as "[a]n excellent game that deserves to be supported by anyone who's ever paid out £25 for crap and been cheesed off about it." Zero Magazine recommended it as "a no-nonsense megablast" in its January 1992 issue.

Llamatron also received positive reviews for the Atari ST version. Writing for ST News, Richard Karsmakers called the game "brilliant" for its "sheer playability, playing fun and other things that really count. I mean functional graphics that are fun to see, I mean good sonix that fit the game, and I mean oodles and oodles of gameplay." Out of 10, Karsmakers gave Llamatron 7 for graphics, 8.5 for sound, 9 for hookability and playability, and 10 for value, with a concluding remark of "Wonderful! Unbelievable! Playable!". A retroactive review of the Amiga ST version by The Inquirer in March 2007 said that Llamatron "without any question [...] is, was, and will always be a great game." The A–Z of Atari ST Games by Kieren Hawken gave Llamatron 10/10, claiming that "[t]he graphics in Llamatron are great but the biggest props have to go the amazing [sic] digitised sounds [...] [i]t's rare that you will hear sound effects this good in an Atari ST game." In 1996, GamesMaster ranked Llamatron 93rd in their "Top 100 Games of All Time."

By March 1992, Minter had collected 800 registrations, which had earned him £4000. With registrations "still arriving" and the Amiga release "just out", he estimated that he would make £10,000, "not as much as a conventional release, but more than a budget game would generate." His success was seen as unusual in the shareware market and due in large part to the fact that Amiga Computing featured Llamatron as its cover disk. Additionally, Minter was already popular due to Llamasoft's previous games. One critic of the concept, however, noted that "if you compare the response of a few hundred to the tens of thousands of people who have probably played the game, then it works out that quite a low percentage of people have actually sent him money."

== Legacy ==
In 2011, Minter and Llamasoft released a remake of Llamatron for the iPhone and iPad iOS called Minotron: 2112. The game is similar in execution and presentation to Llamatron, although this time the player controls a Minotaur. Andrew Bailey of The Register wrote that Minotron: 2112 "delivers an authentic 8-bit trip down memory lane" and "may feel like a unpolished blast from the past, but it is also, happily, just a blast."
