= Hover Bovver =

1983 video game

- Publisher: Llamasoft
- Designer: Jeff Minter
- Programmers: Jeff Minter (C64); Aaron Liddiment (Atari)
- Platforms: Atari 8-bit, Commodore 64
- Release: 1983: C64; 1984: Atari 8-bit
- Genre: Maze
- Mode: Single-player

Hover Bovver is a 1983 maze video game written by Jeff Minter released for the Commodore 64. A port to Atari 8-bit computers by Aaron Liddiment followed in 1984. Like many of Minter's other games, it has an offbeat sense of humour. The background music is based on the folk tune "Country Gardens" by Percy Grainger, arranged by James Lisney.

== Plot ==
The object of the game is to mow the lawn (using a neighbour's mower) whilst avoiding static obstacles – the flowerbeds – and mobile enemies, including the neighbour himself. The player's pet dog will antagonise the neighbour and keep him away, but as the dog itself is vulnerable to the mower, care must be taken not to run it over.

== Gameplay ==
The lawnmower is controlled with the joystick. Completion of a level requires to mowing every square of grass on the screen. The mower moves slowly at first, but accelerates rapidly if the joystick is held in a single direction, encouraging the player to optimise a route to include as many long, straight lines as possible.

Atari 8-bit gameplay

The player is pursued by "the neighbour", an antagonist who always moves directly towards the player. If caught by the neighbour, the player loses a credit, although this is represented as the neighbour taking the lawnmower away (it being, in fact, the neighbour's property) and the player having to borrow a mower from another neighbour. The player's credit remaining are indicated by the name of the neighbour from whom the current mower has been borrowed: Jim, Tom and finally Alf.

As well as grass, the playing area also includes hedges through which the mower cannot be moved, and flowers. Mowing flowers results in a second antagonist, the gardener, appearing who pursues the player in the same way as the neighbour. Unlike the neighbour, the gardener will not walk over the existing flowerbeds. Moving the mower too fast results in the mower heat gauge rising; if it reaches maximum, the mower will stop moving until the gauge drops back to a particular level. It usually results in the player being caught by the neighbour or gardener.

The player's only helper is their dog. By hitting the fire button, the player can set the dog on the neighbour or gardener. This causes them to run away or freeze in place. The amount of time for which this can be done is limited (displayed as a Dog Loyalty meter). The dog also remains active, roaming randomly on the board even when not being used to attack. A Dog Tolerance meter slowly drops, representing a time limit. Once this reaches zero, the dog begins to attack the mower, causing an immediate overheat if he manages to bite it. If Dog Loyalty remains, the dog can be distracted from attacking the mower by commanding it to attack the neighbour or gardener instead. Also, if the mower collides with the dog, the Dog Tolerance meter immediately drops to zero.

== Legacy ==
=== Windows port ===
In 2002, Idigicon released a Microsoft Windows version under its Kool Dog label. It was not programmed by Jeff Minter. Mower acceleration was removed, and the player has 5 lives instead of 3.

=== Intellivision port ===
In 2018, Elektronite released an Intellivision version. It too was not programmed by Jeff Minter but rather by Óscar Toledo Gutierrez.

=== Sequel ===
In 2002 Minter released a sequel, Hover Bovver 2, for the Windows and PocketPC platforms. This introduced new features:

1. The gardener's speed increases with the number of flowers mowed. If all flowers on the board were mowed, "the police" appear to chase the player – five extremely fast enemies who were immune to the dog.
2. Dog Tolerance drops much more slowly, and crashing into the dog with the mower no longer drops Dog Tolerance to zero. Instead, it causes "the vet" to appear, an enemy behaving as the others but immune to the dog's attacks.
3. The dog occasionally relieves itself on the lawn. The player can prevent this by spending Loyalty. If allowed to proceed, the resulting dog mess slows down the mower, but it also freezes any enemy colliding with it for a long period of time.
4. A "dog toy" can be collected which and thrown to the dog, increasing Loyalty and Tolerance at the cost of the player being unable to use the dog for a period of time.
5. Some levels feature a "weed killer" which if collected, gradually destroys all of the flowers on the level, leading to the gardener and police appearing.
6. Sheep gradually appear to assist in mowing the lawn by eating grass.

=== MAME port ===
In 2022 Llamasoft released a version of Hover Bovver that runs under MAME.
