= Attack of the Mutant Camels =

1983 video game

- Developer: Llamasoft
- Publisher: Llamasoft
- Designer: Jeff Minter
- Platforms: Commodore 64, Atari 8-bit
- Release: 1983
- Genre: Scrolling shooter
- Mode: Single-player

Attack of the Mutant Camels is a surrealist video game written by Jeff Minter and released for the Commodore 64 and Atari 8-bit computers in 1983 by Minter's Llamasoft. The horizontally scrolling shooter is similar to the Atari 2600 game The Empire Strikes Back (1982), with AT-AT walkers replaced by giant camels. The title was also used for the U.S. release of an unrelated game from Minter's Gridrunner series.

Llamasoft released a sequel, Revenge of the Mutant Camels, in 1984.

== Gameplay ==
Atari 8-bit version

The player controls a small jet plane and has the task of killing giant yellow camels before they reach the home base. Doing so requires several dozens of shots. The camels retaliate by shooting fireballs from their mouths. If a camel reaches the base, the game is lost. Once all camels on a level are killed, the player has to survive a "hyperspace" sequence which requires avoiding high-speed missiles. Upon successful completion, the next level presents a new wave of camels, with slightly harder gameplay.

== Reception ==
Commodore User's reviewer said that it was "skilfully-designed" and "excellent for camel/llama freaks and arcade action enthusiasts". Home Computing Weekly complimented the "excellent" sound and graphics, and also praised the clear documentation and instructions; their only criticism was that it was "perhaps a little too difficult!".

== Legacy ==
In 2011, Attack of the Mutant Camels was chosen to be featured in the Smithsonian Institution's "The Art of Video Games" exhibit.

In 2012 the assembly language source code of the Konix version of the game was released on GitHub.
