= Super Ox Wars =

2012 video game

- App logo
- Publisher(s): Llamasoft
- Series: The Minotaur Project
- Platform(s): iOS
- Release: 24 June 2012
- Genre(s): Scrolling shooter
- Mode(s): Single-player

Super Ox Wars is a vertically scrolling shooter for iOS developed by Jeff Minter and Ivan Zorzin of Llamasoft and published via the App Store in 2012. The game is the first vertically scrolling shooter from Llamasoft and is based on such games as Xevious and Star Force. It is the Minotaur Project game representing the Namco Galaga platform. In April 2015 the game became free to play.

The red and blue colours in Super Ox Wars are drawn from the Garantido and Caprichoso teams in the Parintins Folklore Festival which recreates the legend of a resurrected ox.

== Gameplay ==
The player's ship at bottom is left firing blue Caprichoso stars. A Garantido Ox turret waits further up the screen.

The player's ship travels over a vertically scrolling landscape with both ground-based targets and waves of enemy attack ships to shoot. The ship fires constantly (although iCade users can disable this to get an experience more akin to an actual arcade machine). Each level ends with a boss battle which has to be completed before the next level begins.

The colour of the player's ship and bullets, and an indicator display of two oxen, one red, one blue indicate to what extent the player is invested in either Caprichoso (blue) or Garantido (red). Shooting targets or picking up collectables of one colour or the other moves the player further into that polarity and increases the score for that polarity. The total score is an aggregate of Garantido and Caprichoso scores.

A Caprichoso polarized ship will repel enemy bullets while the bullets of a Garantido polarized ship can push enemy shots away. The power of these actions is increased the more deeply the player is in the relevant polarity.

While understanding the subtle changes that the two polarities bring to the game is useful it is also possible to play the game as a straight shooter.

In common with other Llamasoft games Super Ox Wars saves a player's best achievement at the end of each level, allowing them to resume at their previous best score and number of lives (number of lives taking precedence over score). Game Center is used to hold leaderboards and achievements.

== Reception ==
- ArcadeLife rated it 88/100.
- The Smartphone App Review site gave it a score of 92%.
- AppTudes awarded it 4.5 stars out of 5.
- Pocket Gamer rated it 4.5 stars out of 5.
