= Jeff Minter =

British video game designer (born 1962)

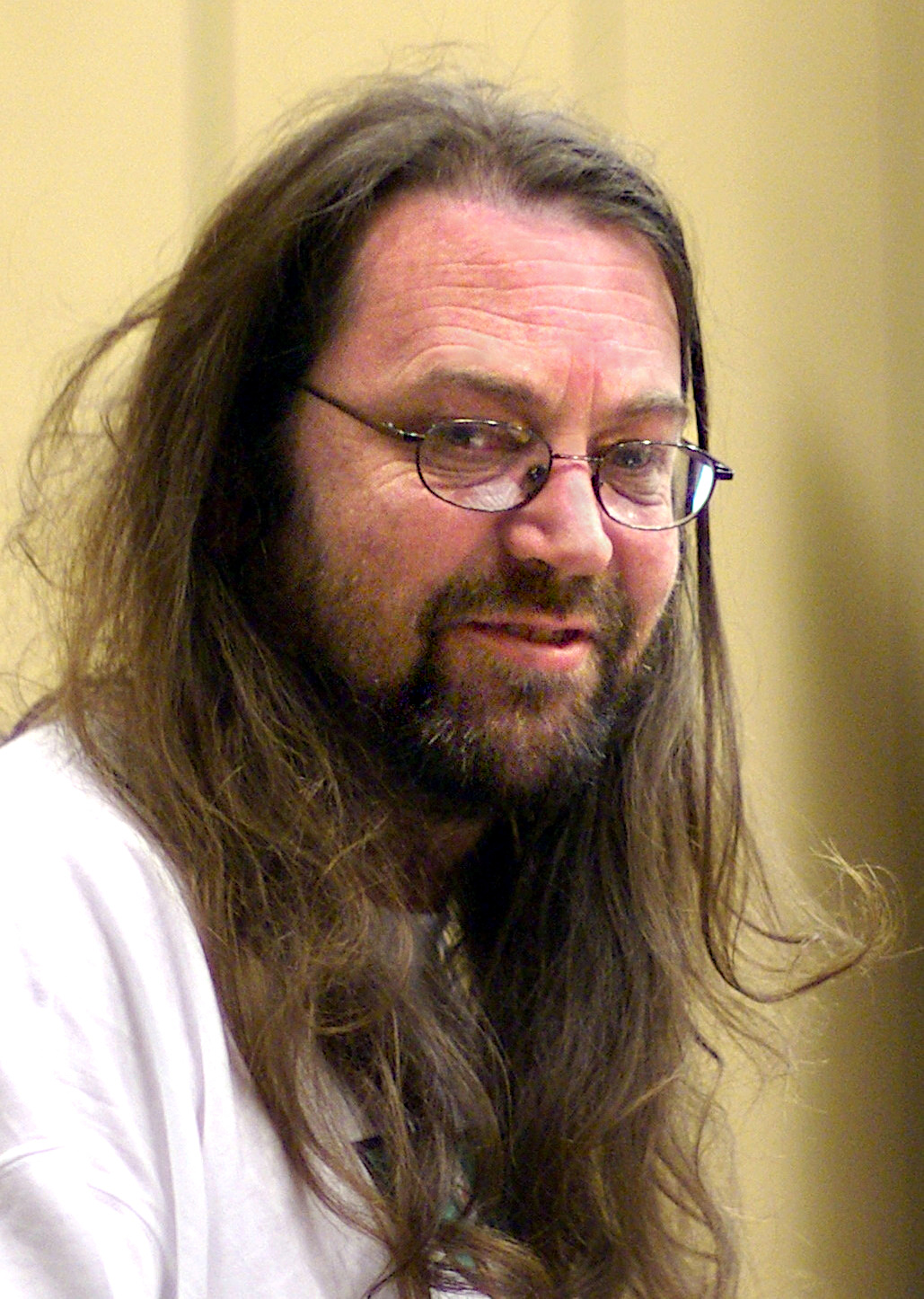
- At the 2007 Game Developers Conference
- Born: 22 April 1962 (age 64); Reading, England
- Other name: Yak
- Occupations: Video game programmer Video game designer
- Employer: Llamasoft (founder)
- Known for: Gridrunner; Attack of the Mutant Camels; Tempest 2000; Polybius
- Website: minotaurproject.co.uk

Jeff Minter (born 22 April 1962) is an English video game designer and programmer who often goes by the nickname Yak. He co-founded independent video game developer Llamasoft in 1982 and was the sole game designer and programmer until Ivan Zorzin started being co-credited in 2008. Minter has created dozens of games, starting in 1981 for the ZX80, then later the ZX Spectrum, VIC-20, Commodore 64, Atari 8-bit computers, Amiga, Atari ST, Jaguar, and other systems. A majority of Minter's projects are shoot 'em ups, often based on games from the golden age of arcade video games such as Defender, Tempest, and Robotron: 2084. Minter has evolved a game design style which combines psychedelic visuals, references to ruminants (especially llamas, sheep, and camels), and quirky audio samples.

Minter's works include Gridrunner (1982) and Tempest 2000 (1994), both of which he has revisited and expanded into new releases multiple times, Attack of the Mutant Camels (1983), and Polybius (2017). He developed a series of music visualization programs, beginning with Psychedelia in 1984 and culminating in Neon, which is built into the Xbox 360 console. In 2011–2013, Minter and Zorzin released nine games for iOS, inspired by 1980s computers and video game consoles, under the banner The Minotaur Project. Many Llamasoft games are self-published, but Minter has also had games released by Human Engineered Software, multiple incarnations of Atari, and other publishers. Many of his games are collected in Llamasoft: The Jeff Minter Story released in 2024 for Windows and consoles.

== Game development career ==
=== Pre-commercial career (early years) ===
Minter began programming computers at a young age. He wrote the game Deflex for the Commodore PET in 1979. However it would not be until a long illness during a university year that Minter's talents would develop in any meaningful way. Following a three-month stint due to a sudden eruption of pericarditis, in which Minter was restricted to lying on his back and was confined to his bed between November 1981 and January 1982, boredom led him to take up computer programming in earnest to pass the time. Upon recovery, Minter teamed up with Richard Jones, a fellow pupil, and together they started writing their own games on their school's PET. They soon parted ways. Jones went on to co-found Interceptor Micros.

=== Commercial 8-bit games ===
In 1981 Minter started independently writing and selling video games for the ZX80, the first machine he owned. Some were made for software company dk'tronics. These titles were sold as a package but this was not available for very long, as Minter left the company following a royalties dispute. He formed a partnership with his mother, Hazel Minter. Together they developed and commercially produced 20 games for the ZX81, VIC-20, Atari 8-bit computers, ZX Spectrum, and Commodore 64. Having been studying physics at the University of East Anglia, success in the programming industry prompted him to drop his studies and take up video game development full-time.

The following year, he founded the software house Llamasoft. His first Llamasoft game was a Defender clone for the VIC-20 called Andes Attack (US version: Aggressor). In Andes Attack, the player had to protect llamas instead of the humanoids from Defender. As a fan of Defender, Minter would remake it again as Defender 2000. Through the Brighton-based software house, Salamander Software, Minter had his games written for the Spectrum and other home microcomputers. It was Mr S.A. Tenquist who was responsible for the ZX Spectrum 16K version of Gridrunner. The conversion was released and published for Christmas 1983 by Quicksilva Ltd., UK. Jeff Minter's original Commodore version was written in a week and marked his first commercial success both in the UK and in the US.

Minter went on to develop a number of games for the Commodore 64, Atari 8-bit computers, and Atari ST which were marketed by word of mouth and magazine advertisements. These included Gridrunner, Abductor, Matrix: Gridrunner 2, Hellgate, Hover Bovver, Attack of the Mutant Camels, Revenge of the Mutant Camels, Return of the Mutant Camels, Laser Zone, Mama Llama, Metagalactic Llamas Battle at the Edge of Time, Sheep in Space, Voidrunner, and Iridis Alpha.

=== Post 8-bit work ===
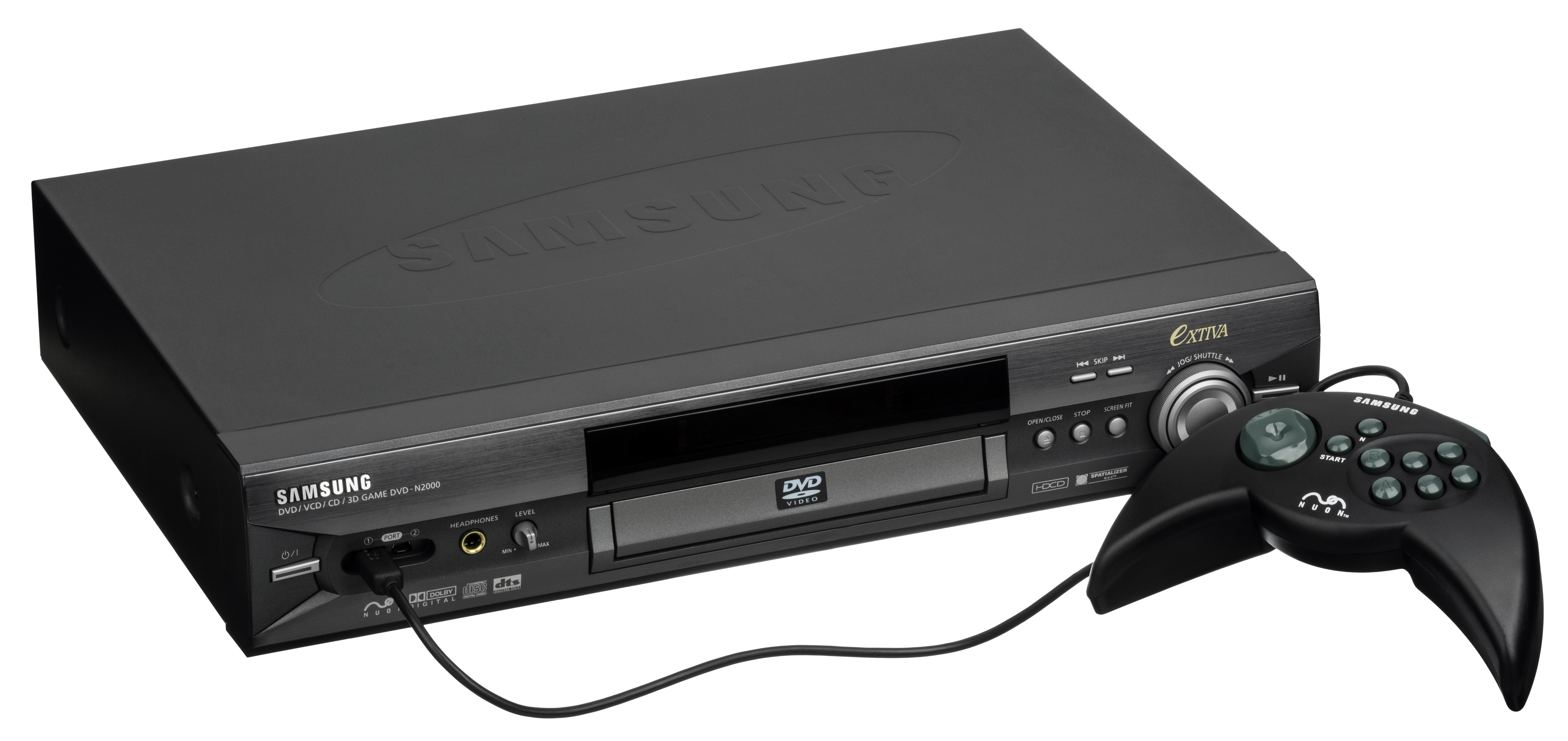
Minter developed Tempest 3000 and the second Virtual Light Machine for the Nuon game system.

In 1989, Minter helped in the production of the Konix Multisystem console.

Minter worked for Atari Corporation and VM Labs. For Atari he produced Tempest 2000 (1994) on the Jaguar. It was a remake of Dave Theurer's 1981 Tempest. He followed it with Defender 2000 (1995) on the Jaguar, a remake of the 1981 arcade game. Listing Minter in their "75 Most Important People in the Games Industry of 1995", Next Generation called him the Jaguar's "leading developer". Minter also produced the Virtual Light Machine (VLM-1) for the Jaguar CD add-on. For VM Labs he created the VLM-2 and Tempest 3000.

Minter then wrote games for the Pocket PC platform, some of which also have Windows conversions: Deflex, Hover Bovver 2: Grand Theft Flymo (a reinterpretation of his own 1984 game, Hover Bovver), and Gridrunner++.

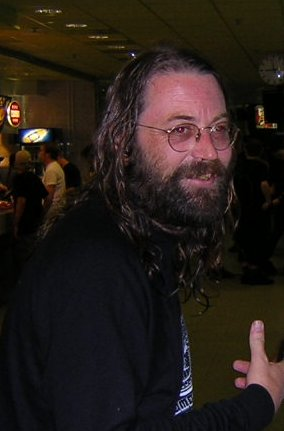
Jeff Minter at Assembly 2004

In 2002, he began work on a music video game for the GameCube to be called Unity. Using the newest version of his VLM, the VLM-3 or Neon, Unity was to combine the two main threads of Minter's prior career: light synthesis and classic arcade style shooting. Minter was involved in writing this game for Lionhead Studios throughout 2003. The project was cancelled in December 2004. Neon has since been reprogrammed and significantly expanded and is used in Xbox 360 media visualisation.

In 2007 Minter released Space Giraffe, an action video game with similarities to Tempest. Space Giraffe was released for Xbox 360 through Xbox Live Arcade.

In 2008 it was announced at the Tokyo Game Show that designers at Llamasoft were working on the visualisation aspects of the Xbox 360 version of Space Invaders Extreme. The game was released in 2008. In December 2008 Space Giraffe was released for Windows.

In September 2009 he released Gridrunner Revolution for Windows as a digital download.

=== The Minotaur Project ===
In 2010, frustrated with the delays surrounding the release of his titles, Minter was keen to return to a style of game development where games could be produced and released quickly. The iOS platform was chosen and Llamasoft announced that a series of games would be produced under the banner The Minotaur Project. The idea behind the series is that Llamasoft would develop a game in the style of a past computer or console but without the constraints of the original hardware.

On 5 January 2011 he released Minotaur Rescue for iPhone 3GS, iPhone 4, iPod Touch (3rd generation), iPod Touch (4th generation), and iPad.

On 2 March 2011 Llamasoft released their second iOS game, Minotron: 2112. Minotron: 2112 is a remake of the Atari ST / Amiga game Llamatron (which was inspired by the coin-op video game Robotron: 2084). An iOS version of Deflex was also released although this was not specifically labeled as being part of the Minotaur Project.

On 17 September 2011, Llamasoft released GoatUp, their first platform game.

On 27 January 2012 Caverns of Minos was released followed on 24 March by Gridrunner iOS.

Super Ox Wars, a shoot-em-up based on Ikaruga, was released in July 2012; the final game in the series, GoatUp 2 was released in March 2013, unique in that it is the only Llamasoft title to feature a level editor.

Minter then announced his intention to abandon mobile development due to lack of discoverability, low turnover, and the dominance of free-to-play and video game clones; he ultimately declared that, after accounting for his time, the Minotaur Project made a net loss. Minter stated on Twitter than "Returning to iOS would be like returning to the scene of a mugging" and "I would advise any dev valuing integrity and sanity to just get the hell out". As a result, the Minotaur Project games were not updated for 64-bit versions of iOS and were removed from the App Store while existing copies became unplayable on updated devices.

The code framework for the Minotaur Project games enables them to be rebuilt for both Mac and PC versions. Gridrunner was released for the Mac in August 2012.

=== Return to console games ===
In April 2013 it was announced that Llamasoft had signed a deal with Sony Computer Entertainment to create a tube shooter for the PlayStation Vita called TxK. The game would be Llamasoft's fourth tube shooter in two decades and was described as the spiritual successor of 1994's Tempest 2000 for the Atari Jaguar. As Minter explained in his development blog the project goals were to create a more traditional, straightforward and accessible tube shooter than Space Giraffe, to improve on the flaws from Tempest 2000 and Tempest 3000, and to evoke the neo-retro aesthetic without being cheesy. TxK was released on 11 February 2014, by digital download through PSN.

At the beginning of 2015, Minter was threatened with legal action by Atari, claiming that TxK was too similar to Tempest 2000 - a game that Minter himself wrote, but Atari owned the rights to. This raised several issues, including Atari claiming that Minter that had illegally copied material from his own source code and violated design copyrights on his own design traditions. Sony was unwilling to support Minter and as such future versions of TxK were blocked from release, although the PS Vita version remains available.

Minter and Zorzin's first publicly available game for a modern home console, Polybius, was released on the PlayStation 4 on 9 May 2017. The game features extensive support for the PlayStation VR headset, based on Minter's experience building the unreleased VR version of TxK. Shortly after release, Llamasoft were contacted by Trent Reznor of the band Nine Inch Nails, asking to use visuals from Polybius as the basis for the music video for the song "Less Than"; the video was released on 13 July the same year.

In August 2017, Atari, SA issued a press release, announcing a partnership with Llamasoft to develop Tempest 4000 on the PlayStation 4 and Xbox One video game consoles and Windows-based personal computers. It was released in July 2018.

In March 2018, Minter announced that the framework for the Minotaur Project had also been ported to the PlayStation 4 and stated an intention to release enhanced versions of the Minotaur Project games as console games in bundles under the name Minotaur Arcade. In December 2018, Llamasoft released Minotaur Arcade Volume 1 on Steam. This contained much enhanced versions of GoatUp and Gridrunner with support for playing on the Oculus Rift but also playable in 2D. A PlayStation 4 version of Minotaur Arcade Volume 1 was released in October 2019.

Minter revisited the enhanced Minotaur Arcade framework to produce an original game, Moose Life, released on Steam in August 2020 and on PlayStation 4 in February 2021.

In December 2022, Minter announced that he had been contracted to produce a complete and up-to-date version of Atari's abandoned 1982 prototype arcade machine Akka Arrh, the original version of which had become available to the wider public as part of the recently published collection Atari 50: The Anniversary Celebration. In 2023, Digital Eclipse announced that they would be compiling 42 of Minter's games and releasing them as Llamasoft: The Jeff Minter Story, the second entry in their Gold Master Series.

== Other appearances ==
Minter appeared in the interactive film Black Mirror: Bandersnatch, released in December 2018. The film is based around the 1980s video game industry in the United Kingdom; Minter played Jerome F. Davies, the author of the titular Bandersnatch novel, who murdered his wife.

Minter also contributed to the documentary film From Bedrooms to Billions.

Minter appears extremely briefly as a background character in Ashens and the Polybius Heist.

== Personal life ==
In online forums and informal game credits pages Minter usually signs as "Yak", which is, in his own words

a pseudonym chosen a long time ago, back in the days when high score tables on coin-op machines only held three letters, and I settled on Yak because the yak is a scruffy hairy beast – a lot like me;-).

Since 2015, Minter has used the name "Yak" relatively rarely, usually signing as "Stinky Ox" or "Jeff Minotaur".

He lives in Wales with his partner Ivan "Giles" Zorzin, four sheep, two goats, two llamas and a dog. Although Minter is synonymous with Llamasoft, Zorzin is jointly responsible for the recent titles.

Minter likes Indian food, particularly chicken vindaloo. Sheep are his favourite animal; he has kept them as pets for many years.

== Games ==
=== Second- and third generation games ===
- Deflex (VIC-20, Commodore PET)
- Centipede (ZX81, 1982)
- 3D Labyrinth (VIC-20, 1982)
- Abductor (VIC-20, 1982)
- Andes Attack (VIC-20, 1982) a.k.a. Defenda
- Bomb Buenos Aires (VIC-20, 1982; Atari ST, 1988) a.k.a. Aggressor, Bomber, Blitzkrieg
- City Bomber (ZX Spectrum, 1982)
- Gridrunner (VIC-20, Atari 8-bit, ZX Spectrum, 1982; C64, 1983)
- Matrix: Gridrunner 2 (VIC-20, 1982; Atari 8-bit and C64, 1983; C16, 1986)
- Rat Man (VIC-20, 1982)
- Rox III (VIC-20/ZX Spectrum, 1982)
- Super Deflex (ZX Spectrum, 1982)
- Turboflex (Atari 8-bit, 1982)
- Attack of the Mutant Camels (Atari 8-bit and C64, 1983) a.k.a. Advance of the Megacamel
- Headbangers Heaven (ZX Spectrum, 1983)
- Hover Bovver (C64, 1983; Atari 8-bit, 1984; Galaxians/Scramble hardware, 2022)
- Laser Zone (VIC-20/C64, 1983; C16, 1986)
- Metagalactic Llamas Battle at the Edge of Time (VIC-20, 1983; C64, 1984) a.k.a. Meta-Llamas
- Revenge of the Mutant Camels (C64, 1984)
- Rox 64 (C64, 1983)
- Traxx (VIC-20/ZX Spectrum, 1983)
- Ancipital (C64, 1984)
- Hellgate (VIC-20/C64, 1984)
- Psychedelia (VIC-20/ZX Spectrum/C64/MSX, 1984), light synthesizer.
- Sheep in Space (C64, 1984)
- Batalyx (C64, 1985)
- Colourspace (Atari 8-bit, 1985), light synthesizer.
- Mama Llama (C64, 1985)
- Yak's Progress (C64, 1985) - compilation of eight previously released titles.
- Iridis Alpha (C64, 1986)
- Made in France II (C64, 1987)
- Return of the Mutant Camels (C64, 1987; Atari 8-bit, 1988) a.k.a. Revenge of the Mutant Camels 2
- Voidrunner (C64/MSX, 1987)

=== Fourth generation games ===
- Trip-a-Tron (Amiga/Atari ST, 1988)
- Super Gridrunner (Amiga, 1989; Atari ST, 1991)
- Defender II (Amiga/Atari ST, 1990)
- Photon Storm (Amiga/Atari ST, 1990)
- Llamatron: 2112 (Amiga/Atari ST, 1991; PC, 1992)
- Revenge of the Mutant Camels (Amiga/Atari ST, 1991; PC, 1994) enhanced re-release
- Hardcore (Atari ST, 1992)

=== Fifth generation games ===
- Tempest 2000 (Atari Jaguar, 1994)
- Virtual Light Machine (Atari Jaguar, 1994) a.k.a. VLM-1
- Defender 2000 (Atari Jaguar, 1995)
- Llamazap (Atari Falcon, 1995)
- Tempest 3000 (Nuon DVD, 2000)
- VLM-2 (Nuon DVD, 2000)
- Gridrunner++ (PC, 2002)
- Hover Bovver 2: Grand Theft Flymo (PC, 2002)

=== Sixth generation games ===
- Unity (GCN, Cancelled)

=== Seventh generation games ===
- Neon (Xbox 360, 2005) a.k.a. VLM-3
- Space Giraffe (Xbox 360, 2007; PC, 2008)
- Space Invaders Extreme (Xbox 360, 2009)
- Gridrunner Revolution (PC, 2009)

=== The Minotaur Project ===
- Minotaur Rescue, (2011) Represents the Atari 2600.
- Minotron: 2112, (2011) Represents the Mattel Intellivision.
- GoatUp, (2011) Represents the ZX Spectrum.
- Caverns of Minos, (2012) Represents the Atari 8-bit computers.
- Gridrunner iOS, Represents arcade games of Namco System 86 era. First Minotaur Project title to be released on the Mac.
- Five A Day
- Super Ox Wars, Represents the Namco Galaga platform. Llamasoft's first vertical scrolling shooter.
- Deflex, Puzzle game and a remake of one of Llamasoft's earliest titles.
- GoatUp 2, Sequel to GoatUp. Platform game with level editor built-in.

=== Eighth generation games ===
- TxK (PlayStation Vita, 2014)
- Minotaur Rescue VR (Oculus Rift, Windows, 2014)
- Polybius (PS4, PlayStation VR, PC, Oculus Rift, 2016)
- Tempest 4000 (PC, PS4, Nintendo Switch, Xbox One, Atari VCS 800)
- Minotaur Arcade Vol. 1 (combines voxel-based remakes of Gridrunner iOS and GoatUp) (PC, PS4)
- Moose Life (PC, PS4)
- Akka Arrh (PC, PS4, PS5, Nintendo Switch, Xbox One

=== Ninth generation games ===
- I, Robot (PC, PS5, PS4, Nintendo Switch, Xbox Series X, Xbox Series S, Xbox One, Atari VCS 800, 2025)
