= Tempest 2000 =

1994 video game

- Original Atari Jaguar cover art in all regions
- Developer: Llamasoft: Imagitec Design (DOS) High Voltage Software (PS1/SAT) Logicware (Mac)
- Publishers: Atari Corporation: Jaguar; NA/EU: Atari Corporation; JP: Mumin Corporation MS-DOS; NA/EU: Atari Interactive Saturn; NA/EU: Interplay Productions PlayStation; NA/EU: Interplay Productions Macintosh; NA: Logicware
- Producer: John Skruch
- Designer: Jeff Minter
- Programmer: Jeff Minter
- Artist: Joby Wood
- Writer: Joe Sousa
- Composers: Alastair Lindsay; Ian Howe; Kevin Saville
- Series: Tempest
- Platform: Atari Jaguar: Macintosh, Microsoft Windows, MS-DOS, PlayStation, Sega Saturn
- Release: 13 April 1994: Jaguar; NA: 13 April 1994; EU: 27 June 1994; JP: 15 December 1994 MS-DOS; NA/EU: 31 October 1996 PlayStation; NA: 29 November 1996; EU: 1 February 1997 Saturn; NA: 20 December 1996; EU: 20 March 1997 Macintosh; NA: 1998
- Genre: Tube shooter
- Modes: Single-player, multiplayer

Tempest 2000 (Note: Japanese: テンペスト 2000, Hepburn: Tenpesuto 2000) is a 1994 tube shooter video game originally developed by Llamasoft and published by Atari Corporation for the Atari Jaguar. Part of Atari Corp.'s 2000 series, it is a remake of the 1981 arcade game Tempest.

Taking control of the claw-shaped Blaster spacecraft from the original game, the player must survive and travel across multiple levels until the end of an intergalactic war, battling against a variety of enemies that appear on the playfield. Designed by Jeff Minter, it is a remake of Dave Theurer's Tempest, which used Atari's QuadraScan vector color display technology. Initially an exclusive for the Jaguar, Tempest 2000 was ported following Jaguar's discontinuation to other platforms: MS-DOS, Macintosh, Sega Saturn, PlayStation (as Tempest X3) and Windows, each with several changes and additions from the original.

Tempest 2000 was critically acclaimed when it was released on the Jaguar, with critics praising the graphics, gameplay and soundtrack. It has often been called one of the best games released for the Jaguar and as of 1 April 1995, the Jaguar version has sold more than 30,000 copies during its lifetime, making it one of the best-selling games for the system. Critical reception to the various ports, though still mostly positive, was more mixed than reception for the original version, owing to the aging of the game and differing opinions of the enhancements the ports offered.

== Gameplay ==
Gameplay screenshot of the Jaguar version showcasing web level 4. At the top right of the corner, the player has obtained two Warp Bonus tokens.

Tempest 2000 modifies the gameplay of the original Tempest by adding power-ups, bonus levels, more sophisticated enemy types and wildly varying web level designs. The game features a total of 100 web levels, with new frame colors and variations after every 16 levels completed. In all versions, progress is automatically saved after completing a couple of levels and players are allowed to resume by using "Keys" to return to the last stage where the game was saved. There are also three gameplay modes in addition to the main game. Completing all 100 web levels in Tempest 2000 unlocks "Beastly Mode", which is a harder difficulty setting where enemies move faster, fire more often and are more resilient to the player's shots. In addition, the player's ship fires at a lower rate than in the original difficulty.

The main objective of the game is to survive and score points for as long as possible by clearing the playfield on the screen from enemies that appear at the bottom of the web. The player's ship has rapid-fire capacity to quickly shoot down enemies within the same segment the player is positioned at. The ship is also equipped with a Superzapper smart bomb that destroys all current enemies on the playfield, while recharging the Superzapper and using it a second time destroys a random enemy on-screen.

New to Tempest 2000 are power-ups, which appear as capsule-shaped polygon objects after destroying a number of enemies or enemy bullets. Catching the power-up will activate one of a number of progressively more useful capabilities such as the Particle Laser, which enhances the ship's firepower and allows much faster destruction of enemies and spikes left by Spike Layers. Jump lets the player jump off the web to avoid enemy fire and enemies that travel along the edge of the playfield such as the Fuseball and electrified attacks from the Pulsars. The A.I. Droid is an autonomous vectorial ship that appears floating above the web and shoots at the enemies. In addition, grabbing a power-up while warping into a new level will play an increasingly high-pitched sound of a woman screaming "Yes! Yes! Yes!" and after arriving to the next level, the first power-up that the player will receive is the A.I. Droid.

Also new to the game are Warp Bonus tokens, which allow the player access into any of the three types of bonus stages after collecting three tokens and completing the level. Completing the bonus level grants 25,000 points and the player skips five levels ahead, but failing will warp the player to just one level. Outta Here! is a power-up that appears randomly and collecting it will destroy all enemies on-screen and warps the player into the next level. However, spikes left by Spike Layers will not be eliminated, so it is possible to lose a life by hitting one as the ship warps down the web. Between certain power-ups, players can also gain 2,000 point bonuses as well.

Other modes include Traditional Tempest, which is a recreation of the original arcade game; Tempest Plus, which is a mix between Traditional and Tempest 2000 modes and Tempest Duel, a two-player versus mode where players compete in a series of matches against each other. In addition, this mode includes an exclusive Mirror power-up, which deflects shots from the rival back at him, alongside other objects to use in the playfield and regular enemies from the main game.

== Development ==
At a gaming convention, Atari held a conference with prospective developers for the Atari Jaguar where they listed off arcade games that they were considering having converted to the Jaguar, asking them to raise their hands at ones they wanted to work on. Jeff Minter volunteered to do Tempest as it was one of his favorite games. At the launch party for the Jaguar in New York, the creator of the Atari Jaguar took Minter aside and told him that he felt Tempest 2000 was a poor demonstration of the Jaguar's capabilities. Though discouraged, Minter continued to work on the game until it was finished and also regarded the Jaguar hardware as easy to develop for. Tempest 2000 was developed in Wales. Carrie Tahquechi, wife of ex-Atari producer Ted Tahquechi did the female voice work in Tempest 2000.

The most common criticism with the Jaguar version of Tempest 2000 was the lack of a rotary controller similar to the controller on the Tempest arcade machine. In fact, the game was programmed with an option to use just such a controller, even though Atari never released one. Such a controller was planned for development and release by Atari, but no prototypes exist. However, several homebrew options exist by using parts from a Jaguar controller and either an Atari 2600 Driving Controller or new, higher-precision rotary encoders. The one used by Jeff Minter during testing was made from a hacked-up 2600 driving controller.

== Audio ==
Tempest 2000 The Soundtrack

Soundtrack album by Ian Howe, Alastair Lindsay, Kevin Saville and Julian Hodgson
- Released: 1994
- Recorded: 1994
- Studio: Imagitec Design
- Genres: Video game music, Breakbeat Hardcore
- Length: 61:25
- Language: English
- Label: Atari
- Producer: John Skruch

The original Atari Jaguar version's music was created by Ian Howe, Alastair Lindsay and Kevin Saville of Imagitec Design (a.k.a. Dream Weavers), who also created the music for Jeff Minter's Defender 2000 on the Jaguar as well.

The music was composed in the Commodore Amiga MOD file format, although non-Jaguar releases of the game played music from a CD. At the time of its release, the music soundtrack could also be purchased on CD directly from Atari. The CD was also bundled with the short-lived Atari Jaguar CD to demonstrate the system's Virtual Light Machine music visualizer. It became the basis for the audio for all conversions of the game to come including the PC, PlayStation and Saturn versions. Several tracks, however, were not used in the Jaguar version due to cartridge space constraints.

Track list
No.	Title	Length
1.	"Thermal Resolution" (Unused in the Jaguar version)	3:59
2.	"Mind's Eye"	4:52
3.	"T2K" (Unused in the Jaguar version)	5:23
4.	"Ease Yourself" (Unused in the Jaguar version)	7:52
5.	"Tracking Depth" (Unused in the Jaguar version)	5:04
6.	"Constructive Demolition"	4:05
7.	"Future Tense" (Unused in the Jaguar version)	5:54
8.	"Digital Terror"	5:07
9.	"Hyper Prism" (Unused in the Jaguar version)	4:26
10.	"Glide Control"	5:12
11.	"Ultra Yak"	4:00
12.	"2000 Dub"	7:31

== Release and versions ==
Tempest 2000 was originally released for the Atari Jaguar in 1994 in all regions including Japan, where it was published by Mumin Corporation and came with an exclusive Japanese manual for the region. The game was ported to MS-DOS, Macintosh, Sega Saturn and PlayStation, the latter version with several changes to the design under the name of Tempest X3. The Jaguar version was included as part of the Atari 50: The Anniversary Celebration compilation for Nintendo Switch, PlayStation 4, Steam, and Xbox One, marking the game's first re-release.

=== PCs ===
The MS-DOS version, programmed by Imagitec Design, contains optional AdLib and Roland MT-32 versions of the music, but lacks several of the visual effects of the console versions, such as the "Melt-O-Vision" transition effects. The Windows version is rendered in higher resolution, and has some unique glitches, like registering bonus level scores incorrectly. The Macintosh version was developed and published by Logicware in 1998.

=== Tempest X3 ===
Tempest X3, the Sony PlayStation version, was released in 1996, with updated graphics and sound, although the following gameplay differences from the original version were identified by Jeff Minter in a Usenet post:

- The "AI Droid" only follows the player, instead of acting autonomously. A new, "Mega Droid" powerup rectifies this somewhat, but it takes a very long time within a level to acquire it.
- Pulsars now move slowly around the top of the Web if they reach it (rather than electrifying the whole top edge the moment they arrive).
- The Particle Laser is no more effective than the normal laser against Spikes (in the original, it destroys them very quickly).
- Some of the harder, "sticking point" webs have been removed from the game entirely.

Entering the name "YIFF!" or "H_V_S" on the top highscore position activates a secret mode, allowing the user to play the original Tempest 2000 game. Any high scores made in this mode are not saved, the music (wave-captured from the original modules) is muffled and the effectiveness of the Particle Laser against spikes is not restored.

The PlayStation version of Tempest X3 supports the PlayStation Mouse, Nyko Trackball and Namco's rotary neGcon analog controller.

=== Saturn ===
The Saturn version, programmed by High Voltage Software, is close to the original Jaguar version, except for the removal of the third type of bonus level. It uses most of the audio tracks from the Tempest 2000 soundtrack CD for gameplay. The speech samples were redone.

== Reception ==
Reception

Review scores
Publication	Score			
Publication	Atari Jaguar	PC	PS	Saturn
AllGame	4.5/5	4.5/5	3.5/5	4/5
Computer and Video Games	84 / 100	N/A	5 / 5	3 / 5
Edge	9 / 10	N/A	N/A	N/A
Electronic Gaming Monthly	10/10, 9/10, 7/10, 8/10	N/A	7/10, 4/10, 6/10, 5/10	N/A
GameFan	98%, 96%, 98%, 96%	N/A	88/100, 97/100, 95/100	N/A
GameSpot	N/A	N/A	3.5 / 10	N/A
Next Generation	4/5	N/A	4/5	N/A
EP	N/A	N/A	N/A	9.5 / 10
Electronic Games	B	N/A	N/A	N/A
Entertainment Weekly	A−	N/A	N/A	N/A
GamesMaster	97 / 100	N/A	N/A	83 / 100
Macworld	N/A	5/5	N/A	N/A
Mean Machines Sega	N/A	N/A	N/A	88 / 100
Sega Saturn Magazine	N/A	N/A	N/A	80%
ST Format	97%	N/A	N/A	N/A

Awards
Publication	Award
EGM (1994)	Game of the Month, Game of the Year (Jaguar)
GameFan (1994)	Best Arcade (Jaguar)
Game Informer (2001)	#56 Top 100 Games of All Time
VideoGames (1994)	Best Shooter, Best Music (Cartridge)

Tempest 2000 received general critical acclaim when released for the Jaguar. GamePro praised the graphics and high speed, said the music included "the best techno-rave tracks anywhere", and deemed the two-player competitive mode "well worth the price of the cart." Electronic Gaming Monthly gave it their "Game of the Month" award, citing the "superb" techno soundtrack and "graphics that surpass the arcade version". GameFan also gave the Jaguar version a positive review. In a 1995 overview of Atari's history, Next Generation said of Tempest 2000 that "This single game probably did more for Atari's reputation than anything the company's marketing team had managed in the last five years." Tempest 2000 sold more than 30,000 copies, making it the second best-selling game on the platform behind Alien vs Predator, though it is unknown how many were sold in total during its lifetime as of 1 April 1995.

The PlayStation version was much less well received. Jeff Gerstmann of GameSpot and Scary Larry of GamePro both said that it offers too few enhancements or additions over the by-then more than two years old Jaguar version. Dan Hsu and Crispin Boyer of Electronic Gaming Monthly questioned why the Jaguar game had received such acclaim in the first place, opining it was simply an outdated arcade game with some extra "glitter" which has no bearing on the essence of the game, and that the PlayStation version was essentially the same. Sushi-X felt that it paled against the Jaguar version, lacking the smoothness of the original release. Gerstmann, Hsu, Boyer, and Sushi-X also complained that the game suffers from poor control in the absence of a rotary controller like the original Tempest's. However, a Next Generation critic gave it a positive review, opining it retained the elements which made the Jaguar version great and that the enhancements were strong enough to make it fresh.

Reviewing the Saturn version, Paul Glancey of Sega Saturn Magazine recalled the impact of the game's original release on the Jaguar: "... Jeff Minter had pepped up the gameplay with a barrage of eye-warping pixel explosions, swirling, smearing colour effects and a 'banging' ravey soundtrack. ... Turn down the lights, turn up the colour, run the sound through your hi-fi then jam up the bass and the volume and you could enjoy a gaming experience so hypnotic as to be almost mind-altering." He concluded that the Saturn port, though slightly inferior to the Jaguar original, effectively recreated this experience for Saturn owners.

Entertainment Weekly gave the game an A− and wrote that "An update of the arcade shooting classic, Tempest 2000 is multimedia in the truest sense, with psychedelic graphics, a CD-quality soundtrack, breathy voice samples (the words superzapper recharge have never sounded more erotic), even text that scrolls past at dizzying speeds. The one weakness is the often-unresponsive Jaguar control pad."

In 1996, GamesMaster ranked the game 17th on their "Top 100 Games of All Time." Tempest 2000 was also awarded Best Jaguar Game of 1994 by Electronic Gaming Monthly.

== Legacy ==
In 1996, the game's Melt-O-Vision trademark was abandoned, while the trademark renewal for the title was also cancelled in 2006. It was cited by Ultra/United Games as an influence during development of Battle-Girl. VM Labs licensed Tempest for their Nuon DVD system and hired Jeff Minter to produce a sequel, Tempest 3000. Minter also produced the unofficial "inspired by" follow-ups Space Giraffe and TxK on the Sony PlayStation Vita. On 24 August 2008, the source code of Tempest 2000 was released by the defunct Jaguar Sector II website under a CD compilation for PC titled Jaguar Source Code Collection. Also, two unofficial clones of Tempest 2000 named Typhoon 2001 and Cyclone 2000 were launched for PC and Android devices, by Thorsten Kuphaldt and NoCrew Mobile respectively. Another sequel, Tempest 4000, was released in July 2018. The title was a reworking of an earlier clone by Minter titled TxK, that incorporates classic Tempest 2000 music and enemies, alongside other enhancements.
