= Sheep in Space =

1984 video game

- Title screen
- Developer(s): Llamasoft
- Publisher(s): NA: Llamasoft; EU: Llamasoft
- Programmer(s): Jeff Minter
- Platform(s): Commodore 64
- Release: NA: 1984; EU: 1984
- Genre(s): Scrolling shooter
- Mode(s): Single-player, multiplayer

Sheep in Space is a video game written by Jeff Minter for the Commodore 64 and published in 1984 by Llamasoft. It is a horizontally scrolling shooter which borrows gameplay from Defender re-themed to involve sheep. The title screen features an arrangement of Bach's "Sheep May Safely Graze" by pianist James Lisney.

== Gameplay ==
The player controls a small flying sheep and has the task of defending the planet by shooting down aliens, and preventing them from charging up their "planet buster" gun.

Like Llamasoft's 1984 release Ancipital, the game makes use of multiple gravitational fields - there is a landscape across the bottom of the screen as per a normal shoot 'em up, but also an inverted one across the top. If the player is in the centre of the screen, the projectiles the sheep fires fly straight. Getting closer to the land at the top or the bottom of the screen will cause the projectiles to curve up or down respectively, allowing the shooting of aliens close to the surface. Proximity to the upper and lower surfaces also affects movement speed which becomes slower when near either surface.

The player can land the sheep on areas of grass on either the top or bottom of the screen, in order to reduce its hunger. A stomach meter shows the player's current state of hunger - overfeeding or allowing the sheep to starve will result in the loss of a life. Feeding also replenishes the sheep's shields.

Destroying all of the aliens advances the player to the next level, which has different topography and is slightly more difficult. There are 48 levels in total.

== Influenced games and clones ==
Just as Sheep in Space was influenced by Defender, it in turn inspired the Sensible Software title Insects in Space.
