= Gridrunner =

1982 video game

- Developer: Jeff Minter
- Publishers: HESware; Quicksilva (Spectrum); Salamander (Dragon)
- Platforms: VIC-20, Atari 8-bit, Commodore 64, ZX Spectrum, Dragon 32; Remakes; Atari ST, Amiga, Pocket PC, Windows, iOS, Android
- Release: 1982
- Genre: Fixed shooter

Gridrunner is a fixed shooter video game written by Jeff Minter and published by Llamasoft for the VIC-20 in 1982. It was ported to the Atari 8-bit computers, ZX Spectrum, Commodore 64, Commodore PET and Dragon 32. Many remakes and sequels have followed, including versions for the Atari ST, Amiga, Pocket PC, Microsoft Windows, and iOS.

== Gameplay ==
The game is similar to the Atari, Inc. arcade game Centipede, with long, segmented enemies that progress in a zig-zag fashion and can be broken apart. Players control a small ship that can fire upwards and move freely around the screen. The player must also avoid pulses emitted by the X-Y zappers which patrol the edges of the grid. The game has twenty waves of enemies to complete.

== Development ==
Llamasoft released Gridrunner in 1982 for the unexpanded VIC-20. The game was written over the course of a single week. Although it draws its inspiration from the arcade game Centipede with the concept of a snake-like enemy descending the screen through a series of obstacles (mushrooms in Centipede, pods in Gridrunner) it plays much faster. Versions of the game appeared for several of the home computers of the early 1980s.

The name of the game was inspired by posters advertising the film Blade Runner.

== Reception ==
In April 1983, the game topped the US computer game sales chart. In 1984, The Commodore 64 Home Companion advised to "forget the plot; fast action is the name of this game".

== Legacy ==
In 1983, Minter released Matrix: Gridrunner 2, which retained much of the original's gameplay, but introduced new enemy types and a scrolling background. It was first published on the Commodore 64, and ported to other platforms. This title was released in the US as Attack of the Mutant Camels, a title taken from an unrelated Llamasoft title released in the UK. A second sequel, Voidrunner, followed in 1987, which abandons the grid backgrounds, and features more colorful and elaborate graphics.

In 1991, Llamasoft released Super Gridrunner for the Atari ST. The first 32-bit title in the series, it added power-ups to the series for the first time, while retaining the basic elements of a single-screen shooter. This would be the last entry in the series for over a decade, during which time Jeff partnered with Atari on updates to the Tempest and Defender series.

Gridrunner was revived in 2002 with Gridrunner++, a shareware downloadable title released on Llamasoft's website. Featuring retro sprite-based visuals and faster-paced gameplay on a scrolling field, it proved popular with fans. A sequel followed in 2009. Originally developed under the working title Gridrunner+++ it was released on Windows PCs as Gridrunner Revolution, after a newly introduced rotation mechanic. This version also made heavy use of Minter's "light synth" tech, with colorful, psychedelic visuals. It is also the only title in the series with a full musical soundtrack.

=== Later versions ===
In 2012, Llamasoft released a reimagined version for iOS, simply titled Gridrunner. This version pared the game back to a style reminiscent of early 1980s arcade games. Eurogamer called it "the best shooter on iOS", and Touch Arcade described it as "a retro remake done right". It was later ported to Android as shareware.

In 2018, Llamasoft released Minotaur Arcade Vol. 1 on PC and PS4. This compilation release features a new iteration of Gridrunner and GoatUp, using 3D voxel-based graphics. Like the iOS version before it, this version is simply titled Gridrunner and features a retro-arcade aesthetic, but unlike its predecessor, it features changing 3D perspectives, new enemy types, and new power-ups.

A reimagined version of the game is included in Digital Eclipse's Llamasoft: The Jeff Minter Story.
