= Monopoly (disambiguation) =

A monopoly is a situation in which there is only one provider of a specific good or service.

Monopoly may also refer to:

== Games ==
- Monopoly (game), a property trading board game
  - Monopoly money, a term for the in-game currency
  - Monopoly (game show), an American TV series
  - Monopoly video games, several adaptations
  - Monopoly (play-by-mail game)

=== Video games ===
- Monopoly (1985 video game)
- Monopoly (1988 video game)
- Monopoly (1991 video game)
- Monopoly (1995 video game)
- Monopoly (1997 video game)
- Monopoly (1999 video game)
- Monopoly (2000 video game)

== People ==
- Alec Monopoly (born 1980s), American street artist
- Tony Monopoly (1944–1995), Australian singer and actor

== Other uses ==
- Monopoly (cereal), a breakfast food based on Cinnamon Toast Crunch
- Monopoly (McDonald's), a McDonald's sales promotion using the theme of board game Monopoly
- Monopoly money, the play money used in the board game, or any worthless currency
- Monopoly (album), 2009 album by Tuks
- Monopoly (wine), an area controlled by a single winery
- "Monopoly" (song), 2019 song by Ariana Grande and Victoria Monét

== See also ==
- Monopole (disambiguation)
- Monopoli (disambiguation)
- Monopolist (board game)
- Monopoly game (disambiguation)
