= List of Hasbro Interactive video games =

Hasbro Interactive was a software and video game subsidiary of Hasbro founded in 1995, and was sold to Infogrames in 2001.

== Hasbro Interactive ==
=== Adaptations of Hasbro properties ===
Game	Developer	Year	Platform	Note
Action Man: Raid on Island X	Intelligent Games	2000	Windows	
Action Man: Jungle Storm	Intelligent Games	2000	Windows	
Action Man: Mission Xtreme	Interactive Studios	2000	PlayStation	Known as Action Man: Operation Xtreme in North America.
Action Man: Destruction X	Blitz Games	2000	PlayStation	Published by The 3DO Company, only released in Europe.
Axis and Allies	Meyer/Glass Interactive	1998	Windows	
Battleship	NMS Software	1996	Windows	
Battleship: Surface Thunder	Meyer/Glass Interactive	2000	Windows	
Beast Wars: Transformers	SCE Cambridge Studio	1997	Windows, PlayStation	Based on the TV show of the same name.
Boggle	PCA, Inc., Third-i Productions	1996	Windows	
Clue	3T Productions Ltd.	1996	Windows	Known as Cluedo outside North America
Clue: Murder at Boddy Mansion	EAI Interactive	1998	Windows	Known as Cluedo: Murder at Blackwell Grange outside North America
Clue Chronicles: Fatal Illusion	EAI Interactive	1999	Windows	Known as Cluedo Chronicles: Fatal Illusion outside North America
The Game of Life	Mass Media; The Collective (PlayStation)	1997	Windows, PlayStation	PlayStation version only released in North America.
Mastermind	Gremlin Interactive	1997	Windows	
Milton Bradley Classic Board Games	Random Games Inc.	1999	Windows	
Monopoly	Westwood Studios	1995	Windows, Macintosh	Branded under Parker Brothers.
Monopoly	Gremlin Interactive	1997	PlayStation	
Monopoly	Mind's Eye Productions	1999	Nintendo 64	Only released in North America.
Monopoly	Artech Studios	1999/2000	Windows, Macintosh	Published by MacSoft on the Macintosh.
Monopoly Casino	Leaping Lizard Software	1999	Windows	Casino simulator.
Monopoly Junior	Mind's Eye Productions	1999	Windows	Version of Monopoly made for younger children.
Monopoly Star Wars	Artech Studios	1997	Windows	Star Wars themed version of Monopoly.
Monopoly World Cup France 98 Edition	Mind's Eye Productions	1998	Windows	World Cup-themed version of Monopoly. Only released in the United Kingdom and France
Mr. Potato Head Saves Veggie Valley	Duck Soup Productions Inc., Turning Point Software	1995	Windows, Macintosh	Branded under Playskool.
Mr Potato Head Activity Pack	ImageBuilder	1997	Windows	
Mr. and Mrs. Potato Head Go on Holiday	Europress	2000	Windows	Released by Infogrames in the United States as Mr. and Mrs. Potato Head Go on Vacation
My Little Pony: Friendship Gardens	Artech Studios	1998	Windows	
Nerf Jr. Foam Blaster - Attack of the Kleptons!	ImaginEngine	1999	Windows	Contained a light gun that resembled a real Nerf blaster.
Operation!	ImaginEngine	1999	Windows	
Outburst	CyberDice Interactive	1998	Windows	
Pictionary	Imagebuilder Software	1997	Windows	
Risk	BlueSky Software, NMS Software	1996	Windows	
Risk	Runecraft	1997	PlayStation	
Scrabble	Random Games Inc.	1996	Windows	
Scrabble	Runecraft	1999	PlayStation	Published by Hasbro in North America only. European version published in 2001 by Ubi Soft under license from Mattel.
Sorry!	Third-I Productions	1997	Windows	
Stratego	Mind's Eye Productions	1998	Windows	
Super Scattergories	CyberDice Interactive	1998	Windows	
Tonka Construction	Vortex Media Arts	1996	Windows	
Tonka Search and Rescue	Media Station	1997	Windows	
Tonka Garage	Media Station	1999	Windows	
Tonka Construction 2	ImaginEngine	1999	Windows	sequel to Tonka Construction.
Tonka Raceway	Media Station	1999	Windows, Game Boy Color	
Tonka Space Station	Data Design Interactive	2000	Windows, PlayStation	
Tonka Workshop	Media Station	2000	Windows	Comes with an interactive tool workbench that attaches to the keyboard.
Ultimate Yahtzee	PCA Inc.	1996	Windows	
Upwords	Random Games	1999	Windows	

=== Non-Hasbro titles ===
Game	Developer	Year	Platform	Note
Frogger	SCE Cambridge Studio	1997	Windows, PlayStation	A remake of Konami's arcade game of the same name.
Wheel of Fortune	Artech Studios	1998	Windows, PlayStation	Game adaption of the Game Show of the same name. Only released in North America
Wheel of Fortune 2nd Edition	Artech Studios	2000	Windows, PlayStation	Sequel to Wheel of Fortune. Only released in North America
Jeopardy!	Artech Studios	1998	Windows, PlayStation	Game adaption of the Game Show of the same name. Only released in North America
Jeopardy! 2nd Edition	Artech Studios	2000	Windows, PlayStation	Sequel to Jeopardy!. Only released in North America
Family Feud	Artech Studios	2000	Windows, PlayStation	Only released in North America. Although an altered version of this title was released on the PC in the United Kingdom by Infogrames as Family Fortunes.
Slingo	Random Games	1998	Windows	
Smart Games Challenge 3	Smart Games	1998	Windows	Sequel to Smart Games Challenge and Smart Games Challenge 2.
Super Scattergories	CyberDice Interactive	1998	Windows	
Glover	Interactive Studios	1998	Nintendo 64, Windows	N64 version distributed by Nintendo in Europe.
H.E.D.Z.	VIS Entertainment	1998	Windows	
Stratego	Mind's Eye Productions	1998	Windows	
Small Soldiers: Squad Commander	DreamWorks Interactive	1998	Windows	Tie-In to the Small Soldiers movie.
Small Soldiers: Globotech Design Lab	unknown	1998	Windows	
Atari Arcade Hits Volume 1	Digital Eclipse	1999	Windows	A compilation of 6 different Atari games.
Thomas & Friends: The Great Festival Adventure	Mind's Eye Productions	1999	Windows	Educational game based on the Thomas & Friends TV series.
Thomas & Friends: Trouble on the Tracks	Mind's Eye Productions	2000	Windows	Educational game based on the Thomas & Friends TV series.
Frogger 2: Swampy's Revenge	Blitz Games	2000	Windows, PlayStation, Dreamcast	Sequel to Hasbro's Frogger remake.
Pac-Man: Adventures in Time	Mind's Eye Productions & Creative Asylum	2000	Windows	A variantation on the classic Pac-Man maze formula.
Galaga: Destination Earth	King of the Jungle	2000	Windows, PlayStation	A remake of the classic Namco arcade game.
Atari Arcade Hits Volume 2	Digital Eclipse	2000	Windows	A compilation of 6 different Atari games.
Nascar Heat	Monster Games; Digital Illusions CE (PlayStation)	2000	Windows, PlayStation	Only released in North America.
Daytona USA 2001	Amusement Vision & Genki	2000/2001	Dreamcast	A remake of the Sega arcade game Daytona USA. European version uses the Infogrames label.

== Atari Interactive ==
Game	Developer	Year	Platform	Note
Centipede	Leaping Lizard Software; Real Sports Games (PlayStation); Westlake Interactive (Macintosh)	1998/1999	Windows, PlayStation, Dreamcast, Macintosh	3D remake of the arcade game of the same name. Published by MacSoft on the Macintosh in 2001.
The Next Tetris	Blue Planet Software	1999	PlayStation, Windows	A variantation of Tetris with 3D elements. Published by Crave Entertainment on the Dreamcast.
Missile Command	Meyer/Glass Interactive & Rainbow Studios	1999	Windows, PlayStation	3D remake of the arcade game of the same name.
Pong: The Next Level	Supersonic Software	1999	Windows, PlayStation	3D remake of the arcade game of the same name. Known as Pong in Europe.
Q*bert	Artech Studios; Pipe Dream Interactive (Dreamcast)	1999/2000	Windows, PlayStation, Dreamcast	3D remake of the arcade game of the same name. Dreamcast version was only released in North America and distributed by Majesco.
Glover	Interactive Studios	1999	PlayStation	Port of the game of the same name.
Nerf Arena Blast	Visionary Media	1999	Windows	A kid-friendly First-Person-Shooter running on Unreal Engine. Known as Nerf Arena in Europe.
Breakout	Supersonic Software	2000	Windows, PlayStation, Macintosh	3D remake of the arcade game of the same name. Published by MacSoft on the Macintosh in 2001.

== MicroProse ==
Game	Developer	Year	Platform	Note
Arcade Pool II	Team17	1999	Windows	Updated and overhauled version of Arcade Pool.
Avalon Hill's Diplomacy	Meyer/Glass Interactive	1999	Windows	
Avalon Hill's Squad Leader	Random Games	2000	Windows	
B-17 Flying Fortress: The Mighty 8th	Wayward Design	2000	Windows	
Civilization II: Test of Time	MicroProse; Coolhand Interactive	1999	Windows	Remake of Civilization II.
European Air War	MicroProse	1998	Windows	
Falcon 4.0	MicroProse Alameda	1998	Windows	
GP 500	Melbourne House	1999	Windows	
Grand Prix 3	MicroProse Chipping Sodbury	2000	Windows	Third installment in MicroProse's Grand Prix series.
Grand Prix World	MicroProse Chipping Sodbury	1999	Windows	Spin-off installment in MicroProse's Grand Prix series.
Gunship!	MicroProse	2000	Windows	Remake of the game of the same name.
MechCommander Gold	FASA Interactive	1999	Windows	Deluxe version of MechCommander featuring the base game and the Desperate Measures Expansion.
MechWarrior 3	Zipper Interactive	1999	Windows	Third installment in the MechWarrior series.
MechWarrior 3: Pirate's Moon	Zipper Interactive	2000	Windows	Expansion Pack to MechWarrior 3.
Risk II (2000)	Deep Red Games	2000	Windows	Sequel to Risk.
RollerCoaster Tycoon	Chris Sawyer	1999	Windows	
RollerCoaster Tycoon: Added Attractions	Chris Sawyer	1999	Windows	Expansion Pack to RollerCoaster Tycoon. Known as Corkscrew Follies in North America.
RollerCoaster Tycoon: Loopy Landscapes	Chris Sawyer	2000	Windows	Expansion Pack to RollerCoaster Tycoon.
Spirit of Speed 1937	Broadsword Interactive	1999	Windows	Released in Europe only. Dreamcast version published by Acclaim Entertainment worldwide.
Star Trek: The Next Generation – Birth of the Federation	MicroProse	1999	Windows	4X turn-based strategy video game.
Starship Troopers: Terran Ascendancy	Blue Tongue Entertainment	2000	Windows	
Top Gun: Hornet's Nest	Zipper Interactive	1998	Windows	
Worms Armageddon	Team17	1999	Windows, PlayStation, Dreamcast	
