= 1988 in video games =

1988 saw many sequels and prequels in video games, such as Dragon Quest III, Super Contra, Mega Man 2, Double Dragon II: The Revenge, and Super Mario Bros. 3, along with new titles such as Assault, Altered Beast, Capcom Bowling, Ninja Gaiden, RoboCop, Winning Run and Chase H.Q.

The year's highest-grossing arcade video games were After Burner and After Burner II in Japan, Double Dragon in the United States, Operation Wolf in the United Kingdom, and RoboCop in Hong Kong. The year's best‑selling home system was the Nintendo Entertainment System (Famicom) for the fifth year in a row, while the year's best-selling home video games were Dragon Quest III in Japan and Super Mario Bros./Duck Hunt in the United States.

== Events ==
- Out Run wins Game of the Year at the 5th Golden Joystick Awards, for the year 1987.
- June – Nintendo releases the last issue (#7) of Nintendo Fun Club News.
- July – Nintendo releases the first issue of Nintendo Power magazine.
- December - Namco releases their first 3D polygon video game, Winning Run, running on the Namco System 21 arcade board.

== Financial performance ==
=== Highest-grossing arcade games ===
==== Japan ====
In Japan, the following titles were the highest-grossing arcade games of 1988, according to the annual Gamest and Game Machine charts.

Rank	Gamest		Game Machine		
Rank	Title	Manufacturer	Title	Type	Points
1	After Burner	Sega	After Burner / After Burner II	Cockpit cabinet	3624
2	World Stadium	Namco	Operation Wolf	Upright cabinet	3569
3	Gradius II	Konami	Final Lap	Deluxe / Standard	3568
4	Out Run	Sega	Kyukyoku Tiger (Twin Cobra)	Conversion kit	3192
5	Final Lap	Namco	World Stadium	Conversion kit	3105
6	R-Type	Irem	R-Type	Conversion kit	3074
7	Super Hang-On	Sega	Out Run	Deluxe cabinet	2921
8	Street Fighter	Capcom	Hi Sho Zame (Flying Shark)	Conversion kit	2109
9	Kyukyoku Tiger (Twin Cobra)	Toaplan	Galaga '88	Conversion kit	1990
10	Rainbow Islands: The Story of Bubble Bobble 2	Taito	Gradius II	Conversion kit	1939

==== Hong Kong and United States ====
In Hong Kong and the United States, the following titles were the highest-grossing arcade games of 1988.

Rank	Hong Kong	United States		
Rank	Bondeal	Play Meter	AMOA	
Rank	Bondeal	Play Meter	Dedicated cabinet	Conversion kit
1	RoboCop	Double Dragon	Double Dragon	Shinobi
2	Chequered Flag	Unknown	Out Run, After Burner, Operation Wolf, Bad Dudes Vs. DragonNinja	Twin Eagle, Heavy Barrel, Capcom Bowling, Time Soldiers
3	Devastators	Unknown	Out Run, After Burner, Operation Wolf, Bad Dudes Vs. DragonNinja	Twin Eagle, Heavy Barrel, Capcom Bowling, Time Soldiers
4	P.O.W.	Unknown	Out Run, After Burner, Operation Wolf, Bad Dudes Vs. DragonNinja	Twin Eagle, Heavy Barrel, Capcom Bowling, Time Soldiers
5	Vindicators	Unknown	Out Run, After Burner, Operation Wolf, Bad Dudes Vs. DragonNinja	Twin Eagle, Heavy Barrel, Capcom Bowling, Time Soldiers
6	Sky Soldiers	Unknown	—N/a	
7	Bad Dudes Vs. DragonNinja	Unknown	—N/a	
8	Blasteroids	Unknown	—N/a	
9	Vigilante	Unknown	—N/a	
10	Xybots	Unknown	—N/a	

==== United Kingdom ====
Operation Wolf was the top-earning arcade game of 1988 in the United Kingdom. The following titles were the top-grossing games on the monthly arcade charts in 1988.

Month	Title	Manufacturer	Genre	Ref
January	Operation Wolf	Taito	Light gun shooter	
February	Operation Wolf	Taito	Light gun shooter	
March	Operation Wolf	Taito	Light gun shooter	
April	Unknown	Unknown	Unknown	Unknown
May	Unknown	Unknown	Unknown	Unknown
June	Street Fighter	Capcom	Fighting	
1988	Operation Wolf			

=== Best-selling home systems ===
Rank	System(s)	Manufacturer	Type	Generation	Sales			
Rank	System(s)	Manufacturer	Type	Generation	Japan	USA	EU	Worldwide
1	Nintendo Entertainment System / Famicom	Nintendo	Console	8-bit	1,590,000	7,000,000	Unknown	8,590,000+
2	Mark III / Master System	Sega	Console	8-bit	240,000	1,000,000	195,000	1,435,000+
3	Commodore 64	Commodore	Computer	8-bit	—N/a	—N/a	—N/a	1,250,000
4	IBM Personal Computer (IBM PC)	IBM	Computer	16-bit	Unknown	1,229,000	Unknown	1,229,000+
5	Mac	Apple Inc.	Computer	16-bit	—N/a	—N/a	—N/a	900,000
6	PC Engine / TurboGrafx-16	NEC	Console	16-bit	830,000	—N/a	—N/a	830,000
7	NEC UltraLite / PC-88 / PC-98	NEC	Computer	8-bit / 16-bit	700,000	95,000+	Unknown	795,000+
8	Mega Drive / Genesis	Sega	Console	16-bit	400,000	—N/a	—N/a	400,000
9	Amiga	Commodore	Computer	16-bit	—N/a	—N/a	—N/a	400,000
10	Compaq IBM PC compatible	Compaq	Computer	8-bit / 16-bit	Unknown	365,000+	Unknown	365,000+

=== Best-selling home video games ===
==== Japan ====
The following titles were the top ten best-selling home video games of 1988 in Japan, according to the annual Family Computer Magazine (Famimaga) charts.

Rank	Title	Platform	Developer	Publisher	Genre(s)	Sales
1	Dragon Quest III: Soshite Densetsu e...	Famicom	Chunsoft	Enix	Role-playing	3,800,000
2	Super Mario Bros. 3	Famicom	Nintendo R&D4	Nintendo	Platform	Unknown
3	Pro Yakyū: Family Stadium '87	Famicom	Namco	Namco	Sports (baseball)	< 1,300,000
4	Kyūkyoku Harikiri Stadium	Famicom	Taito	Taito	Sports (baseball)	Unknown
5	Captain Tsubasa (Tecmo Cup Soccer Game)	Famicom	Tecmo	Tecmo	Sports (association football)	< 700,000
6	Momotaro Densetsu	Famicom	Hudson Soft	Hudson Soft	Role-playing	Unknown
7	Dragon Ball: Daimaō Fukkatsu	Famicom	TOSE	Bandai	Role-playing / card battle	< 530,000
8	Saint Seiya: Ōgon Densetsu	Famicom	TOSE	Bandai	Action role-playing	Unknown
9	Final Fantasy	Famicom	Squaresoft	Squaresoft	Role-playing	< 520,000
10	Gegege no Kitaro: Youkai Daimakyou (Ninja Kid)	Famicom	TOSE	Bandai	Platform	Unknown

==== United Kingdom and United States ====
In the United States, the NES Action Set bundled with Super Mario Bros./Duck Hunt was the best-selling toy of 1988. The same year, Super Mario Bros. 2 became one of the best-selling cartridges of all time, Super Mario Bros. 2 and Zelda II: The Adventure of Link were the top-selling cartridges during the holiday season, and The Legend of Zelda and Mike Tyson's Punch-Out!! each crossed 2 million sales between 1987 and 1988.

The following titles were the top-selling home video games of each month in the United Kingdom and United States during 1988.

Month	United Kingdom		United States			
Month	All systems	ZX Spectrum	Weeks 1-2	Weeks 3-4	Platform	Ref
January	Unknown	Out Run	Mike Tyson's Punch-Out!	Top Gun	NES	
February	Unknown	Platoon	Mike Tyson's Punch-Out!		NES	
March	Unknown	Platoon	Mike Tyson's Punch-Out!	The Legend of Zelda	NES	
April	Unknown	We Are the Champions	Ice Hockey		NES	
May	Steve Davis Snooker	Target: Renegade	Ice Hockey	The Legend of Zelda	NES	
June	Target: Renegade (ZX Spectrum)		Mike Tyson's Punch-Out!	The Legend of Zelda	NES	
July	Football Manager 2		The Legend of Zelda	Double Dragon	NES	
August	Football Manager 2	European Five-a-Side	R.B.I. Baseball	Double Dragon	NES	
September	Bomb Jack	Football Manager 2	Double Dragon		NES	
October	Daley Thompson's Olympic Challenge	Bomb Jack	Super Mario Bros. 2		NES	
November	Last Ninja 2		Super Mario Bros. 2		NES	
December	Operation Wolf	RoboCop	Super Mario Bros. 2		NES	
1988			Super Mario Bros./Duck Hunt		NES	

== Top-rated games ==
=== Major awards ===
==== Japan ====
Award	2nd Gamest Awards (December 1988)	3rd Famitsu Best Hit Game Awards (February 1989)	3rd Famimaga Game Awards (February 1989)
Award	Arcade	Console	Famicom
Game of the Year	Gradius II	Dragon Quest III (Famicom)	
Critics' Choice Awards	—N/a	Dragon Spirit (PC Engine); Sangokushi (Famicom); Nobunaga no Yabō: Zenkokuban (Famicom); Family Circuit (Famicom); Captain Tsubasa (Famicom); Chô Wakusei Senki Metafight (Famicom); Rockman (Famicom)	—N/a
Best Arcade Conversion	—N/a	R-Type (PC Engine)	—N/a
Best Playability	—N/a	—N/a	Super Mario Bros. 3
Best Scenario / Story	—N/a	Final Fantasy (Famicom)	—N/a
Best Graphics	Forgotten Worlds	Alien Crush (PC Engine)	—N/a
Best Music / Sound	The Ninja Warriors	Galaga '88 (PC Engine)	Dragon Quest III
Special Award	After Burner II	—N/a	—N/a
Original / Frontier Spirit / Spotlight	Syvalion	No-Ri-Ko (PC Engine CD-ROM²)	Captain Tsubasa
Best Character / Character Design	Bravoman (Bravoman)	Dragon Quest III (Famicom)	Super Mario Bros. 3
Best Game Company	Namco	—N/a	—N/a
Best Action Game	—N/a	Super Mario Bros. 3 (Famicom)	
Best Shooter / Shoot 'Em Up	Gradius II / Ultimate Tiger	Gradius II (Famicom)	—N/a
Best RPG	—N/a	Dragon Quest III (Famicom)	
Best Action RPG	—N/a	Ys I: Ancient Ys Vanished (Sega Mark III)	—N/a
Best Adventure Game	—N/a	Famicom Detective Club (Famicom); Princess Tomato in the Salad Kingdom (Famicom)	Famicom Detective Club
Best Simulation / Strategy Game	—N/a	Famicom Wars (Famicom)	
Best Sports Game	World Stadium	—N/a	Pro Yakyū: Family Stadium '87
Best Puzzle Game	—N/a	Tetris (Famicom)	—N/a
Best Value for Money	—N/a	—N/a	Dragon Quest III
Best Ending	Gradius II	—N/a	—N/a
Best Performance	—N/a	Ninja Ryūkenden (Ninja Gaiden)	—N/a
Best Commercial	—N/a	Famicom Wars (Famicom)	—N/a

==== United Kingdom ====
Award	Sinclair User Awards (December 1988)	6th Golden Joystick Awards (April 1989)		
Award	Arcade	8-bit computer	16-bit computer	Console
Game of the Year	Operation Wolf		Speedball	Thunder Blade (Master System)
Best Arcade / Coin-Op Conversion	—N/a	Operation Wolf		—N/a
Best Graphics	—N/a	Armalyte	Rocket Ranger	—N/a
Best VGM / Soundtrack	—N/a	Bionic Commando	International Karate +	—N/a
Best Original Game	Dynamite Düx	—N/a	—N/a	—N/a
Best Software House	—N/a	Ocean Software	Mirrorsoft	—N/a
Best Progammer	—N/a	John Phillips	The Bitmap Brothers	—N/a
Best Shooter / Shoot 'Em Up	Galaxy Force	—N/a	—N/a	—N/a
Best Beat 'Em Up	Bad Dudes Vs. DragonNinja	—N/a	—N/a	—N/a
Best Adventure Game	—N/a	Corruption	Fish!	—N/a
Best Simulation Game	—N/a	MicroProse Soccer	Falcon	—N/a
Best Racing Game	Power Drift	—N/a	—N/a	—N/a

==== United States ====
Award	Computer Gaming World (November 1988)		Electronic Gaming Monthly (1989)	Computer Entertainer Awards of Excellence (January 1989)		VideoGames & Computer Entertainment (February 1989)	
Award	Master System	NES	Console	Console	Computer	Console	Computer
Game of the Year	—N/a	—N/a	Double Dragon (NES)	Super Mario Bros. 2 (NES); Phantasy Star (SMS)	—N/a	Zaxxon 3D (Master System)	Superstar Ice Hockey
Entertainment Program of the Year	—N/a	—N/a	—N/a	—N/a	Rocket Ranger (AMI); Wizardry IV (APL2); Bubble Ghost (GS); Captain Blood (ST); Pool of Radiance (C64); Battlehawks 1942 (IBM PC); The Colony (Mac)	—N/a	—N/a
Arcade Conversion	Out Run	Arkanoid	Rampage (Master System)	—N/a	—N/a	Arkanoid (NES)	
Best Graphics	Rocky	Side Pocket	Phantasy Star (SMS)	—N/a	King's Quest IV	Side Pocket (NES)	Rocket Ranger
Sound / Soundtrack	Rocky	Side Pocket	—N/a	—N/a	King's Quest IV	Side Pocket (NES)	Rocket Ranger
Original / Innovative	—N/a	Jaws	Blaster Master (NES)	Monopoly (Master System)	Battle Chess	—N/a	—N/a
Action / Arcade-Style	Space Harrier	R.C. Pro-Am	Contra (NES)	—N/a	Chop N' Drop	Blaster Master (NES)	Skate or Die!
Shooter / Target Game	Missile Defense 3-D	Hogan's Alley	Contra (NES)	—N/a	—N/a	—N/a	—N/a
Best Adventure Game / Fantasy	—N/a	The Legend of Zelda	—N/a	—N/a	Manhunter: New York	The Legend of Zelda (NES)	Neuromancer
Best Strategy Game	—N/a	—N/a	—N/a	—N/a	Decisive Battles	Monopoly (NES)	The Fool's Errand
Best Simulation / Simulator	—N/a	—N/a	—N/a	—N/a	P51 Mustang Flight Sim; PT-109 (Mac)	—N/a	Test Drive
Best Sports Game	Great Volleyball	Pro Wrestling	Bases Loaded (NES)	Ice Hockey (NES); Great Basketball (SMS)	Star Rank Boxing (APL2); Fast Break (C64); Jack Nicklaus Golf (PC)	Bases Loaded (NES)	Super Bowl Sunday
Best Action-Strategy	Monopoly	Raid on Bungeling Bay	—N/a	—N/a	—N/a	—N/a	Tetris
Designer of the Year	—N/a	—N/a	—N/a	—N/a	Ezra Sidran	—N/a	—N/a
Best Educational	—N/a	—N/a	—N/a	—N/a	Mixed-Up Mother Goose	—N/a	—N/a
Most Humorous	—N/a	—N/a	—N/a	—N/a	Shufflepuck Café (Mac)	—N/a	—N/a

=== Famitsu Platinum Hall of Fame ===
The following 1988 video game releases entered Famitsu magazine's "Platinum Hall of Fame" for receiving Famitsu scores of at least 35 out of 40.

Title	Score (out of 40)	Developer	Publisher	Genre	Platform
Dragon Quest III: Soshite Densetsu e... (Dragon Warrior III)	38	Chunsoft	Enix	RPG	Family Computer (Famicom)
Final Fantasy II	35	Squaresoft	Squaresoft	RPG	Family Computer (Famicom)
Super Mario Bros. 3	35	Nintendo EAD	Nintendo	Platform	Family Computer (Famicom)

== Business ==
- New companies: Eurocom, Image Works, Koeo, Stormfront, Visual Concepts, Walt Disney Computer Software
- Defunct: Aackosoft, Coleco, Sente, Spectravideo
- Activision renamed to Mediagenic
- Nintendo vs. Camerica lawsuit: Nintendo sues Camerica over the clone production of an Advantage joystick controller for the NES console

== Notable releases ==
=== Arcade ===
- April – Namco releases Assault, which may be the first game to use hardware rotation of sprites and the background.
- August – Sega releases Altered Beast, later ported to the Mega Drive/Genesis where it was packaged with the console in North America and Europe.
- December – Capcom releases Ghouls 'n Ghosts, the sequel to Ghosts 'n Goblins.
- December – Namco releases Winning Run, the first polygonal 3D arcade racing game.
- December – Technōs Japan releases Double Dragon II: The Revenge, the first sequel to Double Dragon, released during the previous year.
- Atari Games releases an official arcade version of Tetris as well as Cyberball and Toobin'.
- Namco releases World Stadium, Berabow Man, Märchen Maze, Baraduke II, Ordyne, Metal Hawk, World Court, Splatterhouse, which is the first game to get a parental advisory disclaimer, Mirai Ninja, Face Off and Phelios.
- Williams releases the violent, drug-themed NARC, beginning a run of major hits for the company.

=== Home ===
- January 2 – Electronic Arts releases Wasteland.
- January 5 – shareware game The Adventures of Captain Comic is one of the first NES-style scrolling platform games for MS-DOS, setting the stage for a subsequent shareware boom.
- January 8 – Konami releases Super Contra.
- January 14 – Konami releases Konami Wai Wai World the first ever crossover game features cast of all star characters from various video game franchises & non-video game properties such as characters from blockbuster movies.
- January 29 – the first commercial versions of Tetris are released.
- February 10 – Enix releases Dragon Quest III.
- March – R.C. Pro-Am is released and becomes a hit for the NES, drawing attention to UK developer Rare.
- July 20 – Capcom releases Bionic Commando, for NES/Famicom based on the 1987 arcade game of the same title.
- August – Zortech releases Big Bang.
- October 5 – Origin Systems releases Ultima V: Warriors of Destiny, which includes a time-of-day system and daily schedules for non-player characters.
- October 9 – Nintendo revamps Doki Doki Panic and releases it as Super Mario Bros. 2, for the Nintendo Entertainment System in America and the PAL region. Birdo made her debut in this game and released in Japan as Super Mario USA in 1992.
- October 23 – Nintendo releases Super Mario Bros. 3 for the Famicom in Japan. First appearance of the Koopalings.
- December 1 – Nintendo releases Zelda II: The Adventure of Link in America. The game had been released nearly two years earlier in Japan on the Famicom Disk System, before America even saw the first The Legend of Zelda.
- December 9 – Tecmo releases Ninja Gaiden for the NES/Famicom.
- December 17 – Square Co. releases Final Fantasy II for the Famicom as the second installment of the Final Fantasy series.
- December 24 – Capcom releases Mega Man 2 in Japan, eventually becoming the highest-selling installment of the entire Mega Man franchise with a total of 1.5 million copies sold.
- Pool of Radiance the first of the SSI Gold Box games is released, the first computer RPG officially based on Advanced Dungeons & Dragons.
- Superior Software release Exile on the Acorn Electron and BBC Micro. A complex arcade adventure, it is the first with a full physics engine.
- Sega releases Phantasy Star outside Japan for the Master System, the first in the company's most successful series of role-playing video games.
- Electronic Arts releases John Madden Football for the Apple II, starting its highly successful line of American football games.
- Interplay's animated chess program Battle Chess is released for the Amiga, then widely ported.
- Pioneer Plague makes use of the Amiga's 4096 color Hold-And-Modify mode, something not thought possible for animated games.
- AMC Verlag releases Herbert for the Atari 8-bit computers.

=== Hardware ===
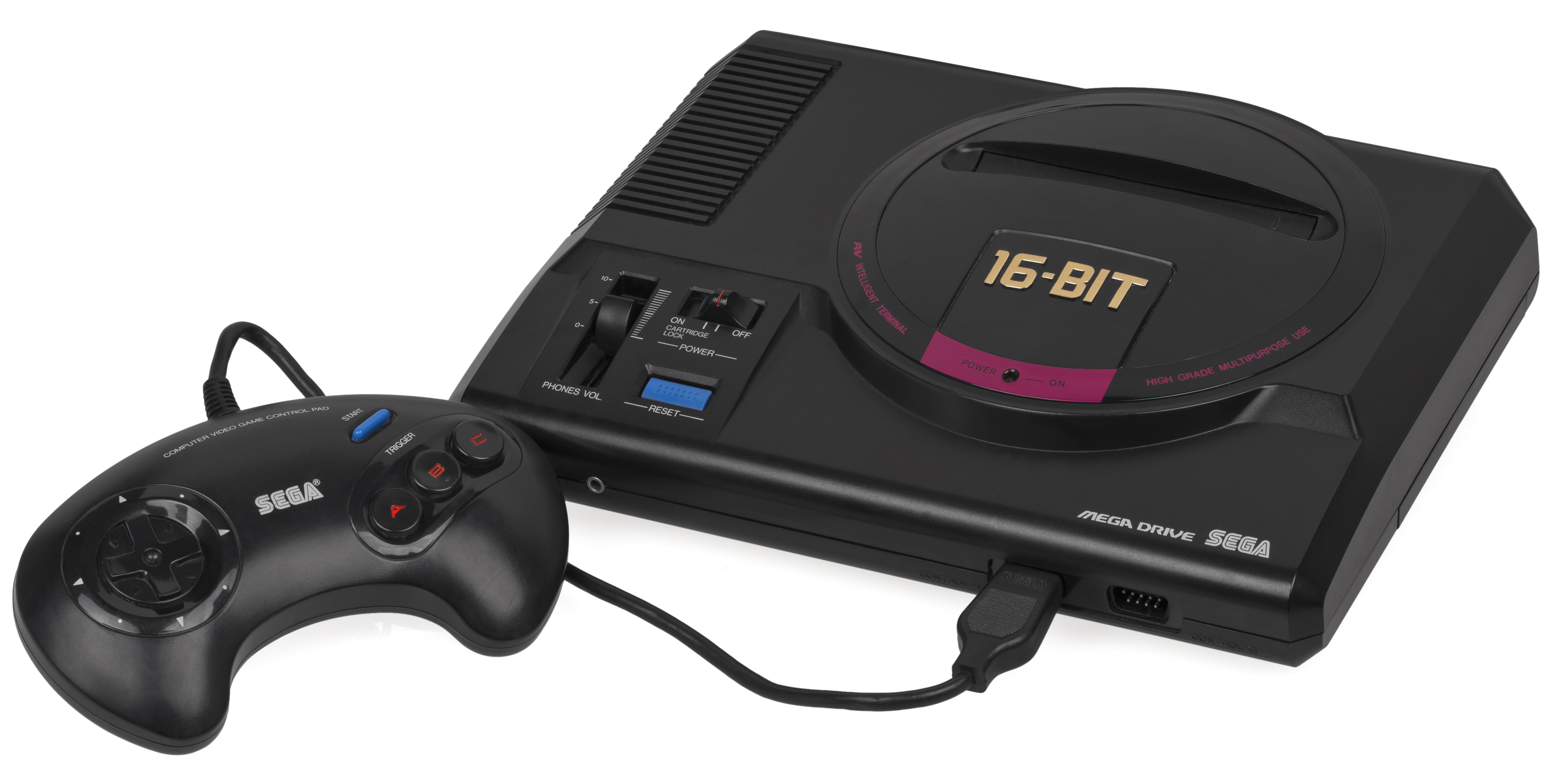
Sega Mega Drive

- October 29 – Mega Drive released in Japan.
- Nintendo buys the rights to Bandai's Family Trainer and re-releases it as the Power Pad.
- Namco releases the Namco System 21, the first arcade system board specifically designed for 3D polygon graphics.

== See also ==
- 1988 in games
