= Monopol =

Monopol may refer to:

- Monopol (film), 1996 Swedish comedy film
- Monopol Hotel, Wroclaw, Poland
- Monopol Hotel, Katowice, Poland
- Monopol (magazine), German monthly art magazine

== See also ==
- Monopole (disambiguation)
- Monopoly
