= Michael Angelis =

English actor (1944–2020)

- Born: Nicolas Michael Angelis; 29 April 1944; Paddington, London, England
- Died: 30 May 2020 (aged 76); Thatcham, Berkshire, England
- Education: Royal Conservatoire of Scotland
- Occupation: Actor
- Years active: 1968–2015
- Spouses: Unknown (m. 1971, divorced) Helen Worth (m. 1991; div. 2001) Jennifer Khalastchi (m. 2003)
- Relatives: Paul Angelis (brother)

Nicolas Michael Angelis (29 April 1944 – 30 May 2020) was an English actor. He was best known for his television roles as Chrissie Todd in Boys from the Blackstuff, Martin Niarchos in G.B.H. and as the longest-running narrator of the British children's series Thomas & Friends from 1991 to 2012, as well as several other products and media related to the franchise.

== Early life and career ==
Nicolas Michael Angelis was born on 29 April 1944 in Paddington, London to an English mother, Margaret (née McCulla) (1920–1947), and a Greek father, Evangelos Angelis (1894–1959). He was raised in Dingle, Liverpool. He trained at the Royal Scottish Academy of Music and Drama, Glasgow, where he played roles in, among other works, Brendan Behan's The Hostage and The Zykovs by Maxim Gorky. He was featured in Boys from the Black Stuff (1982) and G.B.H..

Angelis appeared in comedies such as The Liver Birds (1975–1978) and Luv (1993–1994) and films such as A Nightingale Sang in Berkeley Square (1979) and No Surrender (1985). In 1983, he appeared at the Royal Exchange, Manchester in Harold Pinter's The Caretaker. He was a villain in the revived television series Auf Wiedersehen, Pet (2002), alongside former fellow Black Stuff star Alan Igbon. He narrated the British version of Thomas & Friends from 1991 to 2012, replacing Ringo Starr.

He narrated John Peel's autobiography, Margrave of the Marshes, which was broadcast on BBC Radio 4 in 2005. In 2006 he starred in Fated, a film set in Liverpool, and in 2007 he appeared in episodes of Midsomer Murders and The Bill. In September 2011 he participated in the BBC Radio 4 programme The Reunion, talking with other cast members about Boys from the Blackstuff.

== Personal life ==
Angelis married three times. His first marriage, in 1971, ended in divorce. He married the Coronation Street actress Helen Worth in 1991, although they had been a couple since the mid 1970s. They divorced in 2001, following his much-publicised affair with the woman who would become his third wife, Welsh model Jennifer Khalastchi, whom he married in 2003. He and Worth remained friends.

He was the younger brother of fellow actor Paul Angelis.

== Death ==
Angelis died from a heart attack at his home in Thatcham, Berkshire on 30 May 2020, at the age of 76.

== Filmography ==
=== Film ===
Year	Title	Role	Notes
1979	Me You and Him	Lucien	
1979	A Nightingale Sang in Berkeley Square	Pealer Bell	
1980	George and Mildred	Café proprietor	
1983	Pride of our Alley	Monty Banks	
1985	No Surrender	Mike	
1994	Woodcock	Cyril	
1996	Giving Tongue	Will Shaker	
2000	Thomas and the Magic Railroad	James, Percy, Splatter and Dodge	Voice actor workprints
2005	Thomas & Friends: Calling All Engines!	UK Narrator	
2006	Fated	Tatty	
2009	Thomas & Friends: Hero of the Rails	UK Narrator	
2010	Thomas & Friends: Misty Island Rescue	UK Narrator	
2011	Thomas & Friends: Day of the Diesels	UK Narrator	
2012	Thomas & Friends: Blue Mountain Mystery	UK Narrator	
2012	First Time Loser	Father Malachie	

=== Television ===
Year	Title	Role	Notes
1972	The Scobie Man	Fire Officer	
1972	The Thirty-Minute Theatre	Mike	
1972	Coronation Street	Franny Slater	Episode 1226
1972–1974	Z-Cars	Trev/Bobo	Episodes: "Week Off", "Bits An Bats"
1974	Village Hall	Terry Elliot	Season 1 Episode 1
1975–1996	The Liver Birds	Lucien Boswell	34 episodes
1976	Rock Follies	Stavros	
1977	Crown Court	Lewis Van Doren	Episode: "The Family Business: Part 1"
1977–1978	Robin's Nest	Niarchos/Waiter	Season 1 Episode 3, Season 2 Episode 4
1979	Hazell	Scouse Benny	Episode: "Hazell Gets the Bird"
1980	Minder	Nick	Series 1, Episode 10: "The Dessert Song"
1981	The Little World of Don Camillo (TV Series)	1st Salesman	
1981	BBC2 Playhouse	Frankie	Season 7, Episode 15
1981	World's End	Danny	
1982	Wood and Walters	Chuck Sweeney/Visitor	Season 1, Episode 5 and 6
1982	The Gaffer	'Bad-Back' Barker	Episode: "Unfit as a Fiddle"
1982	Boys from the Blackstuff	Christopher "Chrissie" Todd	
1982	The Professionals	Len Clarke	Episode: "Lawson's Last Stand"
1983	Reilly, Ace of Spies	Artuzov	Episodes: "The Last Journey", "Shutdown"
1983	Bergerac	Tony Morel	Episode: "Holiday Snaps"
1985	I Woke Up One Morning	Max	
1985	Summer Season	Jack Shaughnessy	Episode: "Time Trouble"
1987	The Marksman (TV series)	Irwin	
1989	Bread	Mr Cossack	Season 5, Episode 2
1989	The Russ Abbot Show		Season 4, Episode 2-4 (Anthony's Devon Adventure sketch) and 9
1990	Single Voices	Terence	Episode: "The Last Supper"
1991	G.B.H.	Martin Niarchos	
1991–2012	Thomas the Tank Engine & Friends	Narrator	UK version
1991–2012	Thomas the Tank Engine & Friends	Narrator	US version 2 episodes of Season 6, and 4 episodes of Season 7
1992	Wail of the Banshee	Merlin	
1992	Between the Lines	Det Insp Kendrick	Season 1, Episode 6
1992	Boon	Don Feldman	Episode: "Blackballed"
1993	Lovejoy	Tommy Norris	Episode: "Second Fiddle"
1993	Luv	Harold Craven	Season 1 Episode 4
1993–2015	Casualty	Gordon McCauley/Jez Ingrams/Ollie Yates/Stanley Momford	Season 7 Episode 24, Season 10 Episode 14, Season 13 Episode 14, Season 29 Episode 21
1993–1995	September Song	Arnie	
1994	Against All Odds	Episode: Snatched	
1995	Joseph	Rueben	
1996	Whatever Happened to The Liver Birds?	Lucien Boswell	
1997	Common As Muck	Pete	Season 2, Episode 4 and 5
1997	A Touch of Frost	Reggie Stansfield	Episode: "Penny for the Guy"
1997	Melissa	D.I Kilshaw	
1997	Harry Enfield and Chums		Appeared in the episode Harry Enfield and Christmas Chums alongside Thomas & Friends narrator Mark Moraghan
1998	The Jump	Donald Lewis	
2000	Holby City	Eddie Burke	Season 2 Episode 10
2000	Heartbeat	Frank McCready	Series 9 Episode 22 "With This Ring"
2000	Playing the Field	Chris Hurst	Season 3 Episode 1–6, Season 4 Episode 4
2002	Auf Wiedersehen, Pet	Mickey Startup	
2002	Always and Everyone	Frankie Hills	Episode: "A New Breed"
2003	Sweet Medicine	Liam	Season 1 Episode 5
2004	Merseybeat	Colin Nivern	Episode: "Distant Vices"
2006	Jack and the Sodor Construction Company	UK Narrator	Spinoff series of Thomas & Friends
2007	Midsomer Murders	Nicky Harding	Episode: "The Axeman Cometh"
2007	The Bill	Martin Donnelly	Episode: "Good Cop Bad Cop"
2012	Good Cop	Robert Rocksavage	

=== Video games ===
Year	Title	Role
1999	Thomas & Friends: The Great Festival Adventure	All characters
2000	Thomas & Friends: Trouble on the Tracks	All characters
2001	Thomas & Friends: Railway Adventures	Thomas, Harold, and Sir Topham Hatt
2002	Thomas & Friends: Building the New Line	All characters
2003	Thomas & Friends: Thomas Saves the Day	All characters
