= Monopoli (disambiguation) =

Monopoli is a town in Italy.

Monopoli may also refer to:

- Luigi Monopoli (born 1992), Italian footballer
- Monopoli, a 1984 song by Klaus Lage
- S.S. Monopoli 1966, a football club from Monopoli, Italy

== See also ==
- Diocese of Monopoli
- Roman Catholic Diocese of Conversano-Monopoli
- Monopoly (disambiguation)
- Monopol Hotel
