= Super Sunday =

Super Sunday may refer to:

== Sports ==
- Super Sunday or Super Bowl Sunday, the Sunday of the National Football League's championship game in the United States, the Super Bowl
- Super Sunday or Ford Super Sunday, a live Sunday afternoon Premier League football broadcast on Sky Sports in the UK

== Other ==
- Super Sunday (TV series), a 1980s American cartoon anthology series from Sunbow and Marvel Productions featuring Hasbro characters
- Super Sunday (phone-a-thon), the annual phone-a-thon fundraising drives held by Jewish federations throughout North America, on various Sundays of the year.
- Super Sunday (computer game), a 1986 video game published by Avalon Hill for the Apple II and Commodore 64
- Super Sunday, in New Orleans, refers to one of the annual celebrations staged by Mardi Gras Indian tribes, and held in Uptown, Downtown, or the west bank of New Orleans

== See also ==
- Super Soul Sunday, an American daytime television talk show hosted by Oprah Winfrey
