= The Railway Series and Thomas & Friends merchandise =

Branded children's merchandise

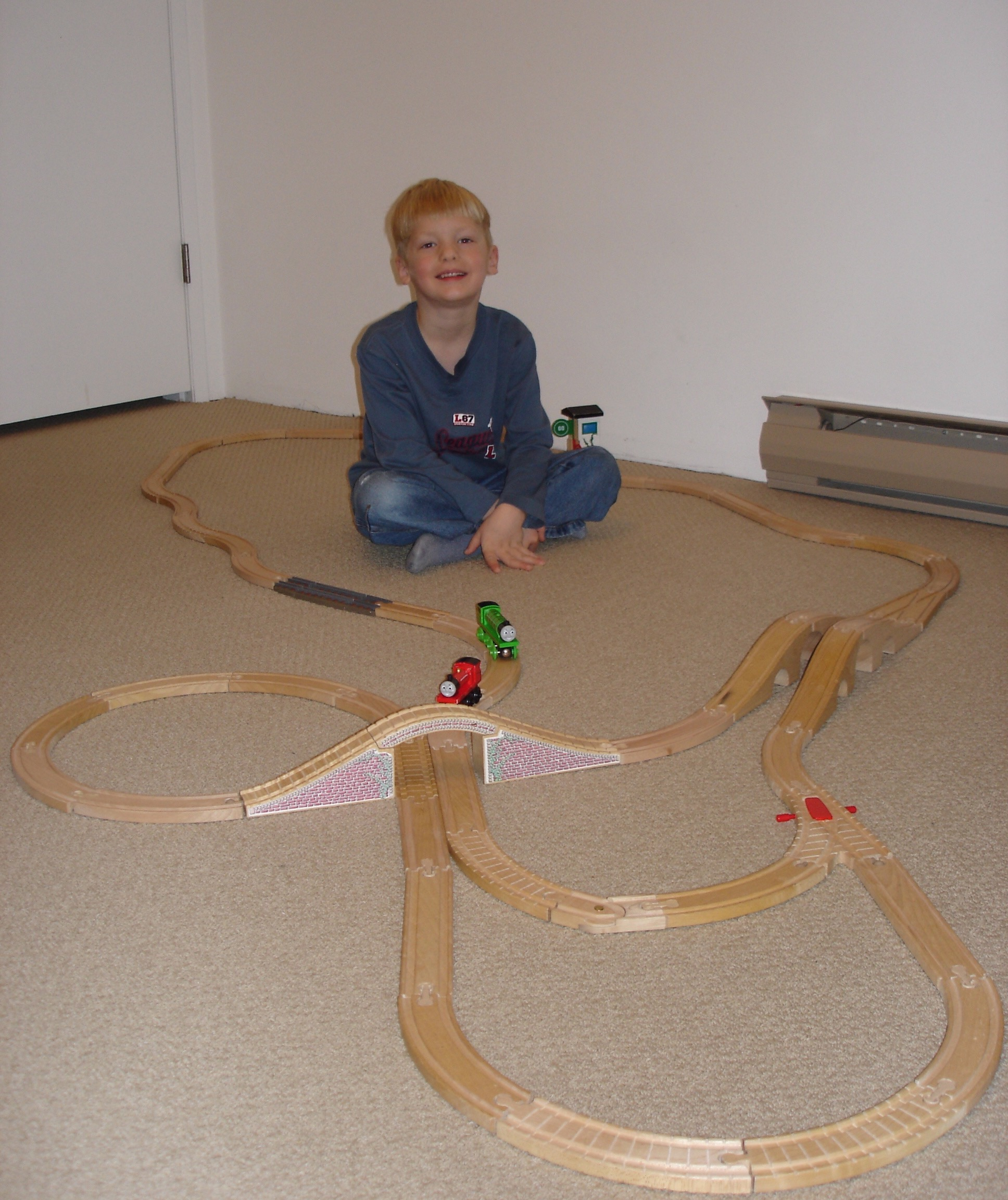
Top: Thomas & Friends: Wooden Railway toys. Bottom: Thomas & Friends: Take Along and Take N Play toys

Whilst merchandise for The Railway Series books by Wilbert Awdry was produced alongside the books, since the original broadcast of its television adaptation Thomas & Friends in 1984 in the United Kingdom, much more merchandise was produced for the television series. Large numbers of manufacturers have sought to produce items based on the Thomas & Friends franchise after the original television series was broadcast in the United States and Japan.

The most popular and wide-ranging merchandise are models of the characters, some including accompanying railway systems. Other popular products include videos, books and magazines, computer and video games, audiobooks, annuals, colouring and activity books, jigsaw puzzles, board games, stationery, clothing, cutlery, household items such as curtains, duvet covers and lampshades and soft drinks.

Thomas & Friends ranked number one in the preschool toys category in the U.S. and made the top 10 for the entire U.S. toy industry in 2010. In January 2011, Thomas & Friends ranked as the number-one preschool toy property in the U.K. for the 11th year in a row. Thomas is also a top-selling toy property in Australia, Germany, Japan and Korea. While the total traditional toy industry in the United States increased 1.9 per cent in 2010, overall Thomas & Friends toy sales increased over 47.1 per cent.

== Companies ==
=== Pre-Cut Model Engine Book ===
The first commercial models released alongside The Railway Series, in 1957, were 'Pre-cut Model Engine Books'. These were full-colour printed cardboard kits whose pieces could be pressed out, folded, and glued together to make fairly realistic models. They were produced through the 1960s. Four titles were published:

- "Thomas, with Annie the Coach"
- "Percy, with Clarabel the Coach"
- "Gordon the Big Engine and his Tender"
- "James the Red Engine and his Tender"

The advertisements on the back of the Railway Series books promised, "Other models are being prepared", although, even if ever prepared, they were likely never published as those 4 titles are the only ones that are known of.

A 12-page Thomas the Tank Engine Press-out Model Book (ISBN 0434927589) by Wilbert Awdry and Ken Stott, was released in September 1987.

In 1994, a new range of press-out models was released (ISBN 9780434977819, this time drawn by Ken Stott instead of C. Reginald Dalby. Each book came with various accessories including station staff, and a press-out of Tidmouth Station. The range consisted of Thomas and numerous other trains in the series.

=== Meccano ===
In 1967, Meccano Ltd released a train set featuring a clockwork model of Percy the Small Engine with some trucks—a yellow open wagon and a red closed van—and a circle of blue track. The model of Percy was a fair likeness of the pictures in the books and was about the size of an O gauge engine. The box featured special artwork by Peter Edwards and included the title, "Percy the Small Engine, brought to life by Meccano".

The plastic track was advertised as: "Gauge O track that clicks together and includes Brake Rail for automatic braking. Rails specially designed to make it easy to put the train on the track." In practice, although it was advertised as 'Gauge O', this only indicated the size of the model, since the track design was not compatible with anything else (the models were effectively 'flangeless').

Adverts for the set, which showed the model train 'emerging' from the book Percy the Small Engine, appeared in Meccano Magazine and on the back of the dust-covers for several of The Railway Series books in print at the time.

The train set was only produced in 1967, and is now extremely rare. It is notable as the last O Gauge train to be made at Meccano's famous Binns Road factory in Liverpool, where the Hornby tinplate trains were made.

Photographs of the set and the adverts may be found here and a close-up of Percy may be found here.

=== Ertl Company ===
Ertl was the first company to manufacture Thomas the Tank Engine & Friends characters and sets from 1984 in the UK and from 1989 in the US. Production ceased for the US market in 2002, and for the UK market in 2005 after RC2 Corporation acquired Ertl and discontinued the ranges to avoid conflict with the then existing Thomas license held by Learning Curve Brands, which produced the similar Take Along Thomas & Friends system.

==== Die-cast range ====
The most notable of the Ertl Company's Thomas ranges was a line of die-cast models and playsets. The range was very popular in the UK, and the nature of the subject matter encouraged collecting.

Thomas, Henry, and James were the first models to be released. The original Thomas featured a decal sticker sheet which allowed him to have different expressions. Percy, Toby, Annie and Clarabel, and Bertie followed in late 1985, with updated versions of Thomas, Henry, and James with red buffer beams to replace the older white ones. Edward and Gordon came out in 1988. In 1990, characters were updated with fixed plastic faces as the "sticker-face" models were prone to losing their faces. New vehicles were produced on a near-yearly basis, such as recently introduced characters to tie-in with their Television series appearance, as well as characters who had only appeared in The Railway Series books. In later years, special vehicles were created, such as metallic variants of engines, a Gold Thomas to celebrate the 50th Anniversary of The Railway Series, and a Millennium Silver Thomas in 2000.

The vehicles first used pin hook couplings to couple up and create trains. Locomotives had a moulded coupling 'eye' at each end, while rolling stock had one 'hook' coupling and one 'eye' coupling on the other end. In 2002, the vehicles were updated to use U-hook couplings, with less 'give', but they were more prone to breakage. The majority of locomotive models and some road vehicles had a diecast metal body with a moulded plastic chassis and plastic wheels. The bodies were fully painted and lined. They were free-wheeling although the chassis was rigid (locomotives were not fitted with separate bogies), and a steam locomotive's tender was part of the same moulding as its body. Models of coaches and trucks were assembled from self-coloured plastic mouldings, with some surface detail (such as coach sides) being applied using self-adhesive labels.

Sets and destinations were produced for the vehicles. The original playsets composed of playmats with illustrations of scenery and rails and moulded destinations. Later sets consisted of a grey connectable track system, with additional add-on destinations and pieces of track included with engines. The track system was updated in 2002 with detailed rail stickers and a green border.

The Ertl die-cast range was discontinued in the United States in 2002 and other parts of the world in 2005. It was effectively replaced by Learning Curve's Take-Along range.

==== Thomas Mini World ====
Miniatures was a Thomas line released in 1991. It featured main characters with sticker faces which were previously used in the die-cast range. Included with the character was a connectable block base in the form of a destination, such as a turntable, windmill, level crossing, or viaduct, made from plastic components to insert into the base, and an indented track section which requires adhesive stickers to be placed. The destinations can be connected to form a playset. Characters were sold in multi-packs of three. The range was discontinued in 1995. The engines were also re-released as Keyrings.

In 2002, the line was re-released and rebranded as Thomas Mini World. The characters were updated with moulded faces, and the bases were updated to a style similar to Lego, where the track pieces and buildings can be placed in different positions.

==== Gold Rail Series ====
Gold Rail Series was a Thomas line released in 1993. The products were from the Thomas Engine Collection Series made in Japan by Bandai only with coupling rods being removed. The vehicles have magnetic couplings which can connect to other vehicles using a connected switch. The playsets have a moulded section for track with self-adhesive labels for detail, have ramps on the edges for the engines to exit the destination, and feature detailed trackside accessories.

==== Large versions ====
Large Motorized versions of Thomas and Percy were released in 1985. These used the same designs as the die-cast versions, and can move when pulled back. A Remote Control Thomas and a Personalized Money Box was also released in 1985, similar in design to the Motorized version. They were discontinued shortly after.

==== Wind-Up versions ====
A range titled Pull Back and Go! featuring pullback versions of Thomas, Percy, Toby, and Bertie were released under Shining Time Station. A large wind-up Sir Topham Hatt was also produced, and later a Wind-Up series with Thomas, Percy, James, Henry, Bill, Ben, and Bertie.

==== Collector Cards ====
Sets containing eight collector cards of vehicles were made from 1996 to 1999, similar to the existing cards on the packaging design from those corresponding years which could be cut out.

=== Merit ===
Merit produced several push-along toys to tie-in with the TV series. These included a sit-on Thomas built for toddlers which had a black handle on the rear which enabled it to be pushed along by the parent, large push along versions using hook couplings of Thomas, Annie, and Clarabel and Percy with Troublesome Trucks, a small push along version of Thomas, Annie, and Clarabel using stronger pivot couplings, a Thomas toy with shaped holes and a set of blocks which could be inserted into the correct holes on the Thomas, and some larger scale battery-operated toys.

=== Hornby Railways ===
In 1985, Hornby Railways produced a series of 00 gauge model engines, track, accessories, and sets, based on Thomas & Friends, designed to be compatible with other Hornby trains, thus allowing an easy migration to more prototypical modelling. The range mainly utilised modified versions of existing Hornby engines, rolling stock and lineside accessories. Over the following years, the range expanded to include some of the main characters and rolling stock as well as train sets. During the 1990s, very few new products were made, and some vehicles discontinued. Some characters were gradually reintroduced towards the end of the decade, and more new items including major and minor characters were released from 2000. New sets were also made using a themed radio control operating system and a Trak-Mat system that sets in Hornby's existing lines used, were customers are encouraged to buy additional track packs, scenery packs, and other scenic materials to create the full printed layout. In 2005, the range revamped due to the 60th Anniversary of The Railway Series and two characters only seen in the book series were introduced, Flying Scotsman and Bear. Several pieces of rolling stock, most seen in Season 8 were also introduced, including a circus series with a total of twelve wagons, as well as three tents and stalls. The sets were redesigned using the regular analogue controllers, and a range of resin buildings seen in the television series designed for adult collectors were introduced. New items were introduced during the next three years to tie in with recent seasons of the television series and the special, The Great Discovery. In 2008 and 2009, new sets were made with the updated Midi-Mat system, replacing the Trak-Mat. From 2010, more items were again discontinuing due to their poor sales. The range was retired in 2014, but was relaunched in December 2015, albeit with only Thomas, Edward, Henry, Gordon, James, and Percy as locos, and limited rolling stock consisting of Troublesome Trucks, Annie and Clarabel, freight wagons, and James and Gordon's coaches. The other parts of the range were not reintroduced due to declining sales. The range was discontinued permanently in 2018 due to changing safety regulations.

The models are designed for somewhat older children than most Thomas toys, as placing them correctly on the rails requires a certain degree of dexterity, and the plastic-bodied rolling stock may break if dropped. However, the level of detail is more basic than the 'real' models produced by the company, with the result that the trains can be handled safely by inexperienced hands without fear of damaging delicate parts.

Other products made by Hornby apart from the O-scale range was a range of clockwork 'Playtrains'. The range first featured Thomas and Percy in sets using 00 track. A new range was then released featuring Thomas, Percy, Toby, Bill and Ben, Annie and Clarabel, and Troublesome Trucks, which ran on red track. The track system also used a playmat similar to a Trak-Mat where additional track and buildings could be placed on the mat illustrations. A battery-powered set featuring Thomas, Annie, Clarabel and Bertie the Bus was also released, which allowed a story recreation of Thomas and Bertie's race. Thomas was unpowered, being pushed along by a motor in Annie.

=== Fisher-Price ===
==== Thomas & Friends Wooden Railway ====
Thomas & Friends Wooden Railway (1992–2017, 2022–), later rebranded as Thomas & Friends Wood (2017–2021), is a wooden railway system designed and created by Learning Curve. It is one of two Wooden Railway lines that feature the characters from Thomas & Friends. The other is BRIO. However, this is the only line to feature characters from The Railway Series.

In 1992, Learning Curve created the line with the help of Roy Wilson. In February 1993, the line was first released during American International Toy Fair. One of the first sets for the line was the 22 piece starter set. This set and many of the earlier sets had generic track until 1995, which is the year that Learning Curve patented the "Clicketyclack" track design.

The models at this time were made from painted wood, with plastic being added for the wheels and faces. Metal was used for the magnets and axles. These models would be upgraded; the wooden smokeboxes were replaced with plastic smokeboxes, and would also include more realistic funnels. These models would not last long, as they would be revamped again in 2002. These models had newer, more detailed faces.

The battery-powered line of characters were first released in the 1990s. The second version of these models got released in the 2000s. Learning Curve created new track in the 2000s, due to a lawsuit, and so that this line of characters could use the track.

Like many other brands, Learning Curve faced a recall around the time of the economic downturn. The models involved in this recall had red or yellow paint, and were sold between January 2005 and June 2007. Tests with these models indicated there was the presence of lead. Hence, there was a risk of lead poisoning.

Learning Curve was also responsible for the creation of the Talking Railway Series in 2008. This series of engines and destinations could interact with each other through gold magnets found on the engines.

In 2009, this line was affected by the takeover of the Thomas franchise by Mattel's preschool division Fisher-Price. Now, this line was creating the new characters from the CGI series, and re-releases of the originals with CGI faces. Learning Curve (RC2) got acquired by Tomy, who continued making the line until they gave up the rights to Fisher-Price.

In 2013, Fisher-Price acquired the Thomas Wooden Railway line from TOMY. The models from TOMY would continue to be made although over time these models began to evolve. They introduced rounder corners to the models, so that children would not injure themselves.

In 2017, the line went through a complete overhaul under the name Thomas & Friends Wood. The engines were made smaller to cut production costs, and the track system was rendered incompatible with the standard wooden track design without the use of adaptors. For a brief time the toys were half-painted, leaving exposed wood in many sections, again to cut production costs. Due to heavy criticism, Fisher-Price resumed fully painting the engines in 2019.

On June 27, 2021, it was announced that Thomas & Friends: Wood will be discontinued, as Mattel had lost money from the line, following the show's cancellation and the 2D series being a standalone series. It was replaced by a revival of the original "Wooden Railway" line. The line features new engine models with more accurate designs, increased levels of detail, and stronger durability. In addition, the older track system was restored; borrowing elements from the traction-rail and Clickety-Clack designs. The revived line was released to outlets such as Amazon and Barnes & Noble in March 2022.

==== Take-n-Play Thomas & Friends ====
Take-n-Play (formerly Take Along) is a series of die-cast 'Thomas' models made by Learning Curve and designed for preschool children. The models have superseded the Ertl die-cast models range, which has now been discontinued. The two ranges are incompatible as the new models use special 'two-way' magnets instead of the hook-and-loop couplers provided on the Ertl models.

First released at the start of 2002, the models are generally much chunkier, and considerably less accurate, than the Ertl range. Many items in the Ertl range were passable as 'scale' models of the TV Series characters, but the Take Along products are much more obviously toys.

The range includes all the major and minor characters from the TV series and Movies, plus Mike, Culdee, and D199 from The Railway Series. The rolling stock models include many of the 'special' (non-speaking) trucks that have featured in single episodes, and the vehicles include the members of The Pack. As well as the individual characters, a number of play-sets have been produced, either containing two or more characters, or a single engine with play scene and DVD. Some specials have been produced with a metallic finish, and a few models are fitted with sound chips and lights.

In 2006, two playsets called Train Yard Set and Working Hard Set were introduced. These were much bigger than other playsets, being more than 1×1 meters. Original sets were less than 30×30 centimeters.

In 2010, Take-Along was bought by Mattel and became a Fisher-Price line, and renamed Take-n-Play. New characters were released and the old models were re-released with upgraded paints and faces.

In 2013, the production of the Take-n-Play models was relocated to Thailand (whereas all prior models were manufactured in China, as were the Ertl range models). Coinciding with the move, further changes were made to the models, including redesigned wheels, updated faces that more closely resemble those of the CGI series rather than the model series, and other additional changes.

In 2017, Mattel retooled the line into Thomas & Friends Adventures. There are characters from Thomas & Friends: Journey Beyond Sodor (2017) and other recent Thomas films in this line as well as the models recycled from Take-n-Play. Some of these are just the Collectable Railway models repackaged. All of these models have hook couplings similar to Mattel's own trains that they made for Hot Wheels and Matchbox. The line was discontinued in December 2018 and was replaced by TrackMaster Push-Along.

==== TrackMaster ====
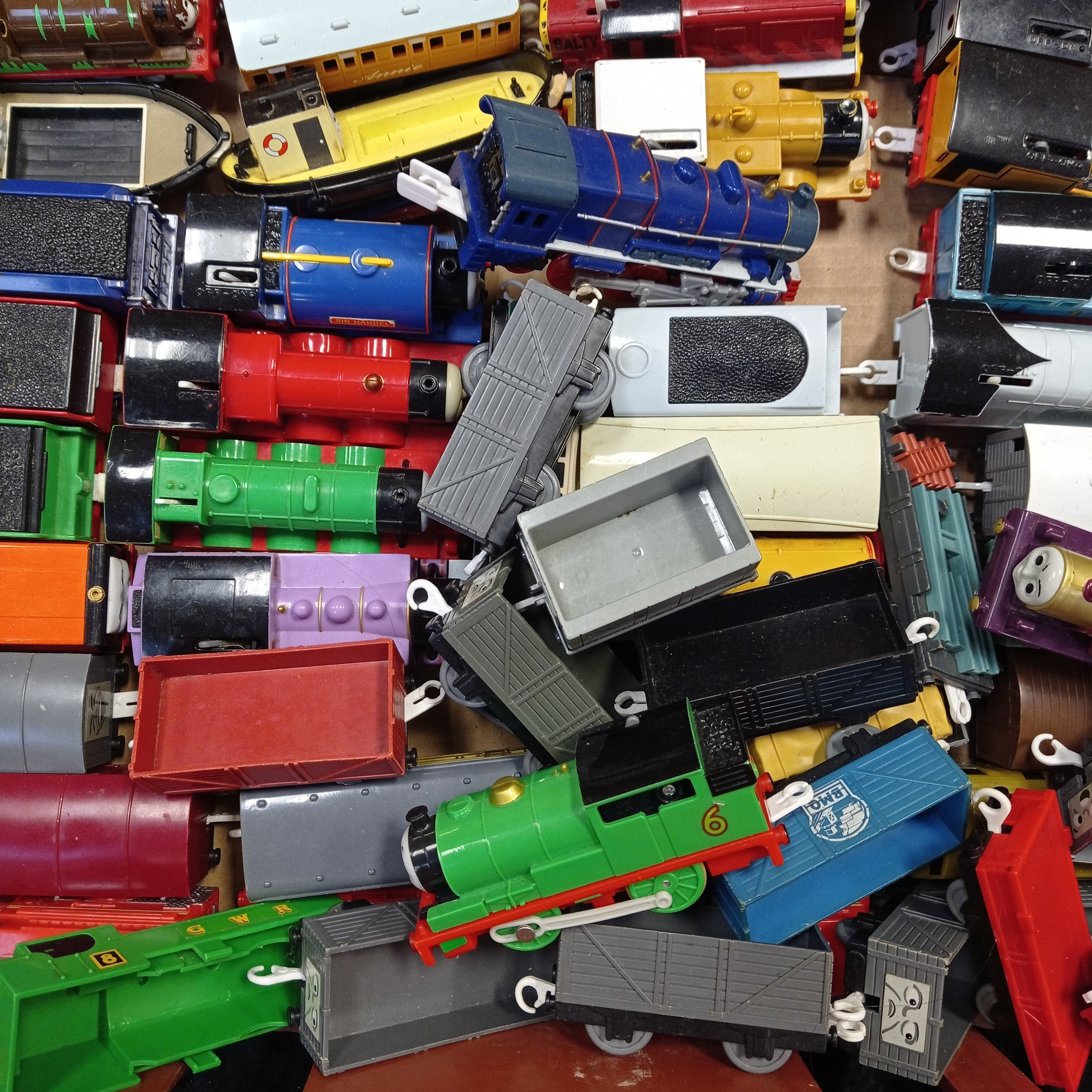
An assortment of Trackmaster/TOMY characters

In 2007, HIT Entertainment's subsidiary HiT Toy Company picked up the license to produce the Thomas Motor Road and Rail range. The TrackMaster (formerly Tomy) engines were compatible with Tomy's Motor Road and Rail merchandise. TrackMaster's light brown colored track was easily connected to the previous blue track from TOMY by track adapters, which were included in every set until new releases after 2008. An innovation in this range was special editions of certain engines, including remote-controlled and face-changing variations. In 2010, the rights were put under the ownership of Fisher-Price.

In 2014, Mattel decided to take TrackMaster and completely reinvent it. The trains from this range would now be faster and be able to go up tall hills. This range also saw the track made more realistic. The coaches and rolling stock did not receive that treatment; they were made smaller so that the engines could go up hills without struggling because of big rolling stock.

==== Motorized ====
Motorized is a battery-operated toy system manufactured by Fisher-Price, Mattel in the US and was launched in 2020. It is a rebrand of the 2014 TrackMaster line and is virtually identical to it, although with new products being released alongside re-released older ones and an aim to be more simplistic with packaging and sets similar to the previous line before it.

==== Capsule Plarail ====
In 1997, Tomy made a range of wind-up models that "have an action when you wind them up". The range was small and included only a few of the 'major' characters.

In 2006, another range was introduced. More characters were modeled than previously, and some had moving side rods. Additional models from the range were released in Japan.

==== Tomix ====
A Tomix model depicting Thomas the Tank Engine with Annie and Clarabel.

From 1998 onwards, a significant range from Tomix has been introduced providing an electric N gauge Thomas system which was still unique in 2007 and which then included 4 locomotives: Thomas, Percy, James and Henry. Some of the rolling stock looked similar to Graham Farish items.

=== Golden Bear ===
==== My First Thomas & Friends ====
My First Thomas & Friends is a range of chunky plastic toys, produced by British toy company Golden Bear Toys.

The range started in 1994 and was advertised for young infants who enjoyed the series. The models were safe for younger children to play with.

The range started with only a dozen or so models, and has now grown to around 40–45, the range was (for a short-lived amount of time) available in America, under the company Tomy. The toys are still available in many good retail toy shops all around the UK, and despite speculation that perhaps the range has discontinued, after the absence of three years without new products; brand new models have started to appear on Amazon.

The range included most of the major and minor characters from the TV series.

Talking My First Thomas & Friends

The talking versions of the My First models were first released in the year 2000. The models are more complex than the basic ones, their eyes move, and they speak familiar phrases from the original stock narrations of Ringo Starr and Michael Angelis.

=== Bandai ===
==== Thomas Engine Collection Series ====
A large number of die-cast vehicles released resembled the "Gold Rail" models made by Ertl. However, this series had more characters, although none from The Railway Series. Most characters from Seasons 1–5 were made. The last new model, to date, is Jack the Frontloader. There have been 4 sets made for this range. Other than this Bandai had made small plastic toys (as big as an index finger) labeled "Pocket Thomas." There is another series where plastic models (as big as the die-casts) are sold mostly at convenience stores along with candy such as mints and feature more minor characters such as the Mailvan.

=== Lionel, LLC ===
In 1993, Lionel Trains USA produced a range of Thomas & Friends models in O-scale for the US and Canada markets. The company previously manufactured Thomas and James models in G gauge but dropped this line in 2001. As of 2013, all the O-scale engines are powered by the LionChief Remote. As of 2018, all of the engines have gained CGI-style faces, with the exceptions of 'Arry and Bert.

=== Bachmann Industries ===
In 2002, Bachmann USA also made their own HO-scale electric Thomas the Tank Engine and Friends range for the US and Canada markets as well. The models are made with new body tools, to resemble the characters in the TV series. So far over two dozen models have been produced, along with character-themed train sets. Unlike Hornby's products, Bachmann's models have moving eyes.

In January 2009, Bachmann announced that, in an agreement with HiT Entertainment, a line of large scale Thomas electric trains will be produced, under the title "Large Scale Thomas & Friends".

In 2015, Bachmann announced a line of Narrow Gauge HOn30-Scale (also known as OO9 in the UK) trains based on characters from the Skarloey Railway.

In 2019, Bachmann announced that the Thomas range will officially see distribution in the European side of the Atlantic, following the permanent discontinuation of Hornby's OO gauge Thomas range.

In 2020, Bachmann introduce a brand new N-Scale Thomas & Friends range, similar to the Tomix N-Scale Thomas & Friends already sold in Japan.

=== Marklin ===
Märklin, a German model train maker, released a limited range of Thomas & Friends merchandise in HO-scale. Because of copyright reasons (using Hornby's toolings), they were only available in Germany, Austria, and Switzerland, but they did leak out to other countries. They are designed for young children as they have metal frames and plastic shells. They are compatible with the rest of the Märklin range, but are extremely basic and have no extra features. They were only released in 2006.

=== Lego Duplo ===
In 2005, Lego introduced the first sets in their Duplo 'Thomas' series. Four sets were made, featuring: James the Red Engine, Thomas the Tank Engine, a Troublesome Truck, Toby the Tram Engine, and Percy the Small Engine. Subsequently, in line with usual Lego practice, new sets had been released each year, featuring different scenes and characters, until Mega Bloks picked up the license in 2010 and have produced Thomas sets of their own.

Duplo is designed for very young children, so the sets have relatively few pieces (between 7 and 62) to assemble.

=== MV Sports ===
In 2006, MV Sports made their own self-assembly Thomas the Tank Engine and Friends engines and buildings. The range consists of the following models:

- Thomas, Toby, and Mavis Three-Pack Set
- Percy Track Set
- James and Station Set
- Edward and Engine Shed Set

=== Mega Bloks ===
In 2009, Mega Bloks made buildable Thomas & Friends models such as Percy, Thomas and Diesel and sets too. This line was ended in 2017.

In 2017, Mega Bloks made larger versions of Diesel, Thomas, Percy, James and a few others in their attempt of "preschoolizing" the toys. They made new sets to go along with these.

== Video games ==
A number of different educational software packages and video games, all based on a 'Thomas' theme, have been released for a variety of different computers.

- Thomas the Tank Engine, or Thomas the Tank Engine & Friends, is a 1990 video game published by Alternative Software for many computers. Players control Thomas the Tank Engine as he takes special trips he has to organize: Take children to the seaside, medicine to the hospital or deliver the mail. Hazards such as dead ends, level crossings, other trains and vehicles impede the player's route.
- Thomas the Tank Engine & Friends is a video game based on Shining Time Station and the Thomas the Tank Engine & Friends television series released in 1993 on Genesis and Super NES. The game was developed for the Super NES by Software Creations and for the Genesis by Malibu Interactive and published by THQ. A version was planned for the original Nintendo Entertainment System but was canceled. A ROM image of the NES version has since been uploaded online.
- Thomas the Tank Engine & Friends Pinball is a pinball-based video game developed by Spidersoft and published by in 1995 by Alternative Software for the Amiga, CD32, and MS-DOS. The game has different boards based on the characters from the series which are Thomas, James, Percy and Toby. The complexity of the tables vary between the 3 skill levels of difficulty with ramps and bumpers. The game also includes a high score table to keep track of player records. Up to 8 players can take turns to play.
- Thomas & Friends: The Great Festival Adventure is a 1999 educational action computer game developed by Mind's Eye Productions and published by Hasbro Interactive for Microsoft Windows. It was released in 1999 and is based on the Thomas & Friends television series. The game features new voices provided by show narrator Michael Angelis in the UK dub and franchise regular Robin Smith in the US dub. It also features music tracks from the first and second series of the show by Mike O'Donnell and Junior Campbell. The game consists of seven mini-games around the island of Sodor that players can play in any order. Some of these minigames are "preparing the rides, sorting the goods coming in for the event, and much more." Allgame gave the game 3.5 out of 5 stars praising the visuals and the activities calling them well done. In the end, they called it an excellent game and one of the better games for young children available to date.
- Thomas & Friends: Trouble on the Tracks is a 2000 educational adventure game developed by Mind's Eye Productions and published by Hasbro Interactive for Windows based on the Thomas & Friends television series. Angelis and Smith returned to narrate and provide all the voices in the UK and US versions respectively. It also features music tracks from the first and second series of the show by O'Donnell and Campbell and some original tracks by Marcus Felding. The game is similar to the previous one, Thomas & Friends: The Great Festival Adventure. The game consists of eight mini-games around the island of Sodor that the player can play in any order. Allgame gave the game 3 out of 5 stars praising the sounds, background music and voice overs however stating the gameplay is short although that it would appeal more to younger players and fans.
- Thomas & Friends Railway Adventures is a 2001 educational adventure game developed by Mind's Eye Productions and published by Infogrames for Windows based on the Thomas & Friends television series. The game featured Angelis, Stephen Donald, Simon Hepworth and 2 unknown people voicing various characters in the UK dub and Smith voicing all the characters in the US dub. Like the previous two titles, the game featured tracks from the first and season series of the show composed by O'Donnell and Campbell while Fleiding return to compose some original tracks for the game. The player controls Thomas in a 3D environment of the island using a special playset attached to the keyboard, where a Throttle can move Thomas forward or backward, a Green lever to change directions, a yellow lever to blow the whistle, and a Thomas button representing Thomas' face will make Thomas talk to the player. The player controls Thomas to do tasks around the Island of Sodor, like helping Bertie take their passengers to their destinations after a break-down, helping Percy deliver coal by repairing tracks from a landslide, search around the island for a lost Mailcar that Diesel has hidden on the island, and help Thomas do very important tasks given from their friends. The player can also explore around the island freely and do some side mini-games like racing with Bertie, pushing Troublesome Trucks, finding Toby in a sidings game, and collecting mailbags dropped from Diesel. There are signs on the side of the track known as a "surprise" according to Thomas where if the player blows the whistle while next to the sign, a clip is shown from the TV series that the player can watch. These clips include the episodes "Tenders and Turntables", "Thomas and Bertie's Great Race", "Put Upon Percy" and "Cranky Bugs".
- Kikansha Thomas – Sodor-tou no Nakama-tachi is a 2001 action-adventure video game published by Tamsoft and released for the Game Boy Color. It was released in 2001 exclusively in Japan and based on the Thomas & Friends television series. The player controls Thomas as they explore the different parts of Sodor. Along riding the track, the player comes across empty spaces where they have to pick the right track piece which fits. As they further explore, the player will meet different characters who will talk with Thomas or might give him a task. The tasks range from a number of mini-games which once completed allow the player to further continue. If the player fails, they must restart the level. There are four levels to start off which are the farm, fields, docks and mountains which the player must complete each one in order. A final level which is the town is unlocked in the end. Other characters encountered are hidden which Thomas must use his whistle to reveal them. The player can unlock small biographies of each character that they encounter.
- Thomas & Friends: Building the New Line is an adventure computer game developed by Stunt Puppy Entertainment, Inc. and published by Infogrames for Windows and Mac OS. It was released in 2002 and is based on the Thomas & Friends television series. The game's narration and character voices were done yet again by Angelis in the UK & Smith in the US as well features music tracks from the first and second series of the show by O'Donnell and Campbell. The player is the new engine driver who has been invited by The Fat Controller to help build the new lines for the railway to run smoothly on Sodor. The player has to create a new track route from one of three settings: farm, quarry or docks. There they can pick to have what sort of layout either a simple loop or figure eight. To start, the player can pick one of four characters available from the series which are Thomas, Edward, James and Percy. Items used to create and customize the track include trees, rocks and other assorted bits depending on the setting you've picked. Once created, the player can control their engine to where they can go. They can also interact with objects including factories and water towers where small tasks are asked to perform. Later, the player has to clean and repair their selected engine followed by decorating them for a photo to be taken which later can be printed off. Allgame reviewed the game.
- Thomas & Friends: Thomas Saves the Day is a point and click adventure computer game developed by Stunt Puppy Entertainment, Inc. and published by Atari Interactive for the PC. Angelis and Smith return once more to provide the game's narration and the character voices in the UK and US dubs respectively. It was released in 2003 and based on the Thomas & Friends television series. The story has the player help Thomas and his friends clean up after a massive storm on Sodor and to get a shipment of Mr. Jolly's Chcoolates to Brendam Docks with help from Edward, Percy, Harvey, Salty, Harold, and Sir Topham Hatt.
- Thomas & Friends: A Day at the Races is a PlayStation 2 game that was released in the European Union and Australia. This game was developed by Broadsword Interactive and published by Blast! Entertainment. This game has a rare version of the theme song from the show.
- Thomas & Friends: Hero of the Rails is a family-oriented adventure and simulation game that was released on June 29, 2010 for the Nintendo Wii and Nintendo DS in Europe, based on the 2009 feature-length special of the same name. The game follows the plot of the special and features activities including racing, shunting, painting and fixing Hero. It was planned to be released in North America, but was cancelled.
- Thomas & Friends: Steaming Around Sodor is a Nintendo 3DS game released on October 2, 2015. In the game, the player helps Thomas and the other engines prepare for a special visit from the Duke and Duchess of Boxford.
- Thomas & Friends: Wonders of Sodor is an open world train simulator video game developed by Dovetail Games. It was released on March 17, 2026 on Steam, Epic Games Store, PlayStation 4, PlayStation 5, Xbox One, Xbox Series X and Series S followed by a Nintendo Switch version on June 9.

=== Mobile apps ===
Mattel partnered with several companies, including Budge Studios and Animoca Brands, to create mobile apps based on Thomas & Friends. In 2010, Callaway Digital Arts created apps based on the brand. By mid-2011, thirteen Thomas apps were available. HiT Entertainment and Mattel both released apps under their own names. During the 75th anniversary press release in 2020, Mattel mentioned an intent for more apps.
