= Monopoly game =

Monopoly game may refer to:

== Games ==
- Monopoly (game), a popular board game created in the early 20th century
- Monopoly (game show), a 1990 American television game show based on the board game
- Monopoly (video game), any one of more than a dozen video game adaptations of the board game
- The Monopoly Game 2, a Japanese video game from 1995 for the Super Famicom
- Monopoly: The Card Game, a card game loosely based on the board game

== Music ==
- Monopoly Game, a 1998 recording by the Toshiko Akiyoshi Jazz Orchestra featuring Lew Tabackin

== See also ==
- Canadian Monopoly
- Hong Kong Monopoly
- McDonald's Monopoly, a sweepstakes advertising promotion of McDonald's restaurants and Hasbro using the theme of the board game
- Monopoly Party, a board-game-styled video game
- Monopoly Junior, a simplified version of the board game Monopoly
- Monopoly Tycoon, a construction and management simulation computer game that uses a city derived from the Monopoly board game
- Monopoly: The Mega Edition, a 2006 variant of the board game
