= The War College: Universal Military Simulator 3 =

1996 video game

- Developer: Intergalactic Development
- Publisher: GameTek
- Platform: MS-DOS
- Release: NA: May 10, 1996
- Genre: Computer wargame

The War College: Universal Military Simulator 3 is a computer wargame developed by Intergalactic Development and published for MS-DOS in 1996 by GameTek. It is the sequel to The Universal Military Simulator and UMS II: Nations at War.

== Gameplay ==
The War College is a computer wargame that simulates four battles from different historical periods: the Battle of Pharsalus, Battle of Antietam, Battle of Austerlitz and Battle of Tannenberg. The game eschews the traditional hex map format in favor of free unit movement based on algorithmic data.

== Reception ==
Reception

Review scores
| Publication | Score |
|---|---|
| PC Gamer (US) | 82% |
| PC Games | C− |
| Computer Game Review | 92/100 |

According to designer Ezra Sidran, The War College's sales were hurt by the closure of the game's publisher. He wrote in 2016, "To this day I have no idea how many units it sold. We never got a royalty statement."

William R. Trotter was largely positive toward the game in his review for PC Gamer US, dubbing it "a mature, deep, thoughtful simulation that embodies a radical departure from the wargaming norm". Barry Brenesal of PC Games was less impressed: "this simulation's sum doesn't live up to the promise of its parts", he argued. In Computer Game Review, Scott Gehrs wrote, "While I cannot say that The War College is a title that everyone will like, I can say that for the serious war strategist or student of military history, The War College is the place to study."
