= Wail of the Banshee =

Wail of the Banshee is a seven-part children's fantasy drama series from 16 March to 11 May 1992 broadcast on CITV, and made by Central Television.

== Plot ==
Centuries ago, an alien race known as the Lamia arrived on Earth, who viewed humanity as test subjects. The literal translation of their name for humans is lab rats.

They were named Banshee because of the sound their spacecraft made. When hovering they emit a low throbbing sound akin to baaaan-baaaan-baaaan, and when they take off they emit a sound like a sheeeeee. Hence the name Baaan-sheee.

The Lamia has an ability which involves them emitting ultra-high-frequency sound from their throats, which disorients and hurts any humans who hear it, allowing them to be taken on board the ships without resistance for experimentation. It is for this reason that the 'wail of the Banshee' is associated with death.

== Cast ==
- Susie Blake - Fay Morgan (Morgan le Fay)
- Michael Angelis - Merlin
- Edward Hardman - Jason
- Greg Chisholm - Matt
- Debbie Doolin - Diz
- Ellen-Gayle Harewood - Jubilee
- David Barber - Boggart
- Allan Corduner - Death
