= Monopoly Here and Now (video game) =

2006 video game

- Developers: Glu Mobile (mobile); Encore Software (pc); EA Mobile, Hasbro (iOS)
- Series: Monopoly
- Platforms: Mobile, Windows, iOS, Android
- Release: Mobile; October 1, 2006; Windows; February 23, 2007 iOS; November 20, 2008

Monopoly Here and Now is a video game adaptation of the board game of the same name, which itself is a version of the classic board game Monopoly. It was originally developed by Glu Mobile for the mobile market in 2006. A PC version was created by Encore Software for the Windows XP/Vista in 2007. It was then released for the iOS as Monopoly Here & Now: The World Edition. It was developed by EA Mobile and Hasbro. The game marked the franchise's debut into the iOS market, and was launched on November 20, 2008. The game was also scheduled for release on Nokia N-Gage. The game was added to the Pogo.com platform in 2009.

== Development, iOS version ==
Adam Sussman, VP Publishing Americas and Asia for EA Mobile, commented upon the game's announcement: "Our alliance with Hasbro continues to benefit EA Mobile customers with our ability to bring favorite popular board game properties to the mobile platform". The game was part of an expansion in the Spring of 2008, along with Trivial Pursuit, Risk, and Yahtzee Adventures, which saw new twists on classic Hasbro titles.

== Commercial performance ==
The game was reported to be within the AppStore list of Top 100 downloads on December 2, 2009, December 9, 2009, December 11, 2009, December 13, 2009, December 15, 2009, and February 10, 2010. The game was among the top ten of Pogo.com games, in terms of worldwide visitors and minutes played.

== Critical reception ==
Levi Buchanan of IGN wrote about the 2006 version developed by Glu Mobile, that the game's cosmetic changes from the original were "fun", but he did not see a concrete reason for choosing this version over the classic edition. George Roush from IGN commented that the game was good, despite the disappointing AI and die physics. Slide To Play thought the game was a "solid" adaptation of the board game, and thought it was a "bargain" considering the low price tag. Gadget Review thought the game was a "waste of money". 148Apps disliked the auto-auction feature, though liked the game's customisability.
