= The Monopoly Game 2 =

1995 video game

- Japanese cover art
- Developer: Tomcat System
- Publisher: Tomy
- Composer: Yukitsuna Sasaki
- Series: Monopoly
- Platform: Super Famicom
- Release: JP: 31 March 1995
- Genres: Strategy, board game
- Modes: Single-player, multiplayer

The Monopoly Game 2 (ザ・モノポリーゲーム 2, Za Monopori Gemu 2) is a 1995 video game developed by Tomcat System and published by Tomy for the Super Famicom. It was not released outside of Japan.

This game is the sequel to a 1993 Super Famicom game called Monopoly, which was published by Tomy and developed by Ape Inc. and CreamSoft (not to be confused with the 1991 Monopoly game by Sculptured Software). It was likewise Japan only.

Aside from co-developing the game, Ape also wrote a complete guidebook to it with rules and tactics. It was released in May 1995 by book publishing company Aspect (not to be confused with the game development company Aspect).

== Reception ==
On release, Famicom Tsūshin gave the game 30 points out of 40.
