= Monopoly (2010 video game) =

2010 video game

- Developer(s): Electronic Arts
- Publisher(s): Electronic Arts
- Series: Monopoly
- Platform(s): Nintendo DS
- Release: October 26, 2010
- Genre(s): Digital board game
- Mode(s): Single-player, multiplayer

Monopoly is a digital version of the board game Monopoly developed and published by Electronic Arts. It was released on October 26, 2010, for Nintendo DS.

== Reception ==
Reception

Review scores
Publication	Score
IGN	6.5/10
Jeuxvideo.com	11/20

The game received average reviews from critics.

Colin Moriarty of IGN rated the game 6.5/10, criticizing it for having "very few bells and whistles". While saying that it translated the board game successfully into video game form, he called it "watered-down and vanilla" and said that its lack of features "borders on laziness". He summed up his thoughts as saying that it should only be used where it was impractical to set up a physical board game.

Rivaol of Jeuxvideo.com rated the game 11/20, calling it overly faithful to the board game version and saying that the real-life version was much more enjoyable. They also criticized the fact that each player in local multiplayer required a copy of the game. Nintendo Gamer rated the game 71/100, calling it a "decent digital board game" in their review.
