= Monopoly (1988 video game) =

- Developer(s): Nexa
- Publisher(s): Sega
- Series: Monopoly
- Platform(s): Master System
- Release: NA: September 1988; EU: October 1988
- Genre(s): Strategy, board game
- Mode(s): Single-player, multiplayer

Monopoly is a Master System video game based on the board game Monopoly, released in 1988. Developed by American studio Nexa Corporation and published by Sega, this title was one of many inspired by the property. According to Game Freaks 365, the game was "one of the first real boardgames that was programmed" into a video game.

== Gameplay ==
The game contains very similar gameplay to the board game it is based on, with various physical tasks being replaced by automation and digital representations. Up to ten players can join in the game.

== Development ==
For some time, Sega had wanted the license rights to Monopoly. Parker Brothers gave them the license in 1987 via Tonka. The idea was to adapt popular board games to increase the Master System's place in the United States. Due to the lack of familiarity with American board games in Japan, American developers were favored to develop the game. Sega turned their attention to Nexa, which was based in San Francisco.

After three months of development, the team was behind schedule, so Nexa hired two programmers, Kevin Seghetti and Lawrence Statton, for $10,500 each. Due to the poor quality of the existing source code, Seghetti and Statton chose to start from scratch. Use of the inaccurate and buggy Sega Graphic Tool made it difficult to implement the game graphics. In addition, there was a lack of blank EPROMs, forcing the two programmers to wait and erase used ones to test their changes. With a lot of time spent improving the game's graphic and programming quality, the game was finished six months later which was three months after Sega's intended deadline. The initial 50,000 cartridges are misspelled "Mono Poly" on the cartridge label, in addition to having a secret credits menu subsequently removed in later releases.

== Reception ==
Jonathan Sutyak of Allgame deemed the video game a "perfect translation" of the board game, praising the detailed graphics while commenting on the unforgiving AI. ACE Magazine recommended the title due to it being an adaptation of a popular and fun board game, though noted that the small digital representation of the board meant it could be challenging to see clearly who owns which properties and how many houses/hotels they have. The Video Game Critic thought the game was "respectable" as a single-player game with computer opponents, but felt that it didn't replace the board game when it comes to multiplayer human play. 1UP! said the game's AI had "unbearable stupidity", though the graphics were impressive for its age. Game Freaks 365 described the game's sound effects as "terrible", and wrote that the gameplay didn't offer anything that the player couldn't get from the board game; the site also negatively compared it to the NES version released in 1991.
