= UMS II: Nations at War =

1990 video game

- Developer: MicroProse
- Publisher: MicroProse
- Designer: Ezra Sidran
- Platforms: Amiga, Atari ST, MS-DOS, Classic Mac OS
- Release: 1990: MS-DOS, ST; 1991: Amiga, Mac
- Genre: Computer wargame

UMS II: Nations at War is a computer wargame developed and published by MicroProse. It was released in 1990 for MS-DOS and Atari ST, then in 1991 for Amiga and Classic Mac OS. UMS II: Nations at War is a sequel to the computer wargame The Universal Military Simulator.

== Gameplay ==
UMS II has a strategic emphasis that includes nation management, weather systems, and naval and orbital operations as well as expanded historical scenarios.

== Reception ==
According to designer Ezra Sidran, UMS II was a commercial success.

M. Evan Brooks reviewed the game for Computer Gaming World, and stated that "Somewhere, there is a game in UMS II — the difficulty lies in ferreting it out."

Computer Gaming World's 1993 wargame survey gave U.M.S. II two-plus stars. A 1994 survey of wargames offered it the same rating.

A review by Neil Jackson in ST Format magazine gave it a grade of 87%, writing, "Despite its graphical and musical shortcomings this game is marvelous. The depth of detail in the combat systems is phenomenal," adding, "UMS II doesn't set out to amaze you with displays of techno wizardry; it's there to stretch your imagination and provide a basis for you to live out your military dreams (or nightmares). Without doubt there's no other program that even comes close to achieving this." In 1993 a bundle called "The Complete Universal Military Simulator" was released that included the original game, the "Nations at War" sequel, and a "Planet Editor" that let users design planets, weather systems, nations, AIs, event effects, and scenarios as well as unit types and armies. Reviewing the package in Amiga Format, Richard Jones gave it a rating of 74%, writing that it wasn't recommended for "frivolous gamers after a quick thrill", but "is a must for the serious war gamer."

In 1996, Computer Gaming World declared UMS II: Nations at War the 8th-worst computer game ever released.
