= Monopoly (1997 video game) =

- North American box art
- Developer: Gremlin Interactive
- Publisher: Hasbro Interactive
- Series: Monopoly
- Platform: PlayStation
- Release: NA: October 31, 1997; EU: November 6, 1997; JP: January 8, 1998; JP: November 12, 1998 (Special Price)
- Genres: Strategy, board game

Monopoly is a PlayStation video game based on the board game Monopoly, released on November 6, 1997. Developed by Gremlin Interactive and published by Hasbro Interactive, this title was one of many inspired by the property. Despite using the same box art as the 1995 PC version of Monopoly, it is not the same game.

== Gameplay ==
The game contains very similar gameplay to the board game it is based on, with various physical tasks being replaced by automation and digital representations.

== Critical reception ==
Reception

Review scores
Publication	Score
AllGame	2/5
Electronic Gaming Monthly	6.875/10
GameSpot	4.2/10
IGN	3/10
GameZilla	73/100

Reviews for the game ranged from middling to mediocre. As usual for Monopoly, many critics questioned whether a video game adaptation has any value, since the original board game is more naturally sociable, has the fun and tangibility of physical elements, and sells for a fraction of the price. Some of the more common criticisms of this specific adaptation were the clunky and confusing menu system and the incessantly looping background music, while the ability to customize the game with popular unofficial rules like Free Parking jackpot was widely praised. Electronic Gaming Monthly's review team all felt that while it was a relatively strong console version of the game, there was still no reason to get it over the board game, remarking that the full motion video (FMV) sequences are cute but quickly get old. GamePro criticized that the FMV sequences only slow the pace of the game, but still concluded it to be an "enjoyable and error-free" adaptation of the board game. (Note: GamePro scored Monopoly 3.5/5 for graphics, 2.5/5 for sound, 4.0/5 for control, and 3.0/5 for fun factor.)

Absolute PlayStation said the game's graphics were "tastefully executed", the board itself was "accurately represented", and that some of the pictorial representations of properties were "humorous". Game Revolution described it as a "winner" and "solid", despite not being particularly revolutionary. Mark Skorup of Gamezilla said the title would appeal to lovers of the Monopoly concept, but didn't enjoy cleaning up the mess after a round of the board game. GameSpot reviewer Josh Smith wrote that the title is confusing and unexciting since the display fails to show pertinent information such as which properties are owned by who and which are mortgaged, as well as lacking a satisfying visual payoff for when an opponent is forced to sell houses and mortgage properties. Adam Douglas of IGN also thought the display often failed to provide important information, but considered the game's key weakness to be the poor A.I. He pointed out that the majority of the time, human players can buy a property for less than half of its price by opting to bid on it rather than buy outright, while A.I. players will nearly always pay full price.

In a retrospective review, Mark Kanarick of Allgame said this adaption of the board game can induce boredom due to the drawn-out animations and the difficulty of navigating through the menus for actions. He also found the A.I. was unreasonable when it came to trades, repeatedly making offers that no intelligent person would even consider and consistently turning down fair offers from the player.
