= Monopole =

Monopole may refer to:

- Magnetic monopole, or Dirac monopole, a hypothetical particle that may be loosely described as a magnet with only one pole
- Monopole (company), former French manufacturing company that produced parts for automobile engines
- Monopole (mathematics), a connection over a principal bundle G with a section (the Higgs field) of the associated adjoint bundle
- Monopole, the first term in a multipole expansion
- Monopole (wine), an appellation owned by only one winery
- Monopole (album), a 2011 album by White Town
- Monopole antenna, a radio antenna that replaces half of a dipole antenna with a ground plane at right-angles to the remaining half
- Monopole, a tubular self-supporting telecommunications mast
- The Monopole, a bar in Plattsburgh, NY
- Établissements Monopole, a French auto parts manufacturer, racing car builder and racing team.

== See also ==
- Dipole, a particle with a north and south pole
- Dyon, a particle with electric and magnetic charge
- Instanton, a class of field solutions that includes monopoles
- Monomial, a polynomial which has only one term
- Monopoly (disambiguation)
- Seiberg-Witten monopole, a solution of the Seiberg-Witten equations
- 't Hooft–Polyakov monopole, analogous to Dirac monopole, but without singularities
- Wu–Yang monopole, a monopole solution of Yang-Mills equations
