= Big Bang (video game) =

1988 video game

- Developer: Oxford Mobius
- Publisher: Zortech
- Platform: MS-DOS
- Release: August 1988
- Genre: Stock market simulator
- Mode: Single-player

Big Bang is a 1988 stock market simulator video game developed by Oxford Mobius and published by Zortech for MS-DOS.

== Gameplay ==
Big Bang is a stock market simulator and features 100 companies on the stock exchange.

== Publication history ==
Big Bang was released in August 1988, the first game from software publisher Zortech.

== Reception ==
Reception

Review scores
Publication	Score
ACE	773
The Games Machine (UK)	88%
PC Leisure	2/5

John Harrington reviewed Big Bang for Games International magazine, and gave it 3 stars out of 5, and stated that "If I had to sum up Big Bang in just one sentence I would describe it as stimulating, educational but not addictive."

The Games Machine praised the game booklet and felt that players would feel a "wide range of emotions" as their companies gain and lose value.

Rod Lawton for ACE complimented the game, saying "if you've got any entrepreneurial blood in you at all you'll be hooked".

Rob Murray from The Daily Telegraph commended the graphic display, and felt that "Much thought has gone into the program".

PC Leisure called Big Bang "[...] initially compelling, but ultimately pointless, exercise."
