= Monopoly Star Wars =

1997 video game

- Developer: Artech Studios
- Publisher: Hasbro Interactive
- Series: Monopoly; Star Wars
- Platform: Microsoft Windows
- Release: October 21, 1997
- Genres: Strategy, board game

Monopoly Star Wars is the 1997 Monopoly Star Wars video game based on the board game and set in the Star Wars fictional universe. It is one of many Monopoly video game adaptions. The game was developed by Artech Studios and published by Hasbro Interactive. It was released exclusively for Microsoft Windows computers. The game employs the same basic ruleset of traditional Monopoly gameplay, but the Star Wars theme includes famous characters and locales in place of the original game pieces and properties.

Monopoly Star Wars received mixed reviews upon its release. It won the 1998 Software Publishers Association Award for "Best Use of Visual Arts in Multimedia". The multimedia, from full-motion videos to 3D animations were generally praised, but also caused criticism due to slowing the pace of the game. A PlayStation version of the game was announced at E3 1997, but was soon canceled for unknown reasons.

== Gameplay ==
After a player rolls their turn, the camera angle changes to a side-view perspective. Once the character lands on the appropriate spot a FMV clip plays.

The gameplay closely resembles that of the original source material. Players begin by selecting a game piece, each modeled after famous Star Wars characters. Playable characters consist of Han Solo, Princess Leia, Luke Skywalker, R2-D2, Chewbacca, Darth Vader, Boba Fett and Stormtrooper. Whilst the game pieces appear to be cast metal during piece selection, during gameplay they are fully animated and are textured to look like their film counterparts. Players can choose up to four players, with up to three AI players if a person wishes to play solo. Several options allow players to customize the game to their preferences. C-3PO serves as narrator for the game, voiced by Anthony Daniels.

After character selection, play begins with a perspective view of the board, with a starship representing each player flanking each side. These starships display a player's current funds and properties available, and also have an identical character piece attached to the side of the ship. Traditional Monopoly properties are replaced with various Star Wars locales, whilst corner spaces such as Free Parking are kept the same. Instead of building houses and hotels, players accumulate starports. Once a player rolls their turn, the camera shifts to a side-view perspective. This sequence contains animation and clips from the films, which play out when players land on their designated space. Players also had the option to compete in multiplayer LAN games, and observe such games through Microsoft's Internet Gaming Zone, through agreements with Microsoft and Sony Online Entertainment. Zone Support for CD-ROM games ceased on June 19, 2006. GameRanger has since enabled support for it, reviving its multiplayer functionality.

== Development ==
Previously, Hasbro had created a board game version of Star Wars Monopoly, which has sold very well; 1997 was the year of a Special Edition version of the Star Wars original trilogy, so it was decided to release a video game version for the Christmas season, to build on the Monopoly franchise. Programmer Alexander G. M. Smith was in charge of software design for the rules engine. The 3D crew produced a sizzle reel to show Hasbro, and the project was approved. Anthony Daniels, who portrays the droid C3PO in the Star Wars films, contributed his writing skills to the game. During the development process, the "simple but effective dialog boxes and 2D board were replaced by fancy animations, sound effects, and speech". Due to the rushed development toward the end, certain features such as a user interface for trading immunities and futures was left out, while a Japanese version of the title was postponed. The game was officially finished on October 18, 1997. A PlayStation version of the game was announced at E3 1997, but was soon canceled for unknown reasons. This version would allow players to control characters freely.

Upon the title's announcement, Jack Sorensen, president of LucasArts, explained "the Star Wars franchise will expand to a much broader audience who will now have an opportunity to experience two cultural icons in a whole new way." Meanwhile, Hasbro Interactive President Tom Dusenberry commented that "both of these entertainment properties are so ingrained in our culture..together they create an even bigger, more thrilling entertainment experience". The game was officially previewed at the 1997 Children's Interactive Expo. Hasbro Interactive launched a companion website for the game in October–November 1997.

== Reception ==
Reception

Review scores
Publication	Score
AllGame	3.75/5 stars
GameSpot	6.1/10
PC Gamer (US)	68%
The Adrenaline Vault	7/10
Computer Games Magazine	3.5/5 stars
Computer Gaming World	4/10

Monopoly Star Wars received mixed reviews upon its release. It won the 1998 Software Publishers Association Award for "Best Use of Visual Arts in Multimedia". It made Eurogamer's December 2016 list of notable Star Wars spinoffs.

Nick Smith of AllGame liked that the game did more than simply slap the Star Wars name on a Monopoly game; rather the design authentically incorporate aspects of the Star Wars universe. Similarly, The Adrenaline Vault's Jim Brambaugh noted the game's "authenticity", noting the potential for a quick cash-in through the merging of the popular Star Wars and Monopoly franchises. Walter Morbeck of GameSpot thought the melding of the two properties was a good idea, but that the resulting game was "somewhat pointless". The Boston Globe's Kathy McCabe thought the endeavour "married tradition and pop culture". Robin Ray of The Boston Herald deemed the game "marvelous". The Cincinnati Post's Pam Gleichman said aspects of the game were "classic" and "stunning".

Cody Williamson of PC Gamer praised the multimedia aspects of the game, from full-motion videos to "luscious 3D animation as the players jump, duck, and somersault from space to space". However Williamson noted that this slows the pace of the game, and ultimately he turned many multimedia features off, which left him with little change from a standard Monopoly game. Ultimately he felt that most would prefer "gathering around the dining room table for a good, old-fashioned board game".
