= Monopol Hotel, Katowice =

Monopol Hotel
- Hotel Monopol
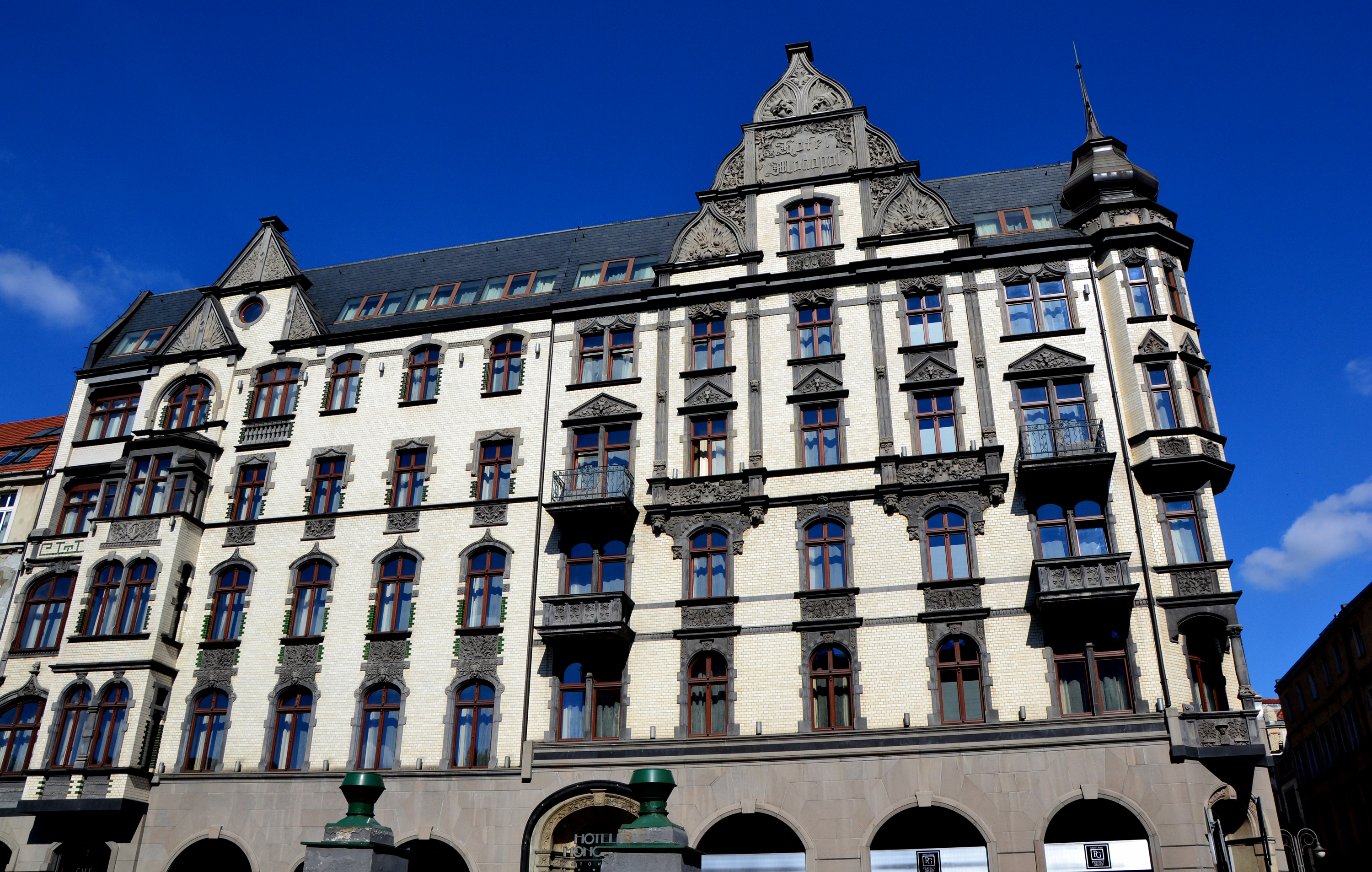
- Monopol Hotel, Katowice, 2012
- Interactive map of the Monopol Hotel area

General information
- Type: hotel
- Architectural style: Eclecticism
- Location: ul. Dworcowa 5, Katowice, Poland
- Coordinates: 50.3°N 19°E
- Completed: 1900
- Opened: 1902
- Affiliation: Likus Hotele & Restauracje

Design and construction
- Architect: Ludwik Goldstein

Other information
- Number of rooms: 108

Website
- monopolkatowice.hotel.com.pl/hotel-monopol-katowice

The Monopol Hotel is a historic five star hotel in Katowice, Silesian Voivodeship, Poland at Dworcowa Street 5, across from the central train station.

== History ==
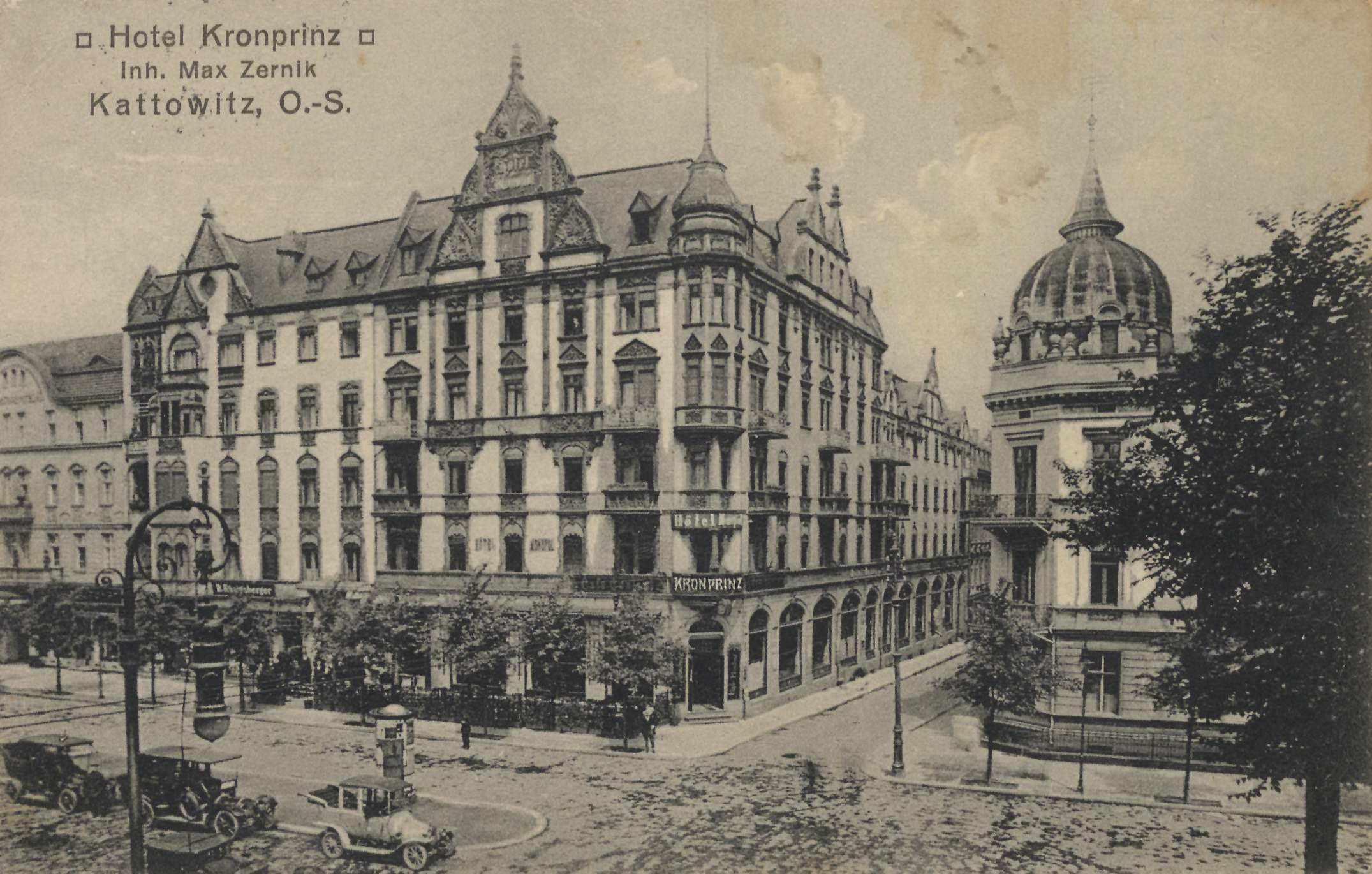
Hotel Kronprinz, 1917

The Hotel Kronprinz was built from 1900-1902, in what was then the city of Kattowitz, in Germany. It was constructed in the eclectic style with elements of Art Nouveau and Gothic Revival architecture on the site of former Cafe Central. It was designed by architect Ludwik Goldstein and opened in 1902. Its first owner was Arnold Lustig.

After WWI, the city and region were ceded to Poland, and the hotel became the Hotel Monopol. In the 1930s, it housed an office of the Orbis travel agency, restaurants, cafes, hairdersser's studio as well as the Kaftal lottery hall. During World War II, the hotel was commandeered by the occupying Germans. After the war, the hotel was operated by Orbis as the Hotel Orbis Monopol and was the seat of such institutions as PKO Bank Polski and Polish Press Agency. At the beginning of 21st century, the hotel was renovated and in 2007 it acquired the five star status. Today it is part of the Likus Hotele & Restauracje group which belongs to the Likus family of hoteliers who also manage luxury hotels in Kraków, Łódź and Wrocław.

== Notable guests ==
Among the prominent guests of the hotel are Jan Kiepura, Arthur Rubinstein, Josephine Baker, Karol Szymanowski, Eugeniusz Bodo, Marta Eggerth, Deep Purple, Woody Allen, David Beckham and Paris Hilton. In 2012, the England national football team as well as the Portugal national football team stayed at the hotel during the UEFA Euro 2012.

== See also ==
- Monopol Hotel, Wrocław
