= Herbert (video game) =

1988 video game

- Developers: Ralf Kothe; Armin Stürmer
- Publisher: AMC Verlag
- Platform: Atari 8-bit
- Release: 1988
- Genre: Platform
- Modes: Single-player, two players independently

Herbert is a horizontally-scrolling platform game released for the Atari 8-bit computers in 1988 by AMC Verlag. A sequel, Herbert II, was released in 1989.

== Gameplay ==
A fish guards the lake

The game world is shown from a side view and scrolls horizontally. The objective is to traverse 20 levels with one or two ducks (namely Herbert and his friend Oscar) to liberate his girlfriend. Herbert can walk, run, swim, and flap. He can lay an egg in a nest turning up once in a while and receives an extra life, and three times a level it is possible to trigger invulnerability for some seconds. Enemies are, among others, a witch, a sword fighter, thorns on bushes or carnivorous plants. To complete a level, Herbert has to collect gems and to reach the exit on the right within a time limit. There are storable best times for each level and a high score list.

A level is a half screen high and about six screens wide.

== Reception ==
In Germany, Herbert received good reviews, among others 91% in the Compy-Shop-Magazin and a very positive review in the Atari Magazin. It was one year in the Readers Top Ten of the Atari Magazin and achieved place 1 for three times. Outside Germany, the games are hardly known.

== Legacy ==
The games were released as freeware in October 2003.
