= Monopoly (2000 video game) =

- Developer: Artech Studios
- Publishers: Windows; Hasbro Interactive; Macintosh; MacSoft
- Series: Monopoly
- Platforms: Windows, Macintosh
- Release: Windows; 1999; Macintosh; 2000
- Genres: Strategy, board game

Monopoly is a 1999 computer game based on the board game Monopoly, released for Microsoft Windows and Macintosh. Developed by Artech Studios, it was published by Hasbro Interactive, Inc. for Windows and MacSoft for the Mac. This title was one of many inspired by the property-dealing board game. It uses the same box art as a 1998 reissue of the 1995 Monopoly PC game. This game proved to be popular and was re-released as Monopoly New Edition (also known as Monopoly 3) on September 30, 2002, published by Infogrames. The only major difference between this game and its re-release was the absence of the board editor in Monopoly 3.

== Gameplay ==
The game contains very similar gameplay to the board game it is based on, with various physical tasks being replaced by automation and digital representations. It features a 1920s-style theme called "Monopoly Song".

== Critical reception ==
Bill Stiteler of AppleLinks.com praised the game's customisation options, and ability to accommodate player-player and player-NPC games, though criticised its computer-animated graphics and voiceovers. Mac Gamer reviewer Danilo Campos thought it was a solid adaption of the board game, but that it did not make the physical version obsolete. Richard Hallas of Inside Mac Games described the game's graphics as "spectacular", though noted the AI can sometimes interrupt a human player's move by making trades and offers.

Meristation said Monopoly New Edition praised the interface and customisation while describing the artificial intelligence as "artificial obstinacy". Jeuxvideo.com thought the graphics were "simple", the gameplay "lacked originality", its replay value was "limited", and the music was mostly "repetitive". Computer Shopper said the title had the perfect mix of 3D graphics, animation, and sound. Dan Adams of IGN wrote that the game lacked in imagination and creativity. Game Over Online disliked the realistic looking design to the game.
