= The Universal Military Simulator =

1987 video game

- Publisher: Rainbird Software
- Platforms: Atari ST, Amiga, MS-DOS, Classic Mac OS
- Release: 1987: Mac, MS-DOS; 1988: Amiga, ST
- Genre: Computer wargame

The Universal Military Simulator is a computer wargame published by Rainbird Software in 1987 for Classic Mac OS and MS-DOS. Atari ST and Amiga versions followed in 1988. The game was created by Ezra Sidran, and the MS-DOS and Amiga pots were done by Ed Isenberg. There are two sequels: UMS II: Nations at War and The War College: Universal Military Simulator 3.

== Gameplay ==
The Universal Military Simulator is a computer wargame which allows players to construct armies and battlefields, using three-dimensional terrain to place features such as towns and hills. Players can reenact historical battles including Hastings, Gettysburg, Waterloo, Arbela, and Marston Moor. The player can zoom in to view specific combat units to plan strategy. The player has the option to play against a human opponent.

== Reception ==
According to designer Ezra Sidran, The Universal Military Simulator was a commercial success, with sales of "about 128,000 units".

M. Evan Brooks reviewed the game for Computer Gaming World, and stated that "Overall, UMS is impressive, but its flaws are apparent. If you are interested in creating your own battles, then UMS is highly recommended. On the other hand, if you desire to learn accurate lessons from military history, then UMS may be a shade too general."

The game was reviewed in 1988 in Dragon #137 by Hartley, Patricia, and Kirk Lesser in "The Role of Computers" column. The reviewers gave the game 4 out of 5 stars. In 1990 Computer Gaming World gave the game two-plus stars out of five, stating "A visual feast, but a playable desert, U.M.S. is incorrect on two counts—it is neither universal nor a simulator". The magazine cited as weaknesses the lack of navies, awkward user interface, and a Battle of Waterloo scenario that completely omitted the Prussians. In 1993 two surveys of wargames in the magazine gave it one-plus stars and two stars, respectively. A 1994 survey of wargames with modern settings gave the game two stars, reporting that the game designer offered "superb customer support" when the publisher did not.

In 1993 a bundle called "The Complete Universal Military Simulator" was released that included the original game, the "Nations at War" sequel, and a "Planet Editor" that let users design planets, weather systems, nations, AIs, event effects, and scenarios as well as unit types and armies. Reviewing the package in Amiga Format, Richard Jones gave it a rating of 74%, writing that it wasn't recommended for "frivolous gamers after a quick thrill", but "is a must for the serious war gamer."
