= Monopol Hotel =

Coordinates: 51°06′22″N 17°01′51″E

- Hotel Monopol we Wrocławiu
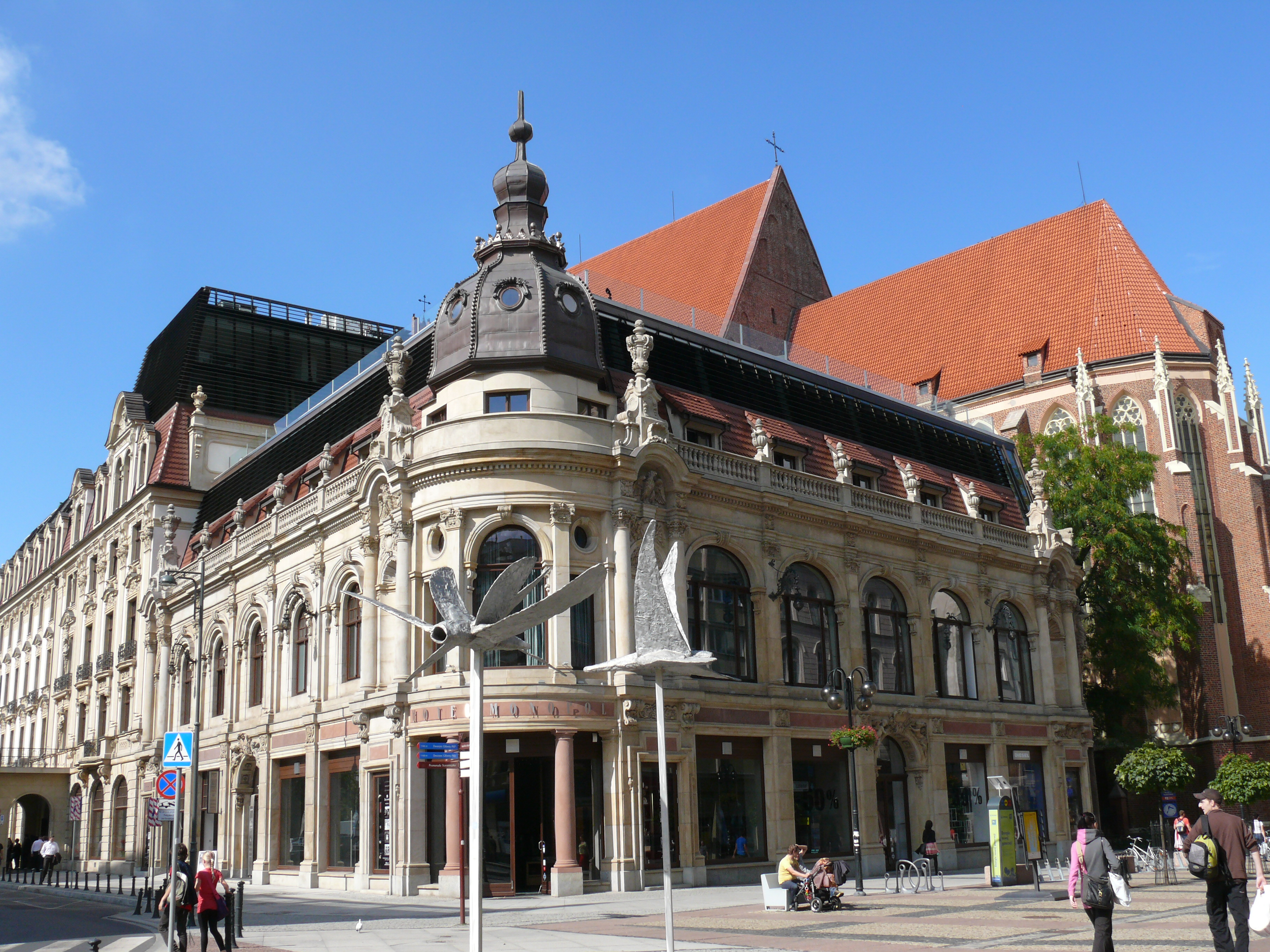
- View of the hotel from Świdnicka Street
- Interactive map of the Monopol Hotel area

General information
- Type: hotel
- Location: ul. Heleny Modrzejewskiej 2, Wrocław, Poland
- Opened: 1892
- Affiliation: Likus Hotele & Restauracje

Design and construction
- Architect: Karl Grosser

Other information
- Number of rooms: 121

Website
- monopolwroclaw.hotel.com.pl/hotel-monopol-wroclaw

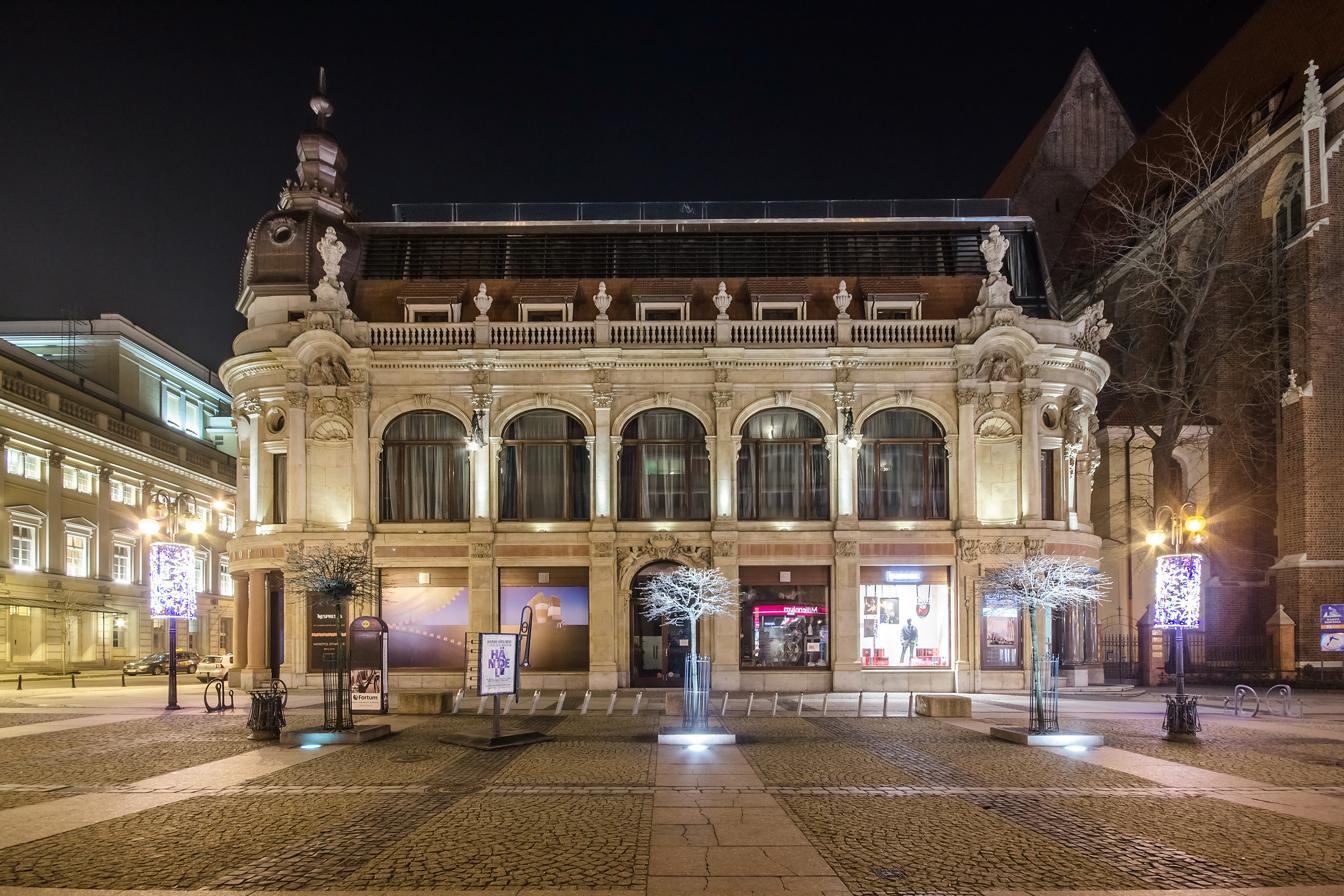
Night view of the hotel

The Monopol Hotel is a historic five-star hotel located at Helena Modrzejewska Street, Wrocław, Lower Silesia, Poland.

== History ==
It was built in 1892 in what was then Breslau, Germany, in Art Nouveau/Neo-Baroque style on the site of the graveyard of St Dorothy's Church. The graveyard had been converted into a jail in 1817. The plot was bought near the end of the 19th century for 600 000 marks by Breslau's Jews - banker Wallenberg Pachaly and architect Karl Grosser, who built a trade house and hotel in which there were 69 rooms, including 21 single occupation rooms, 46 double occupation and 2 apartments. Room size ran from 10 to 36 square metres (110 to 390 sq ft) and according to 19th century standards were luxurious. It was fondly christened "the pearl of Lower Silesia" (die Perle Niederschlesiens).

Famous patrons of the hotel during the German era included Gerhart Hauptmann. The balcony above the main entrance was purposely built in 1937 to coincide with Hitler's visit to Breslau, who gave a speech from said balcony the following year on the occasion of the German Gymnastics and Sports Festival. Singer Jan Kiepura also appeared on the same balcony after the war to sing for a crowd of people gathered in front of the hotel.

The hotel's in-house department store was located at the corner of Świdnicka and Modrzejewskiej Streets (formerly Schweidnitzerstraße and Agnes-Sorma-Straße respectively). During the last months of World War II it was significantly damaged so that it was rebuilt only in 1961 and became an exclusive cafe "Monopol". At the end of the 20th century it was closed and commercial functions were restored in the building.

The hotel building itself survived the war without significant damage. Following the transfer of Breslau to Poland in 1945, the hotel hosted the World Congress of Intellectuals during the Exhibition of the Recovered Territories in 1948 with guests such as Pablo Picasso, Irène Joliot-Curie, Ilya Ehrenburg, Jorge Amado and Mikhail Sholokhov. Other prominent guests included Marlene Dietrich, Zbigniew Cybulski and Jerzy Grotowski.

The hotel provided setting for a number of films including Andrzej Wajda's Ashes and Diamonds, Wojciech Has's The Doll as well as a popular TV show More Than Life at Stake.

In 1984 the building was entered into Wrocław's register of monuments. The façade was given a facelift in 2008. Today the Monopol Hotel has two restaurants (one Polish and the other Mediterranean), a spa and wellness club and organizes conferences and banquets. During Euro 2012 it hosted the Czech national team.

== See also ==
- Monopol Hotel, Katowice
