= Super Bowl Sunday (video game) =

1985 video game

- Publisher: The Avalon Hill Game Company
- Platforms: Apple II, Commodore 64, IBM PC
- Release: 1985
- Genre: Sports

Super Bowl Sunday is a 1985 video game published by The Avalon Hill Game Company.

== Gameplay ==
Super Bowl Sunday is a game in which American football is simulated in a strategy game based on statistics.

== Reception ==
Wyatt Lee reviewed the game for Computer Gaming World, and wrote that "the game is worth playing and offers realistic results."
