= Monopoly (1999 video game) =

1999 video game

- Developer: Mind's Eye Productions
- Publisher: Hasbro Interactive
- Series: Monopoly
- Platform: Nintendo 64
- Release: NA: December 18, 1999
- Genres: Strategy, board game
- Modes: Single-player, multiplayer

Monopoly is a Nintendo 64 video game based on the board game Monopoly, released on December 18, 1999. Developed by Mind's Eye Productions and published by Hasbro Interactive, this title was one of many inspired by the property.

== Gameplay ==
The game contains very similar gameplay to the board game it is based on, with various physical tasks being replaced by automation and digital representations.

== Critical reception ==
Reception

Review scores
Publication	Score
IGN	7.4/10
Nintendo Power	6.3/10

IGN reviewer Aaron Boulding thought the ability to customize the game according to house rules was an "endearing" feature, and appreciated that it kept the spirit of the board game it was based on. Nintendo Power praised certain aspects of the game, but thought there was not enough visual contrast between the different squares on the board. Nintendojo thought the adaptation was "too true" to its source material and was disappointed it did not contain gameplay such as mini games and skill events. HonestGamers felt that the interface was "overly complicated" and "clumsy". French review site X64 gave the game a rating of 50/100.
