= Thomas & Friends Railway Adventures =

2001 video game

- Front of the packaging box, with a plastic window showing the playset
- Developer: Minds Eye Productions
- Publisher: Infogrames
- Series: Thomas & Friends
- Platform: Windows
- Release: August 14, 2001
- Genre: Educational
- Mode: Single-player

Thomas & Friends Railway Adventures, also known as Thomas & Friends: Railway Adventures CD-ROM Playset, is a 2001 educational video game developed by British studio Minds Eye Productions and published by Infogrames. Controlling Thomas the Tank Engine by mounting the included playset onto their computer keyboard, the player explores the fictional Island of Sodor whilst performing jobs. It was released for Windows computers on August 14, 2001.

== Gameplay ==
Thomas & Friends Railway Adventures includes a physical playset that the player mounts onto the computer keyboard using an elastic Velcro strap. The player uses the playset to control Thomas the Tank Engine; the throttle controls his speed, the lever toggles railway switches, and the train whistle can be sounded.

As Thomas, the player travels around the Island of Sodor, visiting stations and destinations while completing four simple jobs such as finding lost mailbags or gathering needed supplies. Thomas meets several Thomas & Friends characters during these tasks, and all four levels are available from the start. Video clips from the television series can be viewed during play, and finishing levels unlocks minigames with track mazes, including a race with Bertie the Bus and an encounter with Diesel 10.

== Reception ==
Reception

Review scores
Publication	Score
All Game Guide	3/5
The Desert Sun	4.5/5

Ginger Critchton, writing for The Birmingham News, praised the graphics but disliked the dialogue. All Game Guide recommended Thomas & Friends Railway Adventures to children who enjoy Thomas & Friends or trains in general. Chalie Miller from The Post-Standard called Thomas & Friends Railway Adventures a fun education experience for the afternoon.

Thomas & Friends: Railway Adventures ranked as the 17th best selling PC game for the week ending December 1, 2001, according to NPD Techworld.
