= Thomas & Friends: The Great Festival Adventure =

1999 video game

- Developer: Minds Eye Productions
- Publisher: Hasbro Interactive
- Series: Thomas & Friends
- Platform: Windows
- Release: 1999
- Genre: Action-adventure
- Mode: Single-player

Thomas & Friends: The Great Festival Adventure is an action-adventure game developed by Minds Eye Productions and published by Hasbro Interactive in 1999 for Windows computers. It is based on the Thomas & Friends television series and follows the characters as they help prepare for the Big Festival.

== Gameplay ==
Thomas & Friends: The Great Festival Adventure begins with a short video and a map of the Island of Sodor, after which the player either travels with Thomas the Tank Engine or selects individual activities from the island map. Thomas, Percy, and Gordon are preparing for the Big Festival, and the player assists Sir Topham Hatt with preparations. The gameplay consists of seven single-player activities, each with three difficulty levels, where the player helps Thomas unload packages, pick up passengers, and build fairground rides while practicing skills such as mouse movement, clicking, colours, shapes, and counting. After completing an activity, the player sees a short video featuring Thomas or another engine, and may switch activities at any time. Sir Topham Hatt provides guidance from the options screen, and finishing activities allows the player to print Certificates of Achievement and postcards of the engines.

== Release ==
The Great Festival Adventure was re-released in the United Kingdom by Mindscape in July 2005 alongside the other Thomas PC games under a sub-licensing deal with Atari and HIT Entertainment to coincide with the franchise's sixth anniversary.

== Reception ==
Reception

Review scores
Publication	Score
The Guardian	8/10
All Game Guide	3.5/5
FamilyPC	92%

Sharon Mehl, writing for Kids Domain, recommended Thomas & Friends The Great Festival Adventure to children who like Thomas the Tank Engine or trains in general. Clayton Crooks from All Game Guide liked the features but disliked the lack of difficulty options for older children.
