= Monopoly (1991 video game) =

- North American Game Boy box art
- Developer: Sculptured Software
- Publishers: Parker Brothers; Majesco
- Programmers: Bill Williams (NES); Ryan Ridges, John Lund (Game Boy); Jeff Hughes, Yousuke Shimizu (Japanese versions)
- Composers: Paul Webb (Game Boy/NES); Nu Romantic Productions (Genesis/SNES)
- Series: Monopoly
- Platforms: NES, Super NES, Game Boy, Sega Genesis, Game Boy Color
- Release: May 1991: NES; NA: May 1991; JP: November 1, 1991; EU: 1991 Game Boy; JP: December 20, 1991; NA: December 1991; EU: 1992 Super NES; NA: September 1992 Genesis; NA: 1992 Game Boy Color; JP: December 11, 1998; NA: May 1, 1999
- Genres: Strategy, board game

Monopoly is a 1991 video game based on the board game of the same name, released on Game Boy, Sega Genesis, NES, and Super NES. Developed by Sculptured Software and published by Parker Brothers (the Game Boy version was published by Majesco), this title was one of many inspired by the property.

It is not to be confused with the 1993 Monopoly game, which was released in Japan only.

== Gameplay ==
The game contains very similar gameplay to the board game it is based on, with various physical tasks being replaced by automation and digital representations. Players choose among the eight classic characters: hat, wheelbarrow, iron, horse, car, boot, thimble, and dog. The goal is to buy as much property as possible when a player is working around the board. With properties, one can build houses and hotels on them and charge opponents rent. The winner sends others into bankruptcy.

== Critical reception ==
Reception

Aggregate score
Aggregator	Score
GameRankings	50% (SNES)

Review scores
Publication	Score
Electronic Gaming Monthly	6.25/10 (NES) (Note: In Electronic Gaming Monthly's review of the NES versions, two critics gave it an 8/10, one a 4/10, and another a 5/10.)
Nintendo Power	3.725/5 (Game Boy) (Note: Nintendo Power gave the Game Boy port a 3.4/5 for graphics/sound, 3.7/5 for play control, 3.8/5 for challenge, and 4/5 for theme/fun.)

Earl Green of AllGame deemed it "one of the better translations" of the Monopoly board game, due to it "captur[ing] the visual essence" of its source material. Just Games Retro argued that the game solved various problems of the board game, including it being too long, too fiddly, requiring a certain number of human players, and requiring the entire game to be finished in one sitting, noting that the gameplay is streamlined due to the digitisation of many aspects like banking. Pocket Magazine deemed it faithful to the original, while praising its gameplay, graphics, and sound, though noted the shortness of rounds. Sega-16 noted that it has the fun of Monopoly without the tedium of setting up and packing away the pieces. IGN wrote it was a good game for solitaire play, but not for multi-human play.

Entertainment Weekly gave the game a C− and wrote that the computerized opponents took 10–15 seconds each to make their moves, and this made the game rather slow.
