= Monopoly (1995 video game) =

1995 video game

- Developer: Westwood Studios
- Publisher: Hasbro Electronic Entertainment
- Composer: Frank Klepacki
- Series: Monopoly
- Platforms: Macintosh, Windows
- Release: NA: September 1995
- Genres: Strategy, board game

Monopoly (also known as Monopoly CD-ROM to distinguish it from other similarly titled games) is a 1995 video game based on the board game Monopoly. It was developed by Westwood Studios, published by Hasbro Electronic Entertainment and distributed by Virgin Interactive Entertainment. This title was one of many inspired by the Monopoly property. It was later reissued in 1998 with different box art. The game included an original soundtrack composed by Frank Klepacki.

== Gameplay ==
The game is an adaption of the board game of the same name, with the components of physical gameplay given automation and digital representations. 3D animations are provided for player movement across the board. Up to six human players can play either on the same computer or over LAN. The game's music was in a MIDI format and had a ragtime theme, while the sound effects were in WAV. Like the board game, players roll the dice, travel around the board to collect properties, and aim to bankrupt their opponents.

== Development ==
The game was developed by Las Vegas software development company Westwood Studios, on behalf of publisher Hasbro Electronic Entertainment (later Hasbro Interactive). The division was created by Hasbro in 1995 to create video game adaptions of their most popular titles. In a May 1995 edition of Bangor Daily News, it was reported that Hasbro Interactive was currently testing the game, which the company claimed would be the first to have a multiplayer feature allowing players to play each other over the Internet. While Hasbro stockholders expected to see the game during the company's annual New York City meeting on May 12, 1995, the game was officially previewed at the 1995 Electronic Entertainment Expo in Los Angeles. Monopoly was released in September 1995 to coincide with the board game's 60th anniversary, allowing over 23 million players to play in a variety of languages; the game offered immediate translations of currency exchange and properties, allowing international players to view regional versions of the game when playing.

== Reception ==
=== Sales ===
According to market research firm PC Data, Monopoly was the 11th-best-selling computer game in the United States for the year 1996. The game placed fifth on PC Data's annual chart the next year, with 397,864 units sold and almost $13 million earned in revenue. In 1998, Monopoly sold another 273,937 copies and earned an additional $6.36 million in the United States alone; this secured it position 16 on PC Data's sales rankings that year. The game claimed sixth place for the first six months of 1999, but dropped to 20th for the full year, with sales of 265,408 units.

Monopoly's sales in the United States alone reached 1.27 million copies by September 1999. As a result, PC Data declared it the country's fifth-best-selling computer game from that date to January 1993.

=== Critical reviews ===
Reception

Review scores
| Publication | Score |
|---|---|
| Macworld | 3.5/5 |
| Computer Game Review | 89/89/90 |

Trent Ward of GameSpot wrote that while the notion of making a video game adaption of Monopoly was a "simple concept", the version that the developers came up with was "brilliant" because they "set their minds to it". The Jerusalem Post wrote that the "wonderful" adaption "loses nothing" from its source material, and added that its only disadvantage was that observant Jews couldn't play the game during Shabbat. The Washington Times thought the developer brought the board game "to a new level", and noted that the digital version takes away the intrusive issue of "Who's going to be the banker?".

Macworld's Michael Gowan praised Monopoly's animation and online play, and found its straightforward design "a more-than-welcome breather from a sea of uninspiring games trying to do too much." He summarized it as "just as enjoyable as the original [board game]."

According to Media Matrix Inc., Monopoly was the 20th top game played by U.S. Home PC users across March 2000, with 454 unique persons, 0.52% share across PC users, and 0.94% share across PC game users.

Monopoly was a runner-up for Computer Gaming World's award for the best "Classics/Puzzles" game of 1995, which ultimately went to You Don't Know Jack. The editors praised it as "the best conversion [of Monopoly] to the computer yet." In 1996, the magazine named Monopoly the 113th best game ever. The editors wrote, "Based on the quintessential family boardgame, this Internet-capable version of Monopoly offered more than we ever expected in a computer version."
