= Nuon (DVD technology) =

Video game console

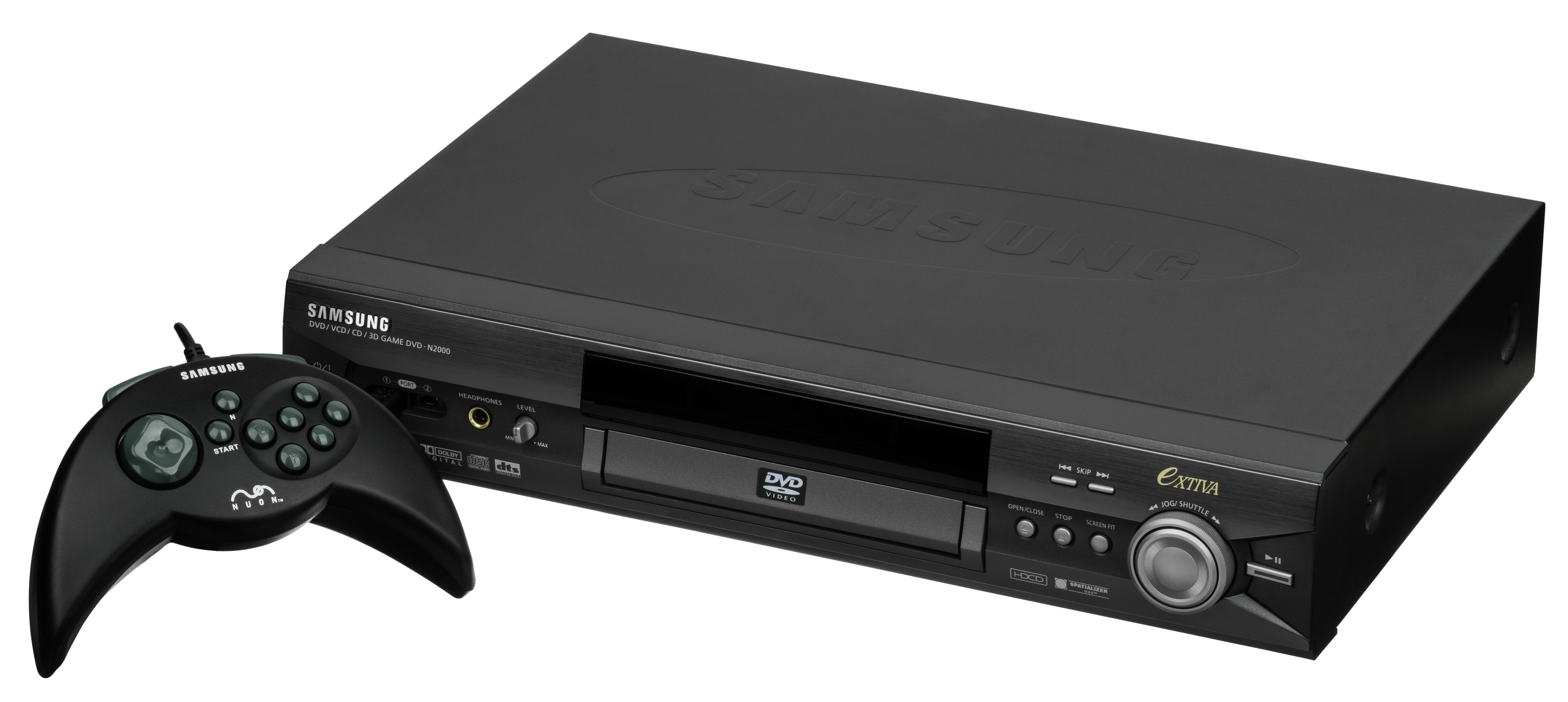
- The DVD-N2000 Nuon player made by Samsung with pack-in controller
- Developer: VM Labs
- Manufacturer: Motorola, RCA, Samsung, Toshiba
- Type: Home video game console
- Generation: Sixth
- Released: July 2000
- Discontinued: 2003–2004
- Website: www.nuon-tech.com (archived)

Nuon is a technology developed by VM Labs that adds features to a DVD player. In addition to viewing DVDs, one can play 3D video games and use enhanced DVD navigational tools such as zoom and smooth scanning of DVD playback. One could also play CDs while the Nuon graphics processor generates synchronized graphics on the screen. There were plans to provide Internet access capability in the next generation of Nuon-equipped DVD players.

== History ==
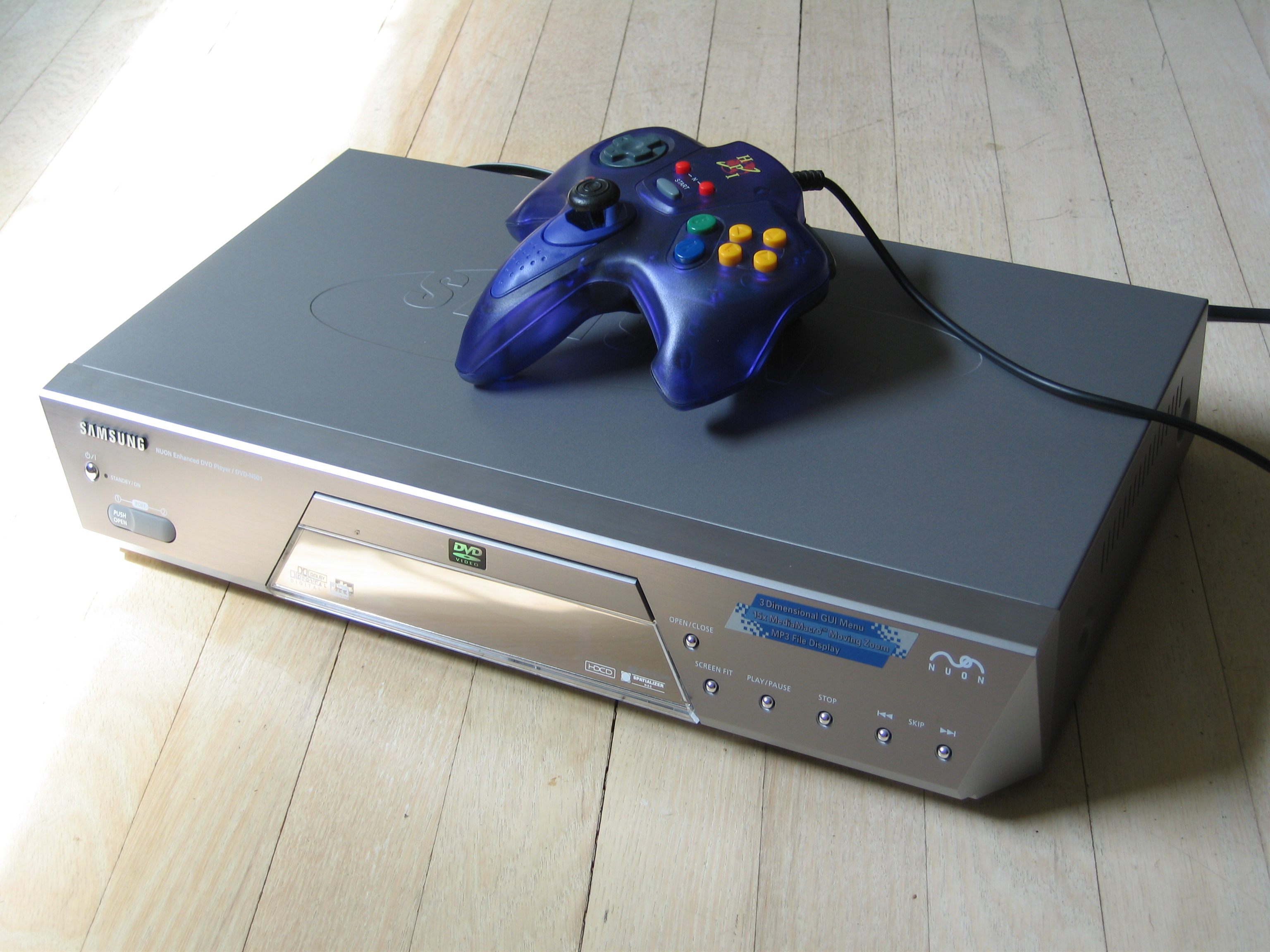
A Nuon DVD player made by Samsung

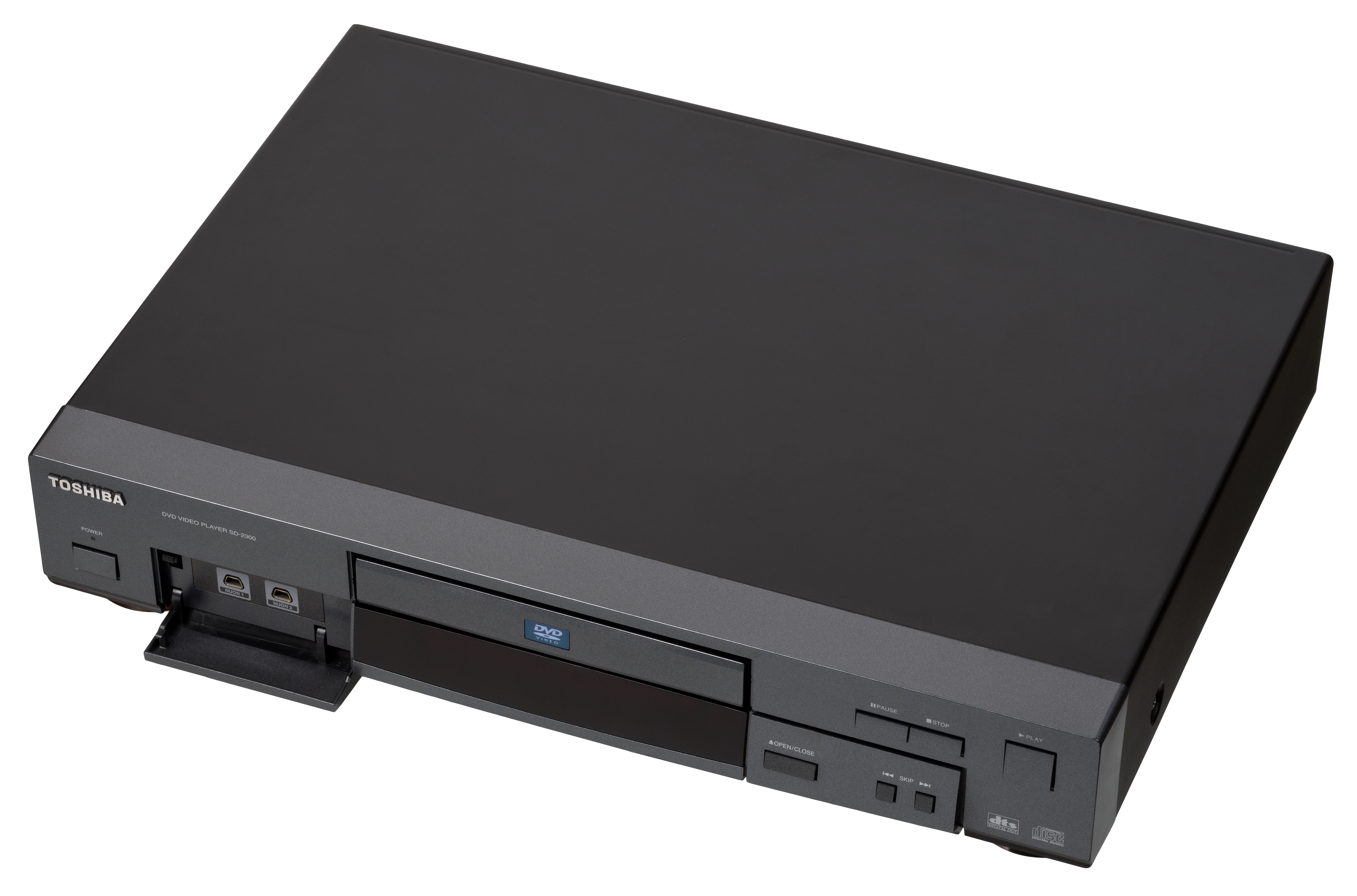
A Nuon manufactured by Toshiba

Nuon was first unveiled under the codename "Project X", set for a release during the 1998 Christmas shopping season, and was featured in Electronic Gaming Monthly's 1999 Video Game Buyer's Guide. One of the Nuon's main software developers was Jeff Minter, who created a version of Tempest titled Tempest 3000 for the system and the built-in VLM-2 audio visualizer. Manufacturing of the hardware was handled by several original equipment manufacturers.

The system's software development kit (SDK) was priced at roughly one-third of that of the PlayStation SDK, and following a strong showing at the 1998 Consumer Electronics Show, VM Labs shipped out several dozen SDKs to developers.

When it was first announced, the Nuon's creators envisioned it as a competitor for the upcoming video game consoles from the leading manufacturers. However, the Nuon platform was primarily marketed as an expanded DVD format. A large majority of Nuon players that were sold in fact resembled typical consumer DVD players with the only noticeable difference being a Nuon logo. Nuon players offered a number of features that were not available on other DVD players when playing standard DVD-formatted titles. These included very smooth forward and reverse functionality and the ability to smoothly zoom in and out of sections of the video image. In addition, Nuon provided a software platform to DVD authors to provide interactive software-like features to their titles.

In North America, Nuon was used in the Samsung DVD-N501 and DVD-N2000 models; they also released several models in other parts of the world: DVD-N504 (Europe), DVD N505 (Europe), and DVD-N591 (Korea). Toshiba released the SD-2300 DVD player, and there are two RCA models, the DRC300N and DRC480N. The Nuon was also used in Motorola's Streamaster 5000 "Digital DNA" set-top box.

Nuon was created by VM Labs, whose assets were sold to Genesis Microchip in April 2002. By November 2004, there were no Nuon-enabled DVD players shipping and no new Nuon software titles released or in development.

=== Specification ===
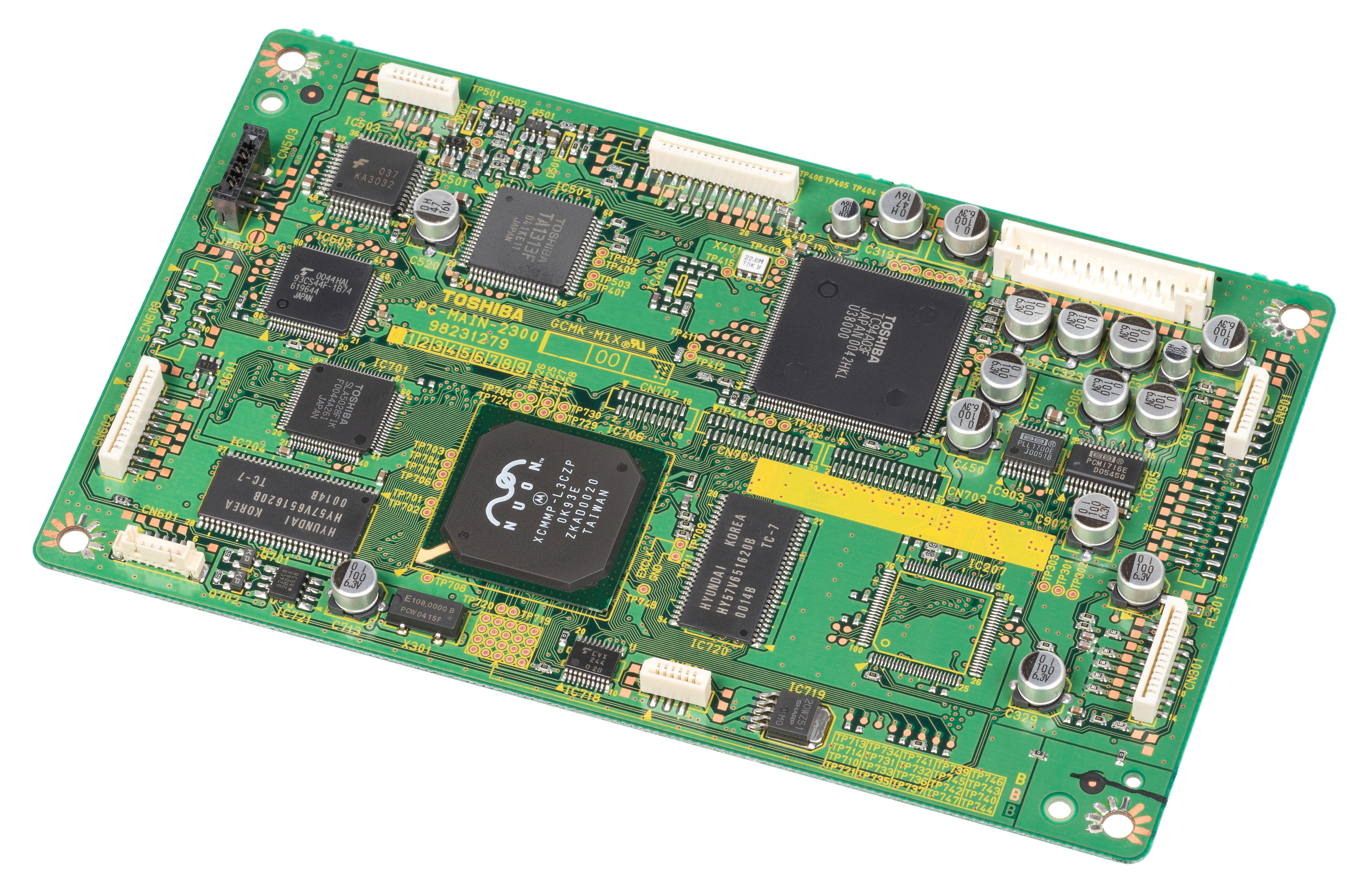
The motherboard of a Toshiba SD-2300 player, showing the Nuon XCMMP-L3BZPDVD processor

- Four 128-bit 54 MHz or 108 MHz Nuon MPE (Media Processing Element) very long instruction word processors supporting parallel operations on (at most) 32-bit scalars. An MPE's register file contains eight 128-bit registers, which can be used to store vectors of that size (composed of 4 scalars), or be partitioned down to offer thirty-two 32-bit (scalar) registers, or eight packets of 3 (pixel) or 4 ("small") 16-bit vectors. Each MPE operates on RAM that is local to itself, but MPEs 1 and 4 can directly operate on data located in system memory. Those same specific MPEs can use their memories as configurable caches, and have access to additional tag RAM for that purpose. MPEs have a hardware multiply unit, but no hardware division. There is no hardware support for floating point computation. Some report(s) suggested that a certain model had sported a 333+ MHz clock frequency but it was never released widely.
- MCS-251 microcontroller for background task
- 32 MB 8-bit Fast Page DRAM at 33 MHz, 512 KB sound RAM and 24 KB programmable ROM
- 2x 3d Media GL MPE with 8 MB 32-bit video RAM at 66 MHz.
- 64~256 MB writable ROM and optional hard drive (up to 137 GB)
- Optical drive support DVD or CD-R

=== Peripherals and accessories ===
Peripherals for Nuon-enhanced DVD players included the following:

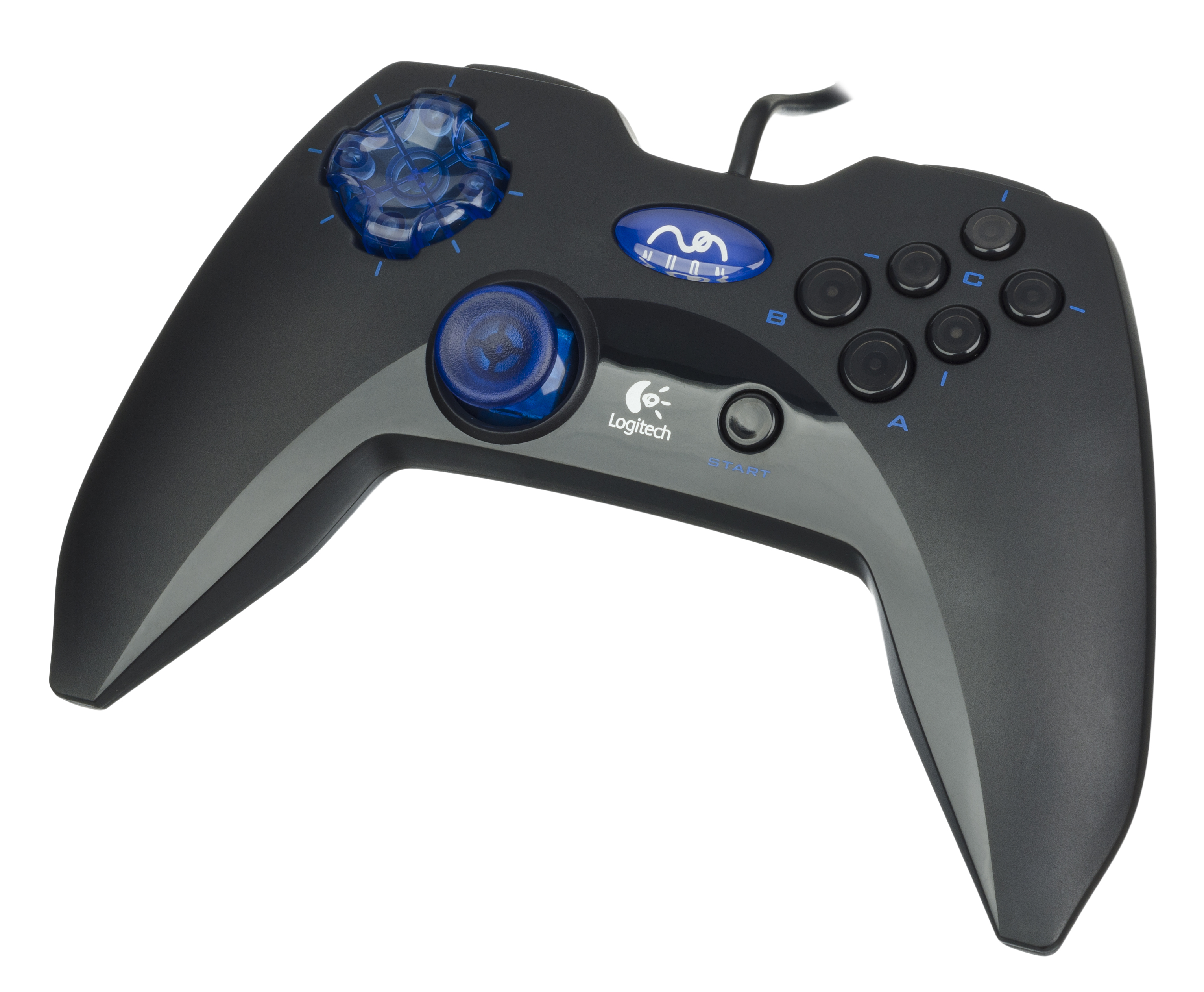
The Logitech gamepad

- Logitech Gamepad
- Pro-elite controller
- AirPlay wireless controller
- Stealth controller
- Warrior Digital-D pad
- controller extension cable
- port replicator to move the Nuon ports to anywhere desired

=== Released movies ===
Only four DVD releases utilized Nuon technology. All of them were released by 20th Century Fox Home Entertainment:

- The Adventures of Buckaroo Banzai Across the 8th Dimension
- Bedazzled (2000 remake)
- Dr. Dolittle 2
- Planet of the Apes (2001 film, Bug Free Version UPC - 024543028987)

=== Games ===
Only eight games were officially released for the Nuon:

- Tempest 3000
- Freefall 3050 A.D.
- Merlin Racing (Later had a sequel entitled Miracle Space Race for the PlayStation), and an altered version called Rascal Racers; released for PlayStation in 2002.
- Space Invaders X.L.
- Iron Soldier 3 (later recalled due to incompatibility with some players)
- Ballistic (only available with Samsung players)
- The Next Tetris DLX (only available with Toshiba players)
- Crayon Shin-chan 3 (Korean-only release)

==== Unreleased ====
- aMaze
- Atari's Greatest Hits
- Battleship: Surface Thunder
- Boggle
- Breakout
- Bugdom
- Bust-A-Move 4
- Dragon's Lair
- Dragon's Lair II: Time Warp
- The Game of Life
- Hoyle Card Games
- Jeopardy!
- Knockout Kings
- Madden NFL
- Monopoly
- Myst
- Native II
- Need for Speed III: Hot Pursuit
- New Scrabble
- Nuon Board Games
- Nuon Casino
- Nuon R.C. Racing
- Pitfall: The Mayan Adventure
- Pong: The Next Level
- Power Shovel
- RC de Go!
- Risk II
- Riven
- Shanghai: Mahjong Essentials
- Sherlock Holmes: Consulting Detective
- Sorry!
- Space Ace
- Speedball 2100
- Spider-Man
- Star Trek: Invasion
- Tiger Woods PGA Golf
- Titan 3
- Wheel of Fortune
- Yahtzee
- zCards

=== Collections and samplers ===
- Interactive Sampler (three different versions)
- Nuon Games + Demos (collection from Nuon-Dome)
- Nuon-Dome PhillyClassic 5 Demo Disc (giveaway collection)

== Homebrew development ==
In late 2001, VM Labs released an SDK which allowed developers to program apps/games for their Nuon system. Only the Samsung DVD-N501/DVDN504/DVDN505 and RCA DRC300N/DRC480N can load homebrew games.

Some homebrew titles have been created for or ported to Nuon. They are not commercially available and require the user to burn the material to a Nuon-compatible CD-R.

== Notes ==
- Moss, Richard (June 28, 2015). "Remembering Nuon, the gaming chip that nearly changed the world—but didn't". Ars Technica. Condé Nast.
- Moss, Richard (June 2, 2014). "Life after death: meet the people ensuring that yesterday's systems will never be forgotten". Edge Online. Future plc. Archived from the original on June 5, 2014.
