= Freefall 3050 A.D. =

2000 action game for Nuon DVD players

- Developer(s): Total ArKade Software
- Publisher(s): VM Labs; TAKS (Windows)
- Producer(s): Bill Rehbock; Joe Sousa
- Designer(s): Tony Takoushi
- Programmer(s): Jay Abbot; Per Svensson
- Artist(s): Johnny Wood; Toby Brace
- Platform(s): Microsoft Windows, Nuon
- Release: Nuon: NA: December 12, 2000; Windows: WW: January 24, 2019
- Genre(s): Action
- Mode(s): Single-player

Freefall 3050 A.D. is an action video game developed by Total ArKade Software and published in 2000 by VM Labs for the Nuon. It was one of only eight games officially released for the Nuon. The title was ported to Microsoft Windows in January 2019, and a cancelled port for the Xbox was unofficially released as open source in August 2019.

== Gameplay ==
Nuon version screenshot.

Freefall 3050 A.D. is an action game where the player controls Commander Alexander Menon, a cop in the year 3050. In this futuristic setting, humanity has been forced into extremely tall buildings which stretch into an environmentally controlled stratosphere. The increased population density also brought an increase in criminal activity, leading to the formation of the "Drop Corps", an elite group of law enforcers equipped with laser weapons and advanced skydiving technology. The game features 15 levels, and 4 training levels. Each mission starts with the main character launching into a freefall to pursue and shoot down criminals. The player can use weaponry such as laser guns, homing missiles and grenades, as well as specialized tools such as airbrakes or anti-gravity boots to slow the character's descent. The player must also manage an oxygen supply, as well as the character's health and shield, all of which can be replenished by collecting pick-ups throughout the levels.

== Development and release ==
Tony Takoushi, a veteran of the video game industry who had previously worked as a game developer for Sega, was looking for a new project when his friend Jeff Minter (who was developing Tempest 3000 to the Nuon) suggested that Takoushi pitch a game idea to VM Labs, who proceeded to approve the project that became Freefall 3050 A.D. Difficulties arose over the course of the production of the game, because VM Labs hadn't finished the software on which the game would run. Tony Takoushi founded Total ArKade Software (TAKS) to develop this game specifically. Takoushi later spent time working for Halfbrick Studios before relaunching Total ArKade Software in 2012 to produce mobile games.

Freefall 3050 A.D. was first released for the Nuon by VM Labs on December 12, 2000, becoming one of only eight games officially released for the platform. The game was later ported to Microsoft Windows in January 2019. An in-development Xbox port was cancelled in 2004 due to the impending release of the Xbox 360. TAKS announced that the cancelled port would be completed and released in April 2007 for direct purchase through TAKS exclusively, however TAKS ended up handing over the game's source code to Australian-American homebrew developer Dimitris Giannakis, who finished programming a working Xbox version and released the code as open source on Archive.org in August 2019. Playing the Xbox port requires a modded Xbox to run because the game is considered unofficial homebrew software.

== Reception ==
Reception

Review score
Publication	Score
GameFan	80/100

GameFan's Eric C. Mylonas rated the game 80 out of 100, saying the game's "originality and ideas may just set a new precedent in game design" but that the controls will take some getting used to because the game was developed for an analog controller with numerous buttons similar to the Nintendo 64, however the Nuon console ended up launching with standard D-pads. Syzygy's Jason W. Cody gave a positive review of the game, stating that "Tony Takoushi is a gamer who will single handledly instill in you a new hope for the future of gaming". An in-depth review of the game by NUON-Dome's Kevin Manne was critical of the unpolished graphics and high difficulty, but praised the full motion video cutscenes, the techno rave soundtrack and the very original concept. In a review for Screwjumper!, while calling it the spiritual successor to Freefall 3050 A.D., GamesRadar+'s Greg Sewart was very critical of the game, mentioning it "sucked" and how "no one bothered playing for more than a few minutes". Ars Technica's Richard Moss called the title "strange and disorienting" although it confirms that those who have played it praise its originality. The original Nuon version sold less than 10,000 units.
