= Tempest 3000 =

2000 video game

- Developer: Llamasoft
- Publisher: Hasbro Interactive
- Producer: Joe Sousa
- Programmer: Jeff Minter
- Composers: André Meyer; Ian Goddard; James Grunke
- Series: Tempest
- Platform: Nuon
- Release: NA: December 13, 2000; EU: March 2001
- Genre: Tube shooter
- Modes: Single-player, multiplayer

Tempest 3000 is a tube shooter video game developed by Llamasoft for the Nuon. It was published by Hasbro Interactive in North America on December 13, 2000, and Europe in March 2001. It is a follow-up to Tempest 2000, an updated remake of Dave Theurer's arcade game Tempest (1981). The player controls a claw-shaped blaster, shooting at enemies and obstacles, scoring points, and surviving multiple levels. The game modifies and builds upon the gameplay from Tempest 2000, introducing new enemies and mechanics.

Tempest 3000 was one of the first games unveiled for Nuon and was programmed by Jeff Minter, who previously worked on Tempest 2000. In the late 1990s, Minter left Atari Corporation after completing Defender 2000 to work for VM Labs. After Minter designed an audio visualizer for the Nuon, VM Labs asked him to refocus his efforts on Tempest, which was challenging due to the limited power of the console's hardware.

Tempest 3000 received generally favorable reception from critics; the soundtrack, frenetic action, game mechanics, and difficulty were praised, but the blurry visual effects as well as the lack of versus and cooperative multiplayer modes were criticized. By 2003, it had sold over 20,000 copies. It was followed by Tempest 4000 (2018). In 2024, a limited re-release of the game was made by publisher Songbird Productions.

== Gameplay ==
The player's blaster firing at enemies and obstacles appearing from the center in "Bonid of Doom", one of the levels in Tempest 3000

Following the gameplay of Tempest (1981) and Tempest 2000, Tempest 3000 is a tube shooter game where the player shoots enemies and obstacles as they appear from the center of the screen. The player controls a claw-shaped blaster, scoring points by hitting targets as they try to survive multiple levels. The blaster is also equipped with a "Superzapper" that destroys all enemies on-screen, which recharges between each level. Players can collect power-ups and upgrades, which appear when enemies or their bullets are destroyed.

The game modifies and builds upon the enhancements from Tempest 2000 with new mechanics. Instead of a jump ability, the blaster can now spend fuel to hover and glide over the web. A homing missile power-up allows the player to target enemies in two lanes of the web. The player can also improve their score multiplier by collecting power-ups, but using a "Superzapper" resets the multiplier to zero. Power-ups also activate a remote droid that appears above the web to help the player destroy enemies. The game also introduces new enemies to the series, such as Rotors and Unmaker-Spiders that move and reform the web respectively.

When all enemies have been destroyed, the player warps to the next level, but must avoid or destroy spikes left by Spikers and Super Spikers that are in the way. Hitting any spike will destroy the blaster and force the player to start over. The player can also collect three warp tokens to access a bonus round, and completing it allows the player to skip two levels. The game features over 256 levels, with the last half being procedurally generated. The player loses a life when their blaster is destroyed or captured, and the game is over when all lives are lost. The player can resume their progress via passwords provided after completing each odd-numbered level. In addition, the game also has a multiplayer option which allows two players to play by alternating turns.

== Development ==
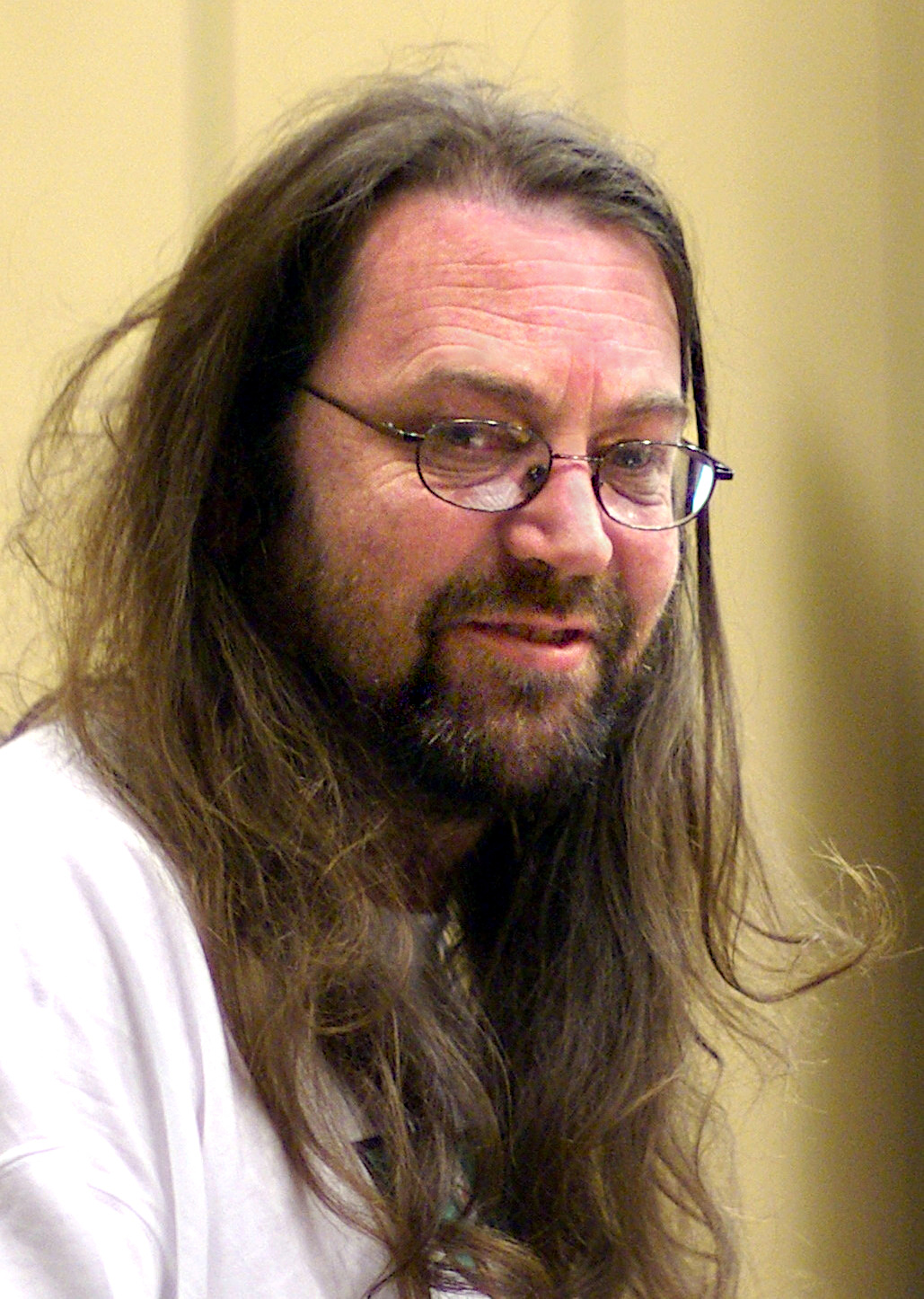
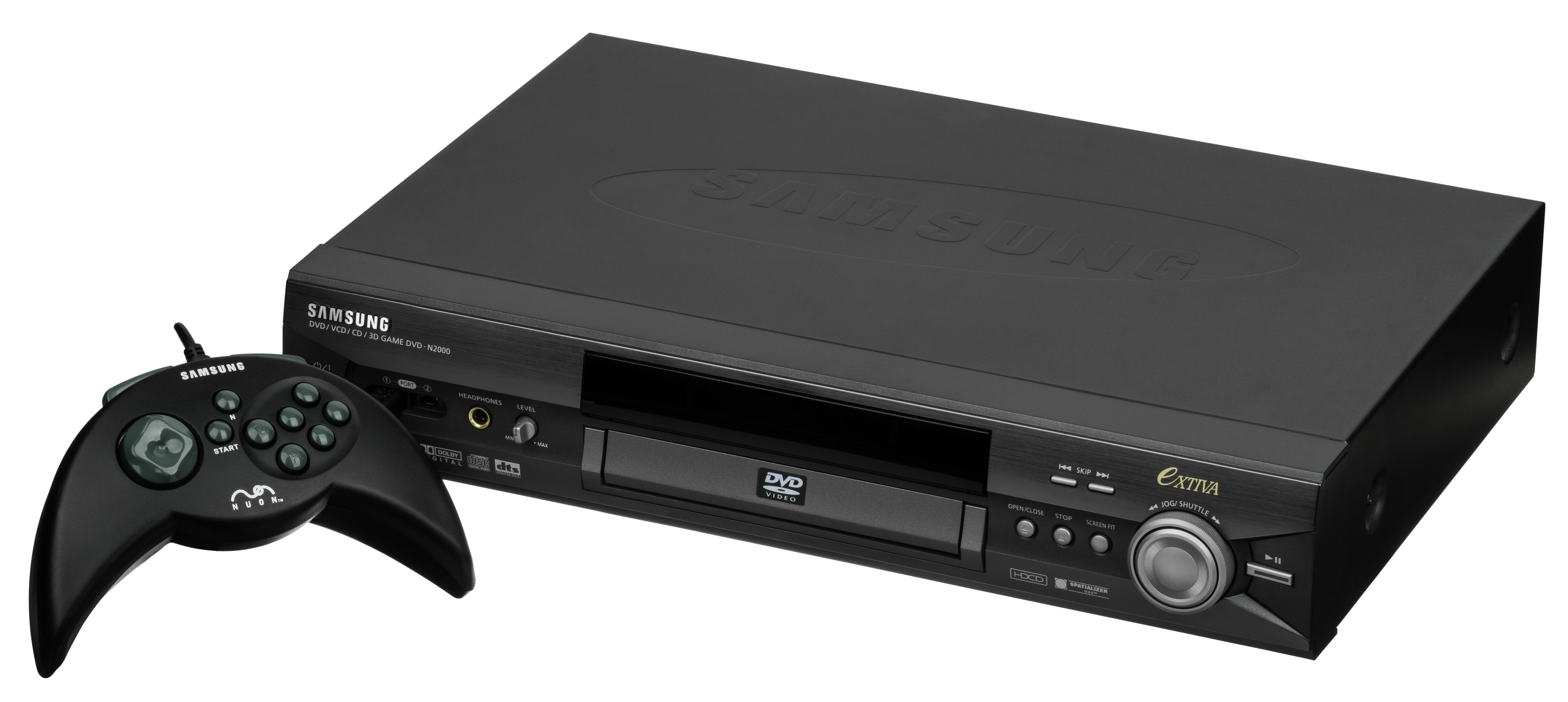
Tempest 3000 programmer Jeff Minter (pictured in 2007) worked for VM Labs with software design and writing the VLM-2 audio visualizer for the Nuon (left).

Tempest 3000 is a follow-up to Tempest 2000, itself an updated remake of Dave Theurer's arcade game Tempest (1981). It was programmed by Jeff Minter, founder of Llamasoft, who previously worked on Tempest 2000. Minter left Atari after completing Defender 2000 in December 1995 and returned to Wales to work for VM Labs, a California-based semiconductor company founded by Richard Miller with former Atari and Sony staff. He helped with software design and wrote the built-in VLM-2 audio visualizer for the Nuon DVD technology, then codenamed "Project X".

In 1997, Minter teased on his personal website that Tempest 3000 could happen, as VM Labs had contacts where they could obtain the rights to Tempest. In 1998, VM Labs asked him to create a Tempest game for the Nuon, allowing him to apply ideas he had tried with a version of Breakout for his particle effects system. The game was produced by Joe Sousa, who worked on Atari Jaguar titles such as Cybermorph and Kasumi Ninja. The soundtrack features nineteen songs, twelve of which are remixed tracks from Tempest 2000, while the remaining music are original compositions by André Meyer, Ian "T(NT)" Goddard, and James Grunke.

Minter said it was difficult taking advantage of the Nuon's hardware due to its underpowered architecture, forcing him to limit the game program to less than four kilobytes of RAM. According to Minter, VLM-2 code was integrated into the game to generate live background effects. Production of the game lasted two years, with development concluding in October 2000. Minter considers Tempest 3000 to be the most difficult programming job he has ever done, but he enjoyed his five years working with VM Labs and expressed pride in his work.

== Release ==
Tempest 3000 was one of the first games unveiled for the Nuon, with public demos appearing as early as 1998. The game was showcased at E3 1998 and CES 2000. More details were announced during its E3 2000 showcase, revealing that Hasbro Interactive would publish the title as part of a multi-game deal with VM Labs. A demo disc bundled with Samsung DVD-N2000 models featured the game as one of four included demos.

Tempest 3000 was released in North America on December 13, 2000, followed by Europe in March 2001. In 2001, Jeff Minter donated a unique copy called Tempest 3000: Flossie Edition as part of a Tempest 2000 competition at JagFest 2K1, which contained drawings as well as a piece of wool and a goatee trim. The game has not been ported to other platforms due to its reliance on assembly language. It was omitted from the Llamasoft: The Jeff Minter Story compilation due to the Nuon being "a bridge too far" to emulate, according to Digital Eclipse editorial director Chris Kohler. In 2024, publisher Songbird Productions, in association with Atari, made a limited re-release of the game on May 7.

== Reception ==
Reception

Review scores
Publication	Score
Edge	9/10
Electronic Gaming Monthly	6.5/10
Digital Press	7/10
neXGam	8.7/10

Tempest 3000 received generally favorable reviews from critics. According to GameState magazine, the game had sold over 20,000 copies by 2003. Chris Johnston of Electronic Gaming Monthly (EGM) highlighted its evolution of the series' gameplay, sense of humor, and difficulty. Edge lauded its attractive graphics, frenetic action, balanced playability, and difficulty curve. Syzygy's Jason W. Cody liked its addition of the bonus multiplier mechanic, new enemies and music.

Digital Press' Russ Perry Jr. praised the audiovisual presentation but felt it was difficult to control without a rotary controller or alternative control schemes. MyAtari magazine deemed it a must-have title for Nuon, commending the "jaw-dropping" visuals, techno soundtrack, and frenetic action. German website neXGam celebrated its impressive graphical department, soundscapes, and numerous levels, but criticized the lack of two-player versus and cooperative modes. The game's blurry visual effects were also criticized by several reviewers, including EGM, Syzygy, and Tips & Tricks.

The game was a runner-up for the "Graphical Achievement" and "Audio Achievement" categories during the Edge Awards in 2001, but lost to Jet Set Radio and Alien Resurrection (2000) respectively. Ars Technica considered Tempest 3000 to be the most significant title for Nuon, while Time Extension regarded it as the "crown jewel" of the Nuon's game library, citing its "raw arcade thrills", pounding dance music, and unique visual look.
