= Iron Soldier =

1994 video game

- Cover art by Steve Lang
- Developer: Eclipse Software Design
- Publisher: Atari Corporation
- Producer: Sean Patten
- Designer: Marc Rosocha
- Programmer: Michael Bittner
- Artists: Bleick Bleicken; Christian Reismüller; Oliver Lindau
- Composers: Joachim Gierveld; Mario Knezović; Nathan Brenholdt
- Series: Iron Soldier
- Platform: Atari Jaguar
- Release: NA: December 22, 1994; EU: January 1995
- Genre: Mech simulation
- Mode: Single-player

Iron Soldier is a 1994 mech simulation video game developed by Eclipse Software Design and published by Atari for the Atari Jaguar. It is the first entry in the Iron Soldier series. Set in the future on an industrialized Earth, the player takes on the role of a resistance member piloting a robot to overthrow the military dictatorship of the Iron Fist Corporation. The player is tasked with various objectives while fighting enemies in multiple missions.

Atari contacted Eclipse Software about making games for the Jaguar; lead designer Marc Rosocha asked for a suggestion and met with producer Sean Patten, who told him to make a mech game based on a script he wrote due to his fascination with mechs and Godzilla, serving as basis for Iron Soldier. Rosocha agreed as long as they could "blow everything up", to which Patten agreed and the project entered production in 1993. Patten's fanaticism for modern ground combat inspired many of the weapons and enemies in the game, as the tactics and style of urban combat appealed to him.

Iron Soldier received generally favorable reception from critics, with praise for the polygonal visuals, audio department, destructible environment, and gameplay, but most had mixed opinions regarding the controls. Some reviewers also criticized the lack of texture mapping and additional mission variety, as well as the slow movement. By 1995, the game had sold 21,240 copies. It was followed by Iron Soldier 2 (1997). Retrospective commentary in the years following its release have hailed it as one of the best titles for the Jaguar.

== Gameplay ==
Iron Soldier is a mech simulation game played from a first-person perspective. The premise is set in the future on an industrialized Earth, where the Iron Fist Corporation (IFC) used military force to conquer governments and establish a global military dictatorship. To keep urban population in check, IFC developed a new weapon known as the Iron Soldier (IS), a 42-foot-tall piloted robot. A resistance group was formed to stop IFC and managed to capture a prototype IS unit. The player takes on the role of a resistance member piloting the IS to overthrow IFC.

The player's Iron Soldier (IS) fights an enemy IS and takes down a building

The player has to fulfill mission objectives ranging from destroying specific targets, engaging enemy Iron Soldiers, defending resistance bases, or escorting convoys. There are 16 missions in total, each divided into groups of four. The player then loads the IS with weapons by placing them on the robot's shoulders, hips, and hands. Mounting the same weapon multiple times allows a greater amount of ammo to be carried, but some weapons are restricted to specific mounts. Initially, only the robot's fist manipulator and a semi-automatic assault rifle are available, but the player can expand the arsenal by successfully completing several missions. These include hand grenades, a chainsaw, a gatling gun, a rocket launcher, a railgun, a defense shield, and cruise missiles.

The player controls the IS in a three-dimensional landscape with destructible environments while fighting a variety of enemies. The player can walk forward or backward, look, turn, and fire weapons. Mounted weapons are selected via a controller overlay. The cockpit of the IS displays several features such as a diagram of the robot indicating how much ammo is left in the currently selected weapon, a radar, and an energy bar. A mount cannot be selected if a weapon is out of ammo or no weapon is mounted, however, the player can hit buildings or enemies with the manipulator and stomp gun emplacements, houses, light tanks and trees. Destroying warehouses and factories yields crates containing items such as ammo refills and repair kits. The player can also activate an advanced control method that decouples the robot's direction of movement from its head orientation and allows looking without changing course.

If the IS is destroyed, the current mission will be incomplete, although the player will have three continues per playthrough. If a mission is failed, the player will return to the mission selection and try again without using the continue option. Progress is manually saved after successfully completing the fourth mission in a group. There are three difficulty levels: Easy, Normal and Hard. A fourth difficulty level, Insane, can be selected by entering a cheat code at the options menu.

== Development ==
Heavy property damage, a mech theme and a game that was open world and not on rails.

— Eclipse Software Design founder Marc Rosocha gave Iron Soldier its raison d'être.

Iron Soldier was developed by Eclipse Software Design, a Halle-based game developer founded by former Thalion Software staffer Marc Rosocha. In 1992, Atari contacted Eclipse Software about making games for the in-development Atari Jaguar game console. Rosocha and his team were given an early Jaguar prototype and quickly became familiar with it due to their previous experience with the Atari Falcon. Rosocha proposed a 3D shooter in the style of Starblade as he was a fan of fast-paced arcade games, however the game was rejected because it was on rails, which upset him and almost caused him to cut ties with Atari. Eclipse spent a year creating its own tools for the Jaguar and discussing concepts with Atari, but had nothing finalized regarding a game.

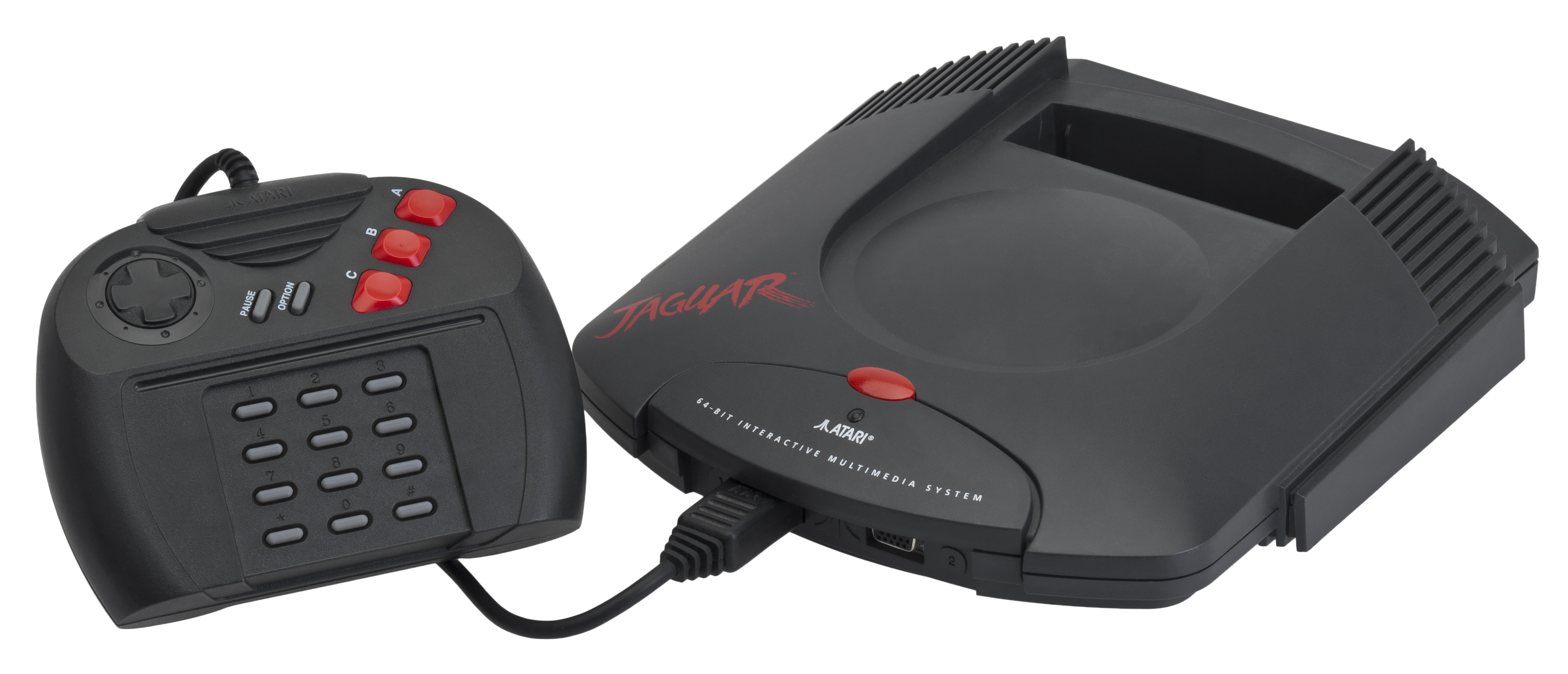
A script by Sean Patten served as basis for Eclipse Software Design to develop Iron Soldier for the Atari Jaguar

Rosocha asked for a suggestion to get started and met with Atari producer Sean Patten, who told him to make a mech game based on a script he wrote due to his fascination with mechs and Godzilla. It became the basis for Iron Soldier, as Rosocha agreed as long as they could "blow everything up", to which Patten readily agreed and the project entered development in November 1993. The game was produced by Patten, with Rosocha as lead designer. Michael Bittner, also formerly of Thalion Software, was responsible for the game's programming, with Rosocha providing additional coding. Artwork for the game was done by Bleick Bleicken, Christian Reismüller and Oliver Lindau. The in-game soundtrack was scored by Joachim Gierveld and Mario Knezović, while the title music was composed by Nathan "Nate" Brenholdt of Atari. The cover art was illustrated by Steve Lang.

Patten explained that his fandom for modern ground combat inspired many of the weapons and enemies in Iron Soldier, as the tactics and style of urban combat appealed to him. The game uses a 3D engine created by Bittner, originally for a 3D space game planned for the Falcon but rewritten for the Jaguar. Buildings and enemy vehicles such as robots consist of 20 and 200 polygons respectively, while object detail is disabled when the player moves beyond a certain distance to keep the frame rate at 30 frames per second. Rosocha found the Jaguar hardware to be complicated but enjoyable because it had no real operating system, allowing direct control with it. Production of the game was completed in ten months.

== Release ==
Iron Soldier was first showcased at the 1994 Summer Consumer Electronics Show. It was planned to feature online multiplayer via Phylon, Inc.'s Jaguar Voice/Data Communicator. The game was released without online support as the modem was delayed and then cancelled in 1995. Atari first published it for the Atari Jaguar in North America on December 22, 1994. To promote the game, Atari produced a television commercial that aired throughout 1995. A European release followed in January 1995. In France and Spain, it was distributed by Accord and Products Final respectively. Mumin Corporation published the game in Japan on March 24, 1995. In 1996, the game's trademark was abandoned. In 2006, AtariAge user "Gusbucket13" released an early prototype under the name Iron Soldier Beta.

== Reception ==
Reception

Review scores
Publication	Score
Computer and Video Games	78/100
Edge	8/10
Electronic Gaming Monthly	8/10, 7/10, 7/10, 7/10, 8/10
Game Informer	8.75/10
Game Players	85%
GameFan	92/100, 91/100, 95/100
GamesMaster	91%
Next Generation	3/5
Atari Explorer Online	5/5
Atari Gaming Headquarters	9/10
Atari World	8/10
Electronic Games	A−
Games World	75/100
Ultimate Future Games	88%
VideoGames	7/10

Awards
Publication	Award
Game Informer (1994)	Best Simulation Game
GameFan (1994)	Best Simulation (Jaguar); Simulation Game of the Year

Iron Soldier received generally favorable reviews from critics. GamePro's Manny LaMancha, while acknowledging that the game's controls are complicated, maintained that they do not take long to master. He also praised the polygonal graphics and its simple but intense gameplay. GameFan's Dave Halverson and Nicholas Dean Des Barres, while criticizing the lack of texture mapping, said the polygonal visuals had considerable impact. They applauded the gameplay for its variety, challenge, and addictiveness. GameFan awarded it "Best Simulation" game on the Atari Jaguar and "Simulation Game of the Year" in their third Megawards edition. ST Format named it one of the ten best games for the Jaguar.

GamesMaster's Les Ellis lauded the game's detailed polygon graphics, soundscapes, near-perfect gameplay, and fully destructible environment. In 1996, GamesMaster ranked it as number one on their "The GamesMaster Jaguar Top Five". Atari Gaming Headquarters' Keita Iida said that the game's sense of realism was quite refreshing and commended Eclipse Software Design for prioritizing action and smooth frame rate over graphical detail. Electronic Games' John Wesley Hardin thought the game was very fun, highlighting the destructible environment as one of its graphical strengths and audio department. Game Informer's three consultants called it one of the best mech simulations, praising its gameplay, controls, and weapon variety, but lamented the lack of additional texture mapping. Game Informer also awarded it "Best Simulation Game" in their third annual video game awards. Game Zero Magazine's Bryan Carter labelled the game as the best mech simulator for a home console and praised its play controls, story, and smooth graphics, but noted the lack of texture mapping.

Ultimate Future Games called Iron Soldier a minor masterpiece, citing its engaging gameplay and impressive graphics, but found it slow at times. Game Players considered it one of the best Jaguar games, praising its audiovisual department but criticizing the lack of texture mapping and mission variety. Atari World's Iain Laskey praised the game's visuals for its sense of three-dimensionality, soundscapes, and fun gameplay, but criticized the lack of additional missions. Edge commented positively on the game's variety of missions and enemies, as well as the Amiga-style gameplay and visuals.

Computer and Video Games' Gary Lord and Mark Patterson found it passable but unimpressive compared to Metal Head in terms of gameplay and visuals. They remarked that the control method was far from intuitive, movement was unresponsive at times, and missions were often unclear as to how the objective should be completed. Games World gave positive remarks to the polygonal graphics, challenging missions and free-roaming environment, but ultimately felt the game was too limited. Electronic Gaming Monthly's Mike Weigand said the controls were difficult to get used to, but praised the polygon visuals and the ability to choose which stage to play. VideoGames' Jim Loftus initially found the game irritating due to the controls, but noted that changing the settings made it enjoyable and commended its audiovisual presentation. Next Generation's brief review assessed it as "just plain, good old-fashioned destruction". According to internal documentation from Atari, the game had sold 21,240 copies by April 1, 1995.

=== Retrospective coverage ===
In retrospectives, Iron Soldier has been listed among the best Jaguar games by GamesTM, Retro Gamer, HobbyConsolas, and Time Extension. The Atari Times' Gregory D. George praised the game's colorful graphics, smooth frame rate, soundscapes, and addictive gameplay. However, he criticized the lack of texture mapping and noted that the controls can be complicated but easy to get used to. AllGame's Kyle Knight lauded the game for having some of the best visuals on the Jaguar. He also commended its intense gameplay, complex yet intuitive control scheme, and replay value, but expressed disappointment regarding the audio design. Retro Gamer felt that the game showed off the Jaguar's capabilities, while PCMag proclaimed that "Few Jaguar games pull off polygonal 3D graphics as well as Iron Soldier".

== Legacy ==
Following the release of Iron Soldier, Atari requested a sequel on Atari Jaguar CD and was announced by Eclipse Software Design in 1995. However, between 1995 and 1996, Atari laid off key staff, which included the departure of Sean Patten, and stopped releasing Atari Jaguar titles. Iron Soldier 2 was completed and sub-licensed by Atari to Telegames, and released in 1997 after the Jaguar had been discontinued. A third and final entry, Iron Soldier 3, was developed in parallel and released for PlayStation and Nuon. In 2009, former Eclipse staffer Daniel "Dan" Hericks showed off a puzzle game project based on the Iron Soldier series for Atari Lynx at E-JagFest, an event dedicated to the Jaguar scene.
