= Iron Soldier 3 =

2000 video game

- Developer: Eclipse Software Design
- Publishers: PlayStation: NA: Vatical Entertainment; DE/UK: Telegames; VM Labs (Nuon)
- Director: Marc Rosocha
- Designer: Marc Rosocha
- Programmer: Gerhard Seiler
- Artist: Daniel Hericks
- Composers: Harald Riegler; Peter Steinkellner
- Series: Iron Soldier
- Platforms: PlayStation, Nuon
- Release: PlayStation: NA: June 14, 2000; DE: October 2000; UK: November 2000; Nuon: NA: May 2001
- Genre: Mech simulation
- Modes: Single-player, multiplayer

Iron Soldier 3 is a 2000 mech simulation video game developed by Eclipse Software Design for the PlayStation and Nuon. It was published by Vatical Entertainment and VM Labs in North America, and by Telegames in Europe. It is the third and final entry in the Iron Soldier series. Set in a future where industrialization has covered much of the Earth, the player takes part in an elite defense force piloting a robot to protect the United Republic against terrorist activities by PENTA. The player is tasked with various objectives while fighting enemies in multiple missions.

After the release of Iron Soldier 2, Eclipse Software approached Sony to work on PlayStation and came close to a deal to publish Iron Soldier 3 as a first-party title, but this was cancelled at the last minute, leading to a deal being signed with Vatical Entertainment and Telegames, while a Nuon version was made for VM Labs. Most of the team was scattered across countries and wanted to retain, but not break, the core gameplay they established on the Atari Jaguar.

Iron Soldier 3 received a mixed reception from critics, with many divided over various aspects such as the audiovisual presentation, gameplay, controls, and multiplayer. It was the last Eclipse title to be released, as founder Marc Rosocha moved on to other endeavors. In 2021, a licensed re-release of the Nuon version was made by publisher Songbird Productions.

== Gameplay ==
The player's Iron Soldier takes down a building (PlayStation version shown)

Following the gameplay of its predecessors, Iron Soldier 3 is a mech simulation game played from a first-person perspective. The premise is set in a future in which industrialization has covered much of the Earth, where corporate conglomerates use military force to topple governments and establish a global military dictatorship. The United Republic (UR), one of the last independent states, defends itself against a hostile takeover by PENTA. The player partakes in an elite defense force piloting the Iron Soldier robot to protect the UR and stop terrorist activities.

The player can choose one of three unit types, each with its own advantages and disadvantages: the Iron Soldier robot, as well as the light Satyr and the powerful CE-Tech walkers. Each mech also has its own special features: the Iron Soldier can fly with a jetpack for a short time period, the Satyr can hide using an invisibility device, and the CE-Tech can create a destructive force field. The player has to fulfill mission objectives ranging from collecting supplies, defending cities against enemy forces or protecting convoys. There are 25 missions in total, each available in groups of four, while the last five missions must be played in sequential order. The unit's loadout can be customized on a mount before each mission, and mounting the same weapon multiple times allows for a greater amount of ammo, but some weapons are restricted to specific mounts. New weapons are earned by successfully completing missions, including a flamethrower and a time bomb.

The player controls the mech in a three-dimensional environment with destructible buildings while fighting enemies. The player can walk forward or backward, look, turn, fire weapons, hit buildings or enemies with the Iron Soldier's hand manipulator, stomp ground vehicles, and intercept enemy fire. Destroying warehouses, fuel tanks, and bunkers yields crates containing extra ammo, energy repair, or items like a spy drone, infravision, and speed up. An advanced control method can be enabled that separates the torso from the legs to walk in a direction and aim at enemies. If the Iron Soldier is destroyed or a mission fails, the player can retry using the continue option and return to mission selection. Progress is manually saved by completing each mission, however, the Nuon version uses a password system. Two players can participate in single-player missions in co-op; one controls the weapon systems while the other steers the mech. There is also an arcade mode where the goal is to destroy the city in the fastest time possible or duel another player in a split-screen deathmatch.

== Development ==
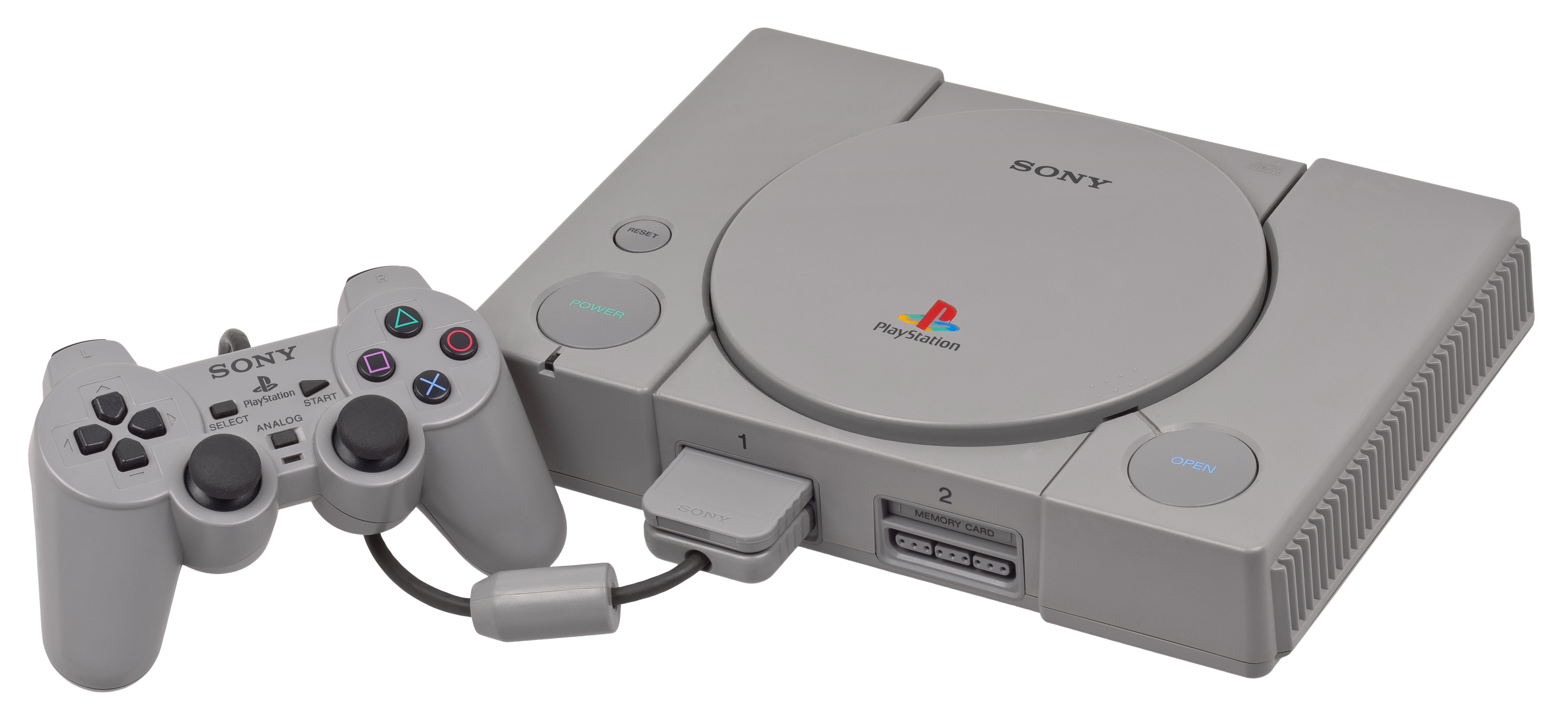
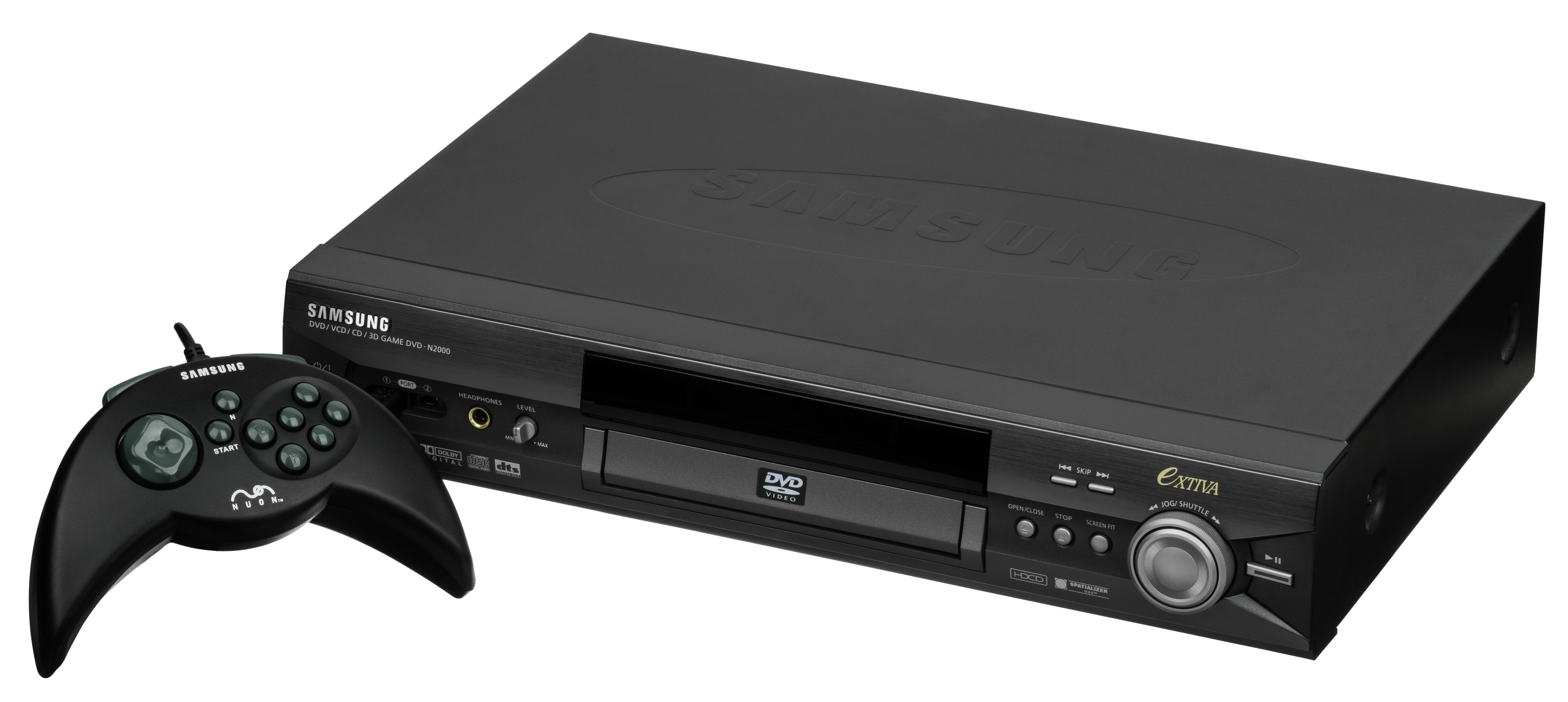
Eclipse Software Design developed Iron Soldier 3 in parallel for PlayStation (left) and the Nuon (right)

Iron Soldier 3 was developed by German studio Eclipse Software Design, which previously worked on Iron Soldier and its sequel for Atari Jaguar. After the release of Iron Soldier 2, Eclipse Software founder Marc Rosocha approached Sony to work on PlayStation and Bill Rehbock, a former Atari staffer at Sony, sent development kits for Eclipse. Rosocha explained that Eclipse was close to reaching an agreement with Sony to publish the game as a first-party title, but it was cancelled at the last minute, leading to a deal being signed with Vatical Entertainment and Telegames. Eclipse also made a Nuon version for VM Labs, a California-based semiconductor company founded by Richard Miller with former Atari and Sony staff.

Most of the Iron Soldier 3 team were dispersed between countries such as Germany and Austria. Rosocha acted as the game's director and designer, while the Nuon version was produced by Joe Sousa, who worked on several Jaguar titles such as Cybermorph and Kasumi Ninja. Gerhard Seiler served as lead programmer, with Maik Guntermann providing additional coding. Daniel Hericks was responsible for the graphics, while the music was scored by Harald Riegler and Peter Steinkellner. The full-motion video (FMV) sequences were done by graphic artist Johannes Graf, his first professional video game project, using a driver created by Eclipse. Johannes became involved in the project when his brother Roland discussed with Rosocha about obtaining a development kit to port Native to the Nuon and contacted him.

The team wanted to preserve, but not break, the core gameplay they created on the Jaguar. To counter criticism that the game moved slowly, they added faster walker mechs. Eclipse eschewed software tool libraries provided by Sony and instead relied on directly programming its own routines for the PlayStation hardware to ensure high performance and better visual quality, avoiding texture warping and clipping errors. The game's engine, which Rosocha compared to Twisted Metal and Vigilante 8, allowed for special effects not commonly seen on PlayStation, such as lighting and shadows on buildings, as well as weather effects. The team worked on the PlayStation and Nuon versions in parallel for nearly two years but struggled to finish the game before VM Labs ran out of funding.

== Release ==
Iron Soldier 3 was first announced by Vatical Entertainment and Telegames for the PlayStation at E3 1999, with a release date planned for winter 1999. The game was released for PlayStation in North America by Vatical Entertainment on June 14, 2000, followed by Germany in October 2000 and United Kingdom in November 2000 by Telegames. A Japanese publisher contacted Eclipse Software to localize it for Japan, however Rosocha declined the offer due to the publisher's proposal to make it faster and allow mechs to fly.

Iron Soldier 3 was showcased by VM Labs as one of the first software titles for the Nuon at CES 2000. The Nuon version saw a very limited retail release in May 2001, as it was withdrawn by VM Labs due to a bug that caused incompatibility with certain Nuon-enabled DVD players. It was never re-released due to VM Labs' financial issues, however a number of demo copies were distributed for free by Kevin Manne of the fansite Nuon-Dome.

A port titled Iron Soldier 3+ was in development for PC, PlayStation 2 and Xbox, but was later cancelled. Iron Soldier 3 is the final entry in the Iron Soldier series and the last Eclipse title to be released. During an interview regarding the Nuon version of Native, Rosocha stated that there were discussions about making a next-generation Iron Soldier game, but that he was tired of ignoring late payments and the circumstances under which they occurred, moving on to other ventures outside of game development with his company. In 2021, publisher Songbird Productions made a licensed re-release of the Nuon version.

== Reception ==
Reception

Aggregate score
Aggregator	Score
GameRankings	60.67%

Review scores
Publication	Score
AllGame	3.5/5
Electronic Gaming Monthly	5.5/10
EP Daily	4/10
GameSpot	4.3/10
IGN	6.8/10
M! Games	68%
Mega Fun	57%
PlayStation Official Magazine – UK	3/10
Official U.S. PlayStation Magazine	4/5
PlayStation: The Official Magazine	1/5
Video Games (DE)	58%
Play the PlayStation	80%

Iron Soldier 3 received mixed reception from critics, holding a rating of 60.67% based on nine reviews according to review aggregator GameRankings. Official U.S. PlayStation Magazine's John Davison found the game's mission structure rewarding thanks to the responsive controls and excellent visuals, but found the two-player co-op mode, while immersive, to be a bit slow and noted its steep learning curve. Play the PlayStation's Martin Weidner praised the game's balanced level design, enemy AI, and controls suited for both novice and advanced players, but saw the high difficulty level to be a negative. AllGame's Nick Woods thought the game was enjoyable, commending its graphics and soundscapes, but felt the single-player campaigns became repetitive after a while.

GamePro's Vicious Sid highlighted the game's detailed environments and addictive gameplay, but found the techno music forgettable and the control scheme complicated. IGN's David Smith found Iron Soldier 3 visually faithful to previous entries on the Atari Jaguar, and commended its variety of missions and mechs, but felt it did not compare to Gungriffon on the Sega Saturn and the multiplayer mode was flawed due to its slow pacing. MAN!AC's David Mohr commented favorably on the game's graphics, but criticized its unspectacular mission parameters, irrelevant story, and sluggish controls. Video Games' Alexander Olma wrote that the game was fun but cited issues with its monotonous gameplay and controls, while Mega Fun's Georg Döller commended the audiovisual presentation but stated that it became monotonous and failed to deliver on its promise.

Electronic Gaming Monthly's Crispin Boyer said that the two-player co-op mode was an interesting novelty, but found its gameplay average and visuals bland. GameSpot's Miguel Lopez made positive comments about the game's CG sequences and controls, but faulted its rough graphics, dull soundscapes, and lackluster weapons. The Electric Playground's Mandip Sandhu gave positive remarks to the game's video sequences and audio, but criticized the walker mechs for being useless, multiplayer modes and sluggish playability, recommending Armored Core or MechWarrior instead. Official UK PlayStation Magazine's Paul Rose panned the drab visuals and flawed controls, writing that "Iron Soldier 3 can join its predecessors on the scrap heap of obscurity". PSM stated that the game came across as "ugly, slow and uninspired", lambasting its grainy graphics and controls.
