= Boggle (disambiguation) =

Boggle can refer to:

- Boggle, a word game
- Boggle (video game), a video game based on the word game of the same name
- Bogle, boggle or bogill, a Northumbrian and Scots term for a ghost or folkloric being
- Boggart, a creature in English folklore

== See also ==
- Biggle (disambiguation)
