= Psychedelia (light synthesizer) =

1984 light synthesizer program

- ZX Spectrum version
- Original authors: Jeff Minter; Simon Freeman
- Initial release: 1984; 42 years ago
- Written in: Assembly
- Platform: Commodore 64, VIC-20, Commodore 16, ZX Spectrum, MSX, Amstrad CPC 464
- Type: Light synthesizer
- Licence: Public domain
- Website: www.llamasoft.co.uk/psychedelia.php

Psychedelia is a light synthesizer developed by Jeff Minter and published by Llamasoft in 1984. It was converted to MSX and ZX Spectrum by Simon Freeman.

== Usage ==
Psychedelia allowed a user to generate a light show on the screen grid, using the joystick to send pulses or bursts of coloured squares. There are various preset settings, or the user can manually set the variables controlling the pulses. Patterns can be recorded to memory or tape for later playback.

Unlike Minter's later synthesizers such as Neon, Psychedelia does not use audio as a factor, only using a joystick's input. It is, however, intended to be played in accompaniment to music.

== Development ==
Minter had been considering "dynamic interactive pattern generators" but hadn't written any previously. An idea for an algorithm came to him, in which patterns would be seeded along a path, which would then expand and change shape and colour over time. He coded it in 6502 assembly language, fitting into about 1 kilobyte. Running the code for the first time had a profound effect on Minter: "It just felt wonderfully new, and somehow primal... it was like the patterns and mandalas that have fascinated humans for millennia, but come to life, under your control..."

Originally, Minter intended the algorithm to be public domain and contributed an early version in listing form to a computer magazine. After encouragement from his parents, Minter eventually released an expanded version commercially as Psychedelia. He continued to develop the light synthesizer concept, designing Colourspace (1985), Trip-a-Tron (1987), Virtual Light Machine (1990, 1994, 2000 and an unreleased version in 2003), and Neon (2004).

Psychedelia, along with other older Llamasoft programs, has since become public domain software. Later the author released a variant for Pebble devices.

== Reception ==
On its release Psychedelia received mixed reviews. Your Spectrum criticized the concept of a light synthesizer, describing Psychedelia as boring and awarding an average of 2/5. Sinclair User also only awarded 2 out of 5, finding the concept interesting but concluding that the games-buying public was the wrong demographic for this kind of software. In contrast, CRASH found the package great fun to play around with, describing the effects as fantastic, but criticizing the retail price and narrow appeal. The magazine featured Psychedelia on their October 1991 covertape.

== See also ==
- Trip-a-Tron
- Virtual Light Machine
- Neon (light synthesizer)
