= Rubik's Games =

1999 video game

- Developer: Androsoft
- Publisher: Hasbro Interactive
- Platform: Windows 95/98
- Release: September 1999
- Genre: Puzzle
- Mode: Single-player

Rubik's Games is a five-games-in-one PC game created for Windows 95/98, developed in part by Ernő Rubik with Androsoft, and published by Hasbro Interactive.

== Gameplay ==
The collection presents five distinct puzzle activities built around variations of the Rubik's Cube concept. Rubik's Classic offers a 3D cube that can be manipulated on-screen, allowing players to twist, rotate, and reset it at will, and it includes optional challenges such as solving the cube within a set number of moves. Stack Up centers on arranging falling tiles into correct positions, requiring players to place pieces in ways that complete patterns and clear space. Rubik's Playground involves guiding balls through paths and obstacles, directing their movement to reach intended goals. Zigthrough functions as a slow-paced 3D block‑matching game in which pieces descend and must be aligned to clear them. Paint War has players compete to cover territory with color, attempting to claim more of the playfield than the opponent.

== Development ==
Rubik's Games was developed by Androsoft, a company founded in 1996.

== Reception ==
Reception

Review scores
Publication	Score
All Game Guide	3.5/5
FamilyPC	90%
IGN	7.5/10
PC Player	58%
Review Corner	4.5/5

All Game Guide gave Rubik's Games a score of 3.5 out of 5.

== See also ==
- Rubik's Puzzle World
- Atari Video Cube
