= Trip-a-Tron =

Light synthesizer written by Jeff Minter

- Original author: Jeff Minter
- Developer: Llamasoft
- Initial release: 1988; 38 years ago
- Written in: Assembly
- Platform: Atari ST, Amiga
- Type: Light synthesizer
- License: Commercial, shareware
- Website: minotaurproject.co.uk/ttron.php

Trip-a-Tron is a light synthesizer written by Jeff Minter and published through his Llamasoft company in 1988. It was originally written for the Atari ST and later ported to the Amiga in 1990 by Andy Fowler.

== Description ==
Trip-A-Tron was released as shareware with no limitations. Upon registering the software, the purchaser was sent a packaged version with a 3-ring bound manual, which was essential to learn the scripting language "KML" (supposedly "Keyboard Macro Language") which drove the system.

The software has a quirky user interface, filled with in-jokes and references to Llamasoft mascots. For example, the button to exit from the MIDI editor is labelled "naff off", while the button to exit the file display is labelled with a sheep saying "Baa!"; the waveform editor colour cycles the words "Dead cool" above the waveform display, and the event sequencer displays an icon of a camel smoking a cigarette; and the image manipulation tool has a series of icons used to indicate how long the current operation is going to take: "Make the tea", "Have a fag", "Go to bed", "Go to sleep", "Go on holiday", "Go to Peru for six months", and "RIP"; and the scripting language command to set the length of drawn lines is "LLAMA". (The manual states: "I could have called the command LINELENGTH I suppose, but I like llamas so what the heck".)

In spite of this the software is extremely usable and was recommended as one of the best light synthesizers available at the time.

== See also ==
- Psychedelia (light synthesizer)
- Virtual Light Machine
- Neon (light synthesizer)
