= Neon (music visualization) =

Neon is a music visualization program developed by Jeff Minter ('Yak') and Ivan Zorzin ('Giles'). It was based on an enhanced version of the graphics engine originally to be included in Unity, which became an independent project after Unity was cancelled in 2004.

A version of Neon is used as the default music visualization for the Xbox 360. The authors have retained the rights to implement the software on other platforms and contexts (a Microsoft Windows version was due in 2006 but the release has been hampered by rights issues).

The Xbox 360 version, implemented into the media player and activated whenever music is played, is actually the "First Wave" of Neon. Up to four people can control it with the same number of gamepads, or it can be run autonomously via the "v-crew" code.

Jeff Minter's Space Giraffe uses the Neon engine, as does Llamasoft's subsequent games Gridrunner Revolution and Minotaur Rescue.

== See also ==
- Psychedelia (light synthesizer)
- Trip-a-Tron
- Virtual Light Machine
