= Biggle =

Biggle or Biggles may refer to:

Biggle

- Lloyd Biggle, Jr. (1923–2002), American musician, author and oral historian

Biggles

- Biggles, James Bigglesworth, fictional pilot and adventurer created by W. E. Johns
- Biggles (film), 1986 sci-fi adventure film, incorporating the Biggles character created by W. E. Johns
- Doctor Biggles-Jones, fictional character from the G.I. Joe and Transformers fictional universe as seen in Marvel Comics
- Biggles, Ontario
- Carl Barât, an English musician known for Dirty Pretty Things and The Libertines, nicknamed 'Biggles' by Peter Doherty
- The Biggles, Billy and Ruby Biggle, the main characters of the Kidsongs videos and TV show
- Ryan Job (1981-2009), United States Navy SEAL who died after medical malpractice in 2009

== See also ==
- Boggle (disambiguation)
