= Iron Soldier 2 =

1997 video game

- Developer: Eclipse Software Design
- Publisher: Telegames
- Producers: John Skruch; Sean Patten; Tal Funke-Bilu; Ted Tahquechi
- Programmers: Marc Rosocha; Michael Bittner
- Artists: András Kavalecz; Bleick Bleicken; Daniel Hericks
- Composers: Joachim Gierveld; Mario Knezović
- Series: Iron Soldier
- Platforms: Atari Jaguar CD; Atari Jaguar
- Release: NA/EU: April 23, 1997 (CD); NA/EU: December 15, 1997 (Cartridge)
- Genre: Mech simulation
- Mode: Single-player

Iron Soldier 2 is a 1997 mech simulation video game developed by Eclipse Software Design and published by Telegames for the Atari Jaguar CD and Atari Jaguar. It is the second entry in the Iron Soldier series. Set after the first game, the player takes part in an elite defense force piloting a robot to protect the United Republic and stop PENTA, a rival to the Iron Fist Corporation seeking to occupy its former territory. The player is tasked with various objectives while fighting enemies in multiple missions.

Following the release of Iron Soldier, Atari sought out developers to make killer apps for Jaguar CD and requested a sequel to the game. Eclipse made Iron Soldier 2 as a cartridge-sized game to fit into the Jaguar's memory and avoid loading times. The team applied large-scale texture mapping by exploiting the Jaguar's color palette memory without losing performance. In 1996, Atari merged with JTS and production of the Jaguar ceased, resulting in the game not being released despite being finished until it was eventually picked up by Telegames.

Iron Soldier 2 received generally favorable reception from critics, with praise for the improved graphics and techno soundtrack. Some reviewers felt that the gameplay was more evolutionary and did not offer enough to be a sequel, while most noted the increased difficulty. Criticism was also directed at the repetitive objectives and lack of additional missions. It was followed by Iron Soldier 3 (2000). Retrospective commentary in the years following its release have hailed it as one of the best titles for the Jaguar.

== Gameplay ==
Like its predecessor, Iron Soldier 2 is a mech simulation game played from a first-person perspective. The premise is set after the first game, when the resistance establishes a democratic government called the United Republic (UR) after the world is liberated with the defeat of the Iron Fist Corporation (IFC). PENTA, a rival corporation to the IFC, seeks to occupy its former territory by attacking and terrorizing the UR. The player participates in an elite defense force by piloting the Iron Soldier (IS) robot to protect the UR and stop terrorist forces.

The player's Iron Soldier (IS) shooting at a running Satyr walker

The player has to fulfill mission objectives ranging from destroying specific targets, escorting convoys, recovering items, defending buildings or finding and eliminating car bombs. There are 20 missions in total, each divided into groups of five. The player customizes the robot's weaponry by mounting them on its shoulders, hips, and hands before each mission. Mounting the same weapon multiple times allows a greater amount of ammo to be carried, but some weapons are restricted to specific mounts. The player can obtain new weapons by successfully completing certain missions. These include a shotgun, a grenade launcher, homing missiles, and a heavy machine gun.

The player controls the IS in a three-dimensional environment with destructible objects while fighting enemies. The game introduces new enemies to the series, such as fighter jets, transport aircraft, fast attack vehicles, and the two-legged Satyr walkers. The player can walk forward or backward, look, turn, and fire weapons. The player can also hit buildings or enemies with the hand manipulator and stomp on houses, tanks and trees. Destroying buildings yields crates containing ammo refills or repair kits. The player can enable an advanced control method that decouples the movement of the IS from its head orientation and allows looking without changing course. If the IS is destroyed or a mission fails, the player can retry using the continue option and return to mission selection. Progress is manually saved by successfully completing each mission, however the Atari Jaguar CD version requires a Memory Track cartridge. The Satyr walker can also be played but only by entering a cheat code in the options menu.

== Development ==
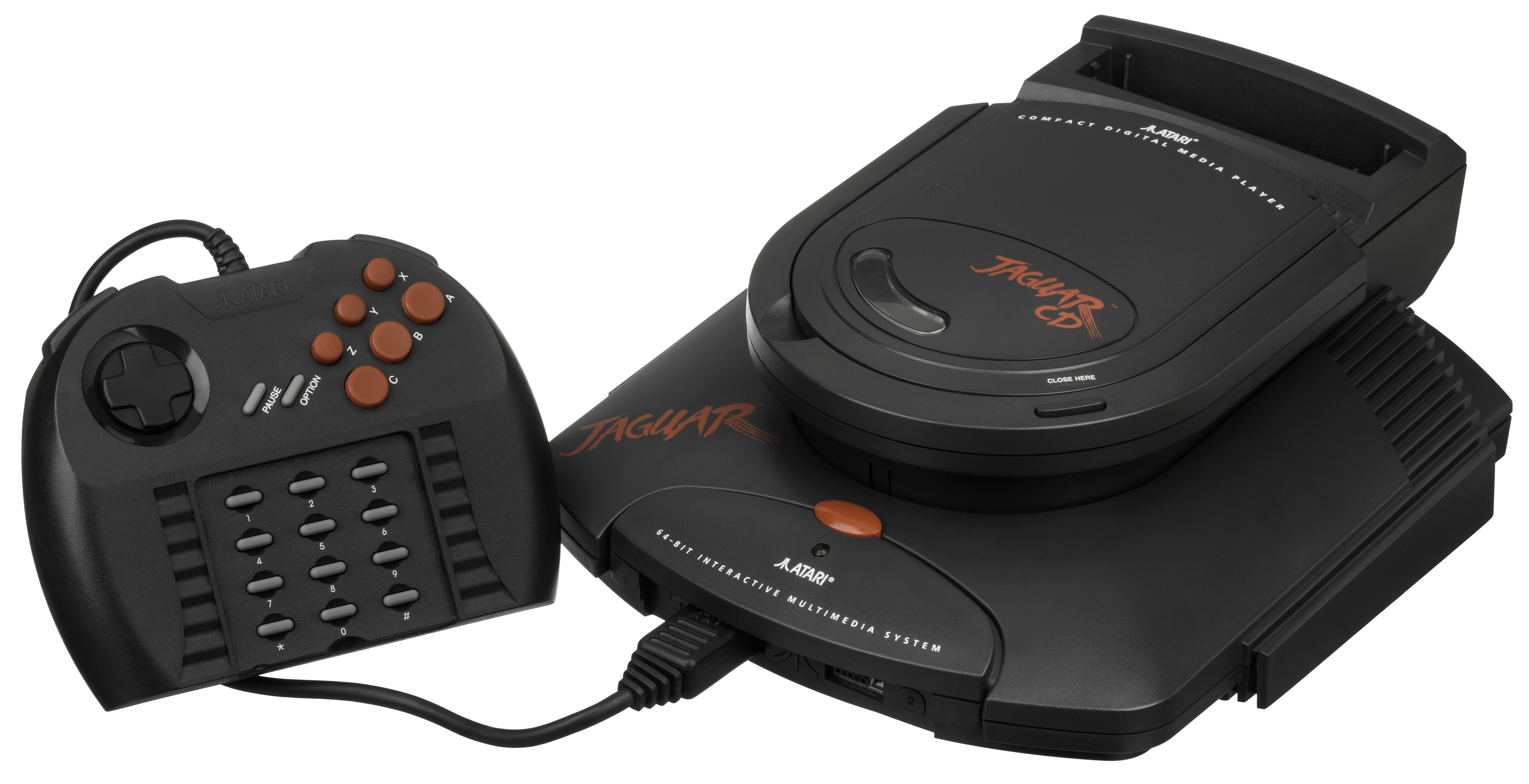
Eclipse Software Design developed Iron Soldier 2 for Atari Jaguar CD as a ROM to fit into the Atari Jaguar's memory and avoid loading times

Iron Soldier 2 was developed by German studio Eclipse Software Design, which previously worked on Iron Soldier. Following the release of the first Iron Soldier, Atari sought out developers to make killer apps for the Atari Jaguar CD. Atari requested a sequel to the game, Eclipse received a Jaguar CD prototype unit and the team went to work on the project. It was co-produced by John Skruch, Sean Patten, Tal Funke-Bilu and Ted Tahquechi, who worked on several Jaguar titles such as Highlander: The Last of the MacLeods and I-War (1995). Marc Rosocha and Michael Bittner were co-responsible for the game's programming. Artwork for the game was done by András Kavalecz, Bleick Bleicken and Daniel Hericks. The soundtrack was scored by Joachim Gierveld and Mario Knezović.

Rosocha explained that the game was made as a cartridge-sized ROM in the Alpine development kit to fit into the Atari Jaguar's memory and avoid loading times, only using the CD format for full-motion video (FMV) and music tracks. The team discovered a process to apply large-scale texture mapping for more detailed cityscapes and enemy units by exploiting the Jaguar's color palette memory to double the texture buffering speed without losing performance. The new enemies and weapons were created by Patten via 3D Studio before being handed over to Eclipse for integration into the game. According to BattleSphere designer Scott Le Grand, Eclipse wanted to implement a two-player network mode in the game and Atari requested a working networking code, but the feature was removed in the final version.

The game was nearing completion, but Rosocha reached out to Skruch after speaking to Attention to Detail (ATD) about Atari exiting the console market. Skruch told Rosocha that the Jaguar did not sell as well as Atari had hoped, but assured him that the project was not in jeopardy. In November 1995, Atari laid off key production personnel, including Patten's departure. Production of the game lasted twelve months and was ready in early 1996, however, Rosocha received information from Skruch that new Jaguar projects were suspended and confirmed that Atari was abandoning the console market to merge with JTS. In fall 1996, Telegames contacted Rosocha and expressed interest in licensing the game, which still had to undergo an extensive testing phase before being mastered. All the work fell to Rosocha, who understood the source code besides Bittner, who left for Synetic after the game was cancelled. Rosocha spent three months testing and fixing errors before submitting a master CD for authorization to Atari in late 1996. Rosocha has since said that Iron Soldier 2 would have been completed sooner if they had not been making it for both cartridge and CD formats.

== Release ==
Iron Soldier 2 was first announced by Eclipse Software Design with a planned release in the fourth quarter of 1995. A demo was presented at the 1995 ECTS Spring event, but the game was delayed until January 1996. The game was featured at Atari during "Fun 'n' Games Day", an event to show upcoming Atari Jaguar titles to journalists, but was later scheduled for release in March 1996. That same year, Atari merged with JTS and ceased production of the Jaguar, but agreed to continue supporting the Jaguar as part of the merger. Telegames subsequently sub-licensed the game from Atari along with several titles for the console. By this time, Telegames was one of the last remaining third-party publishers for Jaguar.

Iron Soldier 2 was slated for February 1997, but technical issues with CD replication delayed the release date to April 23, 1997. Being a late release for the Atari Jaguar CD, it was only available through direct order from Telegames and Electronics Boutique. In France, the game was distributed by La Terre du Milieu. On December 15, 1997, Telegames released a stripped-down cartridge version for the Jaguar, with full-motion video (FMV) sequences and redbook audio removed due to memory limitations. Production on PC and PlayStation versions of the game began in a limited capacity. Telegames sought a major publisher for the PC and PlayStation versions while Marc Rosocha approached Sega about porting the game to Sega Saturn, but was told that the Saturn would not be a success and might end up in a similar situation to Atari.

== Reception ==
Reception

Review scores
Publication	Score
AllGame	4/5
Atari Gaming Headquarters	9/10
Digital Press	8.5/10
Jaguar Explorer Online	5/5

Iron Soldier 2 received generally favorable reviews from critics. Jaguar Explorer Online lauded the game for having some of the best graphics on the Atari Jaguar. They also celebrated its soundscapes, excellent control setup and gameplay, but noted the increased difficulty and lack of additional missions, and lamented the loss of in-game music in the cartridge version. Atari Gaming Headquarters' Keita Iida praised the game's audiovisual department, but felt that the gameplay, while fun, was more evolutionary than revolutionary and found it more difficult than the original Iron Soldier. GamePro's Dan Amrich commended the texture-mapped polygonal graphics and energetic soundtrack, writing that "If this high-quality game had been released during Atari's life span, the Jaguar might have survived a little longer".

Digital Press' Edward Villalpando felt that the sequel improved on the formula of the original Iron Soldier, citing better texture mapping, new enemies, and more action overall, but pointed out its relentless difficulty. AllGame's Kyle Knight praised the improved audiovisual presentation over its predecessor, as well as the fun gameplay and replay value, but felt that Iron Soldier 2 did not offer enough to be a great sequel and found its difficulty challenging. ST-Computer's Helge Bollinger commended the refined graphics, soundscapes, good controls and varied missions, stating that the game "can not only keep up with the competition from other systems, but can easily outdo them in terms of gameplay". Alain Coadec of the French ST Magazine gave positive remarks to the game's detailed environments, techno soundtrack, enjoyable playability, and overall longevity, but saw the high difficulty and repetitive objectives as negative points.

In retrospectives, Iron Soldier 2 has been listed among the best Jaguar games by Retro Gamer, HobbyConsolas, and Comic Book Resources. The Atari Times' Gregory D. George found the audiovisual presentation better overall, but expressed disappointment that the game, while enjoyable on its own, was the same as the first Iron Soldier. Brett Daly of Jaguar Front Page News (a part of the GameSpy network) lauded the improved graphics, soundtrack and weapon selection over the original Iron Soldier, but highlighted the game's increased difficulty. Reviewing the game in 2006, neXGam called it one of the most visually beautiful Jaguar games and commended its non-linear missions, but noted that the controls take some getting used to and that the slow gameplay may not be for everyone, while the lack of innovations compared to its predecessor was seen as a negative. Retro Gamer stated that the game had improved greatly compared to the first game, with more extensive texture mapping, a longer draw distance, more advanced missions, and a new mech.
