= Sorry! (video game) =

1998 video game

- Developers: Third-I Productions; Mondo Media (Cutscenes and production)
- Publisher: Hasbro Interactive
- Platform: Windows
- Release: March 12, 1998
- Modes: Single-player, Up to 4-players

Sorry! is a 1998 video game based on the board game of the same name. It offers classic Sorry! and a mode called Way Sorry!, where new cards are introduced, including Bully, Buddy, Punish, and Happy. The animated pawns talk, joke, and make amusing remarks during gameplay that relate to the colors' personalities. There are cutscenes as well, which show what happens afterward when a specific color wins. Rules are identical to normal play; however, there are some options for "house rules", such as being allowed to bump teammates. Both the Classic (playing cards drawn) and Strategy (playing cards from hand) games are available.

In addition to normal play, the game provides an extra deck of cards called Way Sorry!. Along with the 45 standard cards, this deck adds nine new cards. These cards are unique to this version of the game. The player can choose to play with the extra cards or not. The "Way Sorry!" deck includes the following:

Happy	Makes one pawn immune to being moved or attacked for one turn, much like stepping in the Safety Zone. This can cause enemy pawns to be obstructed or simply not allow them to make the best move. It also prevents pawns from sliding, if the invincible pawn is on a slide. Pawns are not eligible for this card if they are in Start or the Safety Zone. This card also allows the player to draw again.
Punish	Prevents one opponent's pawn from moving for one turn. This does not protect it from being moved or attacked. Cannot be used against a pawn in Start or the Safety Zone; but if the pawn is sent back to Start before its turn comes around, it remains punished. This card allows another draw.
Buddy	Moves any pawn on the outside track to the space beside the nearest pawn in either direction.
Bully	Moves any pawn on the outside track to the nearest pawn in either direction and bumps it.
Way Sorry!	Identical to the Sorry! card. However, with the Way Sorry! card, the player must continue bumping pawns until either the board is cleared of opponents or the player's Start is empty.

There are two each of the first four cards, and one "Way Sorry!" card.

When the Player or Computer player wins the game, they can watch a cutscene, animated by Mondo Media, who at the time animated cutscenes for other Hasbro Interactive titles like Centipede and Nerf Arena Blast.

== Multiplayer ==
The game also allows up to four players to play at the same time, taking turns. There is also a mode to play over a network. Additionally, a zero-player (all-CPU) game can be played.

== Reception ==
Charles Ardai of Computer Gaming World gave the game 3/4 stars and described it as a cute children's game, while noting that adults would enjoy more involved board games.
