= Centipede (1998 video game) =

1998 video game

- North American Windows cover art
- Developer: Leaping Lizard Software (Note: Ported to PlayStation by Real Sports Games and Macintosh by Westlake Interactive)
- Publisher: Hasbro Interactive (Note: MacSoft published the Macintosh version.)
- Producer: Jeff Buccellato
- Designer: Richard Rouse III
- Series: Centipede
- Platforms: Windows, PlayStation, Dreamcast, Mac
- Release: October 23, 1998: Windows; NA: October 23, 1998; EU: 1998 PlayStation; NA/EU: June 1, 1999 Dreamcast; NA: November 23, 1999 Mac May 2001
- Genre: Shoot 'em up
- Modes: Single-player, multiplayer

Centipede is a 1998 shoot 'em up video game developed by Leaping Lizard Software and a remake of Atari, Inc.'s 1981 arcade game of the same name. It was published by Hasbro Interactive, their first under the Atari label after purchasing the brand and former assets.

Gameplay consists of a series of rounds that are completed once the player eliminates the centipede(s) that wind down the playing field. Obstacles such as spiders, fleas, and scorpions complicate the game. At the same time, a population of mushrooms grows between the player and each centipede. Optionally, the player is tasked with rescuing villagers and bystanders and preventing damage to key structures; although ignoring these tasks does not prevent the player from being able to complete the round regardless.

== Gameplay ==
Screenshots of the original version (bottom) and the 1998 sequel (top)

The game can be played in two game modes: "Arcade" and "Adventure" — the latter marking a departure from the original version. Arcade mode allows the player to experience a ported version of the original arcade Centipede, with some enhancements.

In the adventure campaign, one completes a series of levels linked by a storyline. Here, the player encounters both the original enemies (centipede, spider, flea, scorpion, poisonous mushroom) and a new array as well (dragonfly, butterfly, firebug, icebug, killer mushroom, etc.), some of which are capable of throwing projectiles to destroy the shooter, and others capable of altering mushrooms. If an enemy or projectile contacts the shooter, the player loses a life.

=== Campaign story ===
Even though the graphics were 3D, they consisted of simple geometrical si shapes. There is the hexagonal head of the scorpion, as seen in the game.

The story centers around a collective of villages known as "Weedom" and a prophecy that foretells their imminent destruction. Each century, an army of large insects invades Weedom at the hands of their leader, the Queen Pede. The player assumes the role of Wally Gudmunzsun, who is tasked with the destruction of the invading insect army, while piloting a craft known simply as "The Shooter".

== Development and release ==
Centipede was conceived by Hasbro Interactive, the video gaming arm of Hasbro, following its purchase of former Atari Corporation assets from JTS. Development was done by Leaping Lizard Software, a small firm based in Maryland.

Released for Microsoft Windows, it was ported to PlayStation, Dreamcast, and later Macintosh.

== Reception ==
Reception

Aggregate score
Aggregator	Score			
Aggregator	Dreamcast	Macintosh	PC	PS
GameRankings	54%	N/A	64%	59%

Review scores
Publication	Score			
Publication	Dreamcast	Macintosh	PC	PS
AllGame	2/5	N/A	N/A	N/A
CNET Gamecenter	N/A	N/A	N/A	7/10
Computer Games Strategy Plus	N/A	N/A	4.5/5	N/A
Computer Gaming World	N/A	N/A	3.5/5	N/A
Electronic Gaming Monthly	4.625/10 (Note: Two critics of Electronic Gaming Monthly gave the Dreamcast version each a score of 4/10, one gave it 4.5/10, and the other gave it 6/10.)	N/A	N/A	3.875/10 (Note: In Electronic Gaming Monthly's review of the PlayStation version, one critic gave it a score of 2.5/10, another gave it 6/10, and the rest gave it each a score of 3.5/10.)
Game Informer	N/A	N/A	N/A	7/10
GameFan	N/A	N/A	N/A	58% (Note: In GameFan's viewpoint of the PlayStation version, three critics gave it each a score of 65, 62, and 48.)
GameRevolution	N/A	N/A	B	D
GameSpot	5.5/10	N/A	6.9/10	5.3/10
GameSpy	3.5/10	N/A	N/A	N/A
IGN	2.9/10	N/A	7.6/10	5.5/10
MacLife	N/A	"Spiffy"	N/A	N/A
Next Generation	3/5	N/A	N/A	3/5
Official U.S. PlayStation Magazine	N/A	N/A	N/A	1/5
The Cincinnati Enquirer	N/A	N/A	1/4	N/A

The game received mixed reviews on all platforms according to the review aggregation website GameRankings. Chris Charla of NextGen said of the PlayStation version in its September 1999 issue, "A solid 3D shooter with a nice, if young, story makes this a great game for your little brother, but don't be surprised if you find yourself playing a few games, too." Five issues later, Adam Pavlacka said that the Dreamcast version "may look good in 3D, but the classic version of the game is still more fun." GamePro said of the same Dreamcast version: "Who will dig on Centipede, and who will bag on it? Old schoolers will feel the pull of sentimentality, and may find themselves caught up in the newer, fiercer version of Centipede contained within. Twitch[y] gamers will also enjoy Centipede, but anyone not in those two classes may find the game tiresome and repetitive. Give Centipede a chance, you might just catch the bug." (Note: GamePro gave the Dreamcast version 4.5/5 for graphics, 3.5/5 for sound, and two 4/5 scores for control and fun factor.)

The PC version won Computer Games Strategy Plus' 1998 "Classic Game of the Year" award. The staff praised the graphics, addictive gameplay and the game's enhancements.
