= Faroudja =

- Headquarters: San Francisco, California, United States

Faroudja Labs was a San Francisco–based IP and research company founded by Yves Faroudja. Faroudja Labs shouldn't be confused with Faroudja Enterprises, Yves Faroudja's latest venture.

Faroudja specialized in video processing algorithms and products. Its technologies for deinterlacing and inverse telecine have received acclaim within the consumer electronics industry and have been widely used in many electronic devices, such as TV sets, set-top boxes, and video processors.

Efforts by Faroudja generated more than 65 patents and provided technology licenses to consumer electronics companies, and helped receive three Technology & Engineering Emmy Awards (one for advanced encoding techniques, a lifetime achievement for Yves Faroudja, and one for HDTV upconversion used in network broadcast applications), as well as numerous other awards.

Since 2007, the Faroudja brand and all associated video processing IPs are part of STMicroelectronics, an international semiconductor company, which now uses the technology in System-on-Chip (SoC) products.

== History ==
Founded by Yves and Isabel Faroudja in 1971, Faroudja Inc. specialized in video quality improvement, particularly for VCRs, and soon became an acknowledged leader in this field. By 1973, their patents were licensed by various household names in the consumer electronics and broadcast industries.

Faroudja was notable for co-development of the Hi-8 and S-VHS standards in 1987–1988.

In the 1980s, the company developed technologies for the deinterlacing of NTSC signals, including motion adaptive processing algorithms. In 1989, Faroudja invented and patented film mode detection, also known as inverse 3:2 pulldown detection. Faroudja was the only company in the world that had the ability to detect the original frames of the film within the video stream and reconstruct an accurate image, free of motion artifacts containing full vertical resolution.

In 1991, the company created the first professional grade line doubler (480p) (deinterlacer) which incorporated this technology, for use with large CRT projectors used in Hollywood screening rooms and large home theaters. The highly acclaimed LD1 Line Doubler takes standard definition signals and converts them to higher resolutions with improved image quality, free of the usual NTSC artifacts (cross-color and cross luminance). At the same time, Faroudja started manufacturing products based on the same technologies, including adaptive comb filters and video quality improvement products for use with Sony's U-Matic video recorders. This technology was a key factor in the growth of the home theater industry. Faroudja's adaptive comb filter technology was recognized with a Technology & Engineering Emmy Award in 1991.

Improvements in display device technologies drove the requirement for more advanced video processing and scaling. This included the introduction of a new product type called the VP400 Line Quadrupler (480i upconverted to 960p). In 2000 Faroudja introduced the industry's first line doubler for HDTV (1080i upconverted to 1080p). The LD1, the VP400, the DVP5000, DVP3000 and Native Rate Series have made Faroudja the benchmark by which all other video processing is compared. For his lifetime's work, Yves Faroudja was awarded the prestigious Lifetime Achievement Emmy in Technology and Engineering, presented in 1998.

The Digital Format Translator (DFT) was introduced in 1998 as a standard definition to high definition converter (480i upconverted to 720p or 1080i) for broadcast TV stations. This processor won Faroudja Labs a third Emmy award in 2001 for its efforts in HDTV processing.

As TVs began to make the transition from analog CRTs to digital fixed-pixel displays Display resolution, Faroudja Labs made the transition from manufacturing complete systems to designing integrated circuits for use in TV and other video products.

In 2000, Faroudja was acquired by Sage, Inc. which in turn was acquired by Genesis Microchip in 2002. Faroudja's growth in integrated circuits expanded with design-wins in various consumer electronics products such as DVD players, projectors, AV Receivers and TVs. These companies often promoted the DCDi by Faroudja logo, displaying it on products for differentiation and to identify advanced video processing.

Beginning in 2005, a strategic alliance was established with Meridian Audio to manufacture and distribute the Faroudja video processor systems. Today, Meridian markets various video processors exclusively under the Meridian name.

In 2007, Genesis Microchip, and its Faroudja technology, was acquired by STMicroelectronics, a global semiconductor company with revenues over $9.8 billion in 2008.

== Current technology and branding ==
Faroudja Video Optimized is a calibration and logo branding program available to TV and Set-Top Box manufacturers who use STMicroelectronics system-on-chip (SoC) solutions with integrated Faroudja video processing algorithms. The program helps properly initialize the video signal processing and optimize the LCD panel to produce an accurate picture. The program includes programming and calibration tools. Calibration steps include adjusting contrast, brightness, gamma levels, color temperature, sharpness, noise reduction filters and backlight levels, as well as Faroudja Adaptive Contrast Control (ACC2) and Active Color Management (ACM3D), to insure extended dynamic range and accuracy in shadow details, as well as natural tone (color quality). The calibrated settings are stored in a video mode called “Faroudja Movie”, optimized for high-end TVs and Blu-ray HD sources.

DCDi by Faroudja (directional correlational de-interlacing) technology is an advanced deinterlacing algorithm for upconverting and deinterlacing standard definition NTSC content for display on high-definition flat panel TVs. DCDi by Faroudja corrects several deinterlacing issues, including visible jagged edges in an image, cross-color artifacts and includes Film mode processing.

Faroudja DCDi Cinema was developed around higher performance 10-bit processing with extended picture enhancement controls, an active color management system and 3D Noise Reduction. In addition, Response Time Correction (RTC) technology is included to compensate for the motion blur prevalent in LCD flat panels.

Faroudja DCDi Edge was introduced for low-cost image improvement applications in a memory-less display; it utilizes spatial processing to eliminate the visible jagged edges.

=== Tools ===
Quickmatch Tool is a proprietary calibration program used to create the Faroudja Video Optimized settings. It connects to the Faroudja video SoC in the TV and interfaces with a colorimeter light sensor attached to the TV screen. Specific test patterns are generated which are detected by the colorimeter and processed by the QuickMatch program. The program can correct for variation in the panel to generate more accurate results.

Media Tools is a programming tool that provides direct access to the programming registers of the Faroudja video SoC, allowing for faster development and running of simulations.

== Awards for Yves Faroudja ==
- 1987 SMPTE David Sarnoff Gold Medal Award for “Contributing in Optimizing NTSC Performances”
- 1988 International Monitor Awards for “Excellence in Engineering - NTSC Encoders and Decoders”
- 1989 BM/E Award for “Excellence in Engineering”
- 1991 Emmy Award in Technology and Engineering for “Techniques for Minimization of NTSC Artifacts Through Advanced Encoding Techniques”
- 1998 Charles F. Jenkins Emmy Award in Technology and Engineering for Lifetime Achievements
- 2001 Emmy Award in Technology and Engineering for “Pioneering development of a digital up converter from 525 to HDTV for DTV broadcasting”

== See also ==
- Interlacing
- Deinterlacing
- Image processing
