= Pong: The Next Level =

1999 video game

- North American PlayStation box art
- Developers: Supersonic Software; Morning Star Multimedia (GBC)
- Publishers: Hasbro Interactive; MacSoft (Mac OS)
- Producers: Dan Kitchen; Kevin Mitchell (GBC)
- Programmer: Nick Eastridge (GBC)
- Artist: Bill Jannott (GBC)
- Composer: Scott Marshall (GBC)
- Series: Pong
- Platforms: Microsoft Windows, Mac OS, PlayStation, Game Boy Color
- Release: PlayStation, Windows: EU: October 22, 1999; NA: October 28, 1999; Game Boy Color: NA: December 1999; EU: 2000; Mac OS: NA: June 12, 2001
- Genre: Sports (table tennis)
- Modes: Single-player, multiplayer

Pong: The Next Level (known simply as Pong) is a 1999 table tennis video game serving as a remake of the 1972 Atari game Pong. It was developed by Supersonic Software and published by Hasbro Interactive for the PlayStation and Microsoft Windows, and was later ported to Game Boy Color and Mac OS.

== Gameplay ==
Pong: The Next Level consists of many levels that are either traditional Pong matches against a computer-controlled opponent in special three-dimensional arenas with special power-ups and environmental gimmicks that affect the way the game is played, or solo challenges that require the player to keep the ball in play and call for precise and skilled moves to win. An example of the former is "Rock and Roll", where the player must win a Pong match against an opponent on an arena that can tilt or deform, and an example of the latter is "Seal Juggle", where the player must "juggle" a ball on a slanted iceberg and use a special power-up to launch it high up the slope so that a seal can pick it up. Matches use the "deuce" rule, in which if both contestants are one point away from winning, the player who takes a two-point lead is declared the winner.

Each level has three variations of increasing difficulty: an initial easy variation that awards the player three golden bars, a slightly more difficult one that awards two gold bars and a challenging one that grants one golden bar. Golden bars are used to unlock other levels and advance to new zones, and players are encouraged to go back and play harder versions of earlier levels if they are unable to get past a newly discovered level. Collecting golden bars will also cause an in-game crystal Atari logo to slowly change to gold. Filling in one of each of the three bars in the logo by completing one particular variation of every level will grant players access to an emulation of the original Pong game, and two other variants.

All "match" levels support multiplayer, with a special mode for more than two players, named "Last Pong Standing". In this mode, each player will be randomly assigned to guard a certain part of the arena edge from balls in each round and attempt to "eliminate" opponents by scoring goals against them. Eliminated players will have their goal areas blocked off. Once one player remains, the round ends and scoring is awarded as follows: the first eliminated player earns no points, subsequently eliminated players are awarded a limited number of points and the last player standing receives full scoring. Subsequent rounds are played until one player reaches the target score.

== Reception ==
Reception

Aggregate score
Aggregator	Score			
Aggregator	GBC	Macintosh	PC	PS
GameRankings	66%	N/A	58%	68%

Review scores
Publication	Score			
Publication	GBC	Macintosh	PC	PS
AllGame	1.5/5	N/A	3.5/5	4.5/5
CNET Gamecenter	N/A	N/A	6/10	7/10
Computer Games Strategy Plus	N/A	N/A	3.5/5	N/A
Electronic Gaming Monthly	N/A	N/A	N/A	6.5/10
EP Daily	N/A	N/A	4/10	4.5/10
GameFan	N/A	N/A	N/A	73%
GameSpot	N/A	N/A	N/A	4.5/10
IGN	2/10	N/A	7.4/10	9/10
MacLife	N/A	"Spiffy"	N/A	N/A
Next Generation	N/A	N/A	N/A	4/5
Nintendo Power	6.6/10	N/A	N/A	N/A
Official U.S. PlayStation Magazine	N/A	N/A	N/A	3.5/5
PC Gamer (UK)	N/A	N/A	45%	N/A
PC Zone	N/A	N/A	28%	N/A

The PC and PlayStation versions received mixed or average reviews, while the Game Boy Color version received unfavorable reviews. Blake Fischer of NextGen, however, called the PlayStation version "Good dumb fun that will keep you hooked for hours at a time. Just don't tell anybody." GamePro said that the PC version "is fun--but not the kind of elaborate fun that will last you six months. It's more like a nifty stocking stuffer than a full-fledged present--one that will keep you warm and nostalgic into January." (Note: GamePro gave the PC version two 3/5 scores for graphics and control, 1.5/5 for sound, and 3.5/5 for fun factor.)
