= Atari Interactive =

American video game company

Atari Interactive, Inc.
- Formerly: Hasbro Electronic Entertainment (1995–1996); Hasbro Interactive, Inc. (1996–2001); Infogrames Interactive, Inc. (2001–2003)
- Type: Subsidiary
- Industry: Video games
- Founded: 1995; 31 years ago
- Headquarters: New York City, United States
- Key people: Tom Dusenberry (CEO, 1998-2001); Frédéric Chesnais (CEO, 2004-2007)
- Parent: Hasbro (1995–2001); Atari SA (2001–present)

Atari Interactive, Inc. (formerly Infogrames Interactive, Inc. and Hasbro Interactive, Inc.) is an American video game licensing company, and a subsidiary of the Atari SA holding company. It is the owner of the Atari brand, which it licenses out to its parent company and its North American publishing division Atari, Inc.

The company was formed as Hasbro Interactive in 1995 by toy and board game maker Hasbro as a way to expand to the video game market. The video game publisher was headquartered in Beverly, Massachusetts and released games based on existing Hasbro-owned IP, such as Monopoly and Mr. Potato Head before branching off into publishing third-party properties such as Frogger. Following the buyouts of Atari Corporation's assets including the Atari brand, MicroProse, Avalon Hill and Europress throughout 1998-1999, Hasbro Interactive became one of the largest video game publishers. It also began using the Atari brand to publish certain games.

Due to financial struggles and losses associated with the Dot-com bubble, Hasbro sold the entirety of Hasbro Interactive, excluding Avalon Hill, to French holding company Infogrames Entertainment SA in December 2000. Following the closure of the sale, the company was renamed as Infogrames Interactive and its purpose was reduced to managing franchise properties formerly published by Hasbro, with publishing in North America by Infogrames, Inc. It became Atari Interactive in May 2003 as part of a rebranding of Infogrames and its subsidiaries with the Atari brand.

== History ==
=== As Hasbro Interactive ===
Logo as Hasbro Interactive, used from 1996 until 2001

==== Early history and growth ====
Hasbro Interactive was formed late in 1995 to allow Hasbro to enter the video game market. Several Hasbro properties, such as Monopoly and Scrabble, had already been made into successful video games by licensees such as Virgin Interactive. With Hasbro's game experience, video games seemed like a natural extension of the company and a good opportunity for revenue growth. Hasbro Interactive's objective was to develop and publish games based on Hasbro properties.

In January 1997, the company announced it would publish games for the PlayStation. In 1997, revenues increased 145% going from US$35 million to $86 million. Hasbro Interactive was growing so fast that there was talk of reaching $1 billion in revenues by 2002. They began to engage in some other video game licensing, such as licensing Frogger from Konami. They sought to use Hasbro board game brands and Wizards of the Coast properties as leverage to increase revenues.

Hasbro Interactive embarked on both internal and external development, and acquired some smaller video game developers and publishers along the way. On February 23, 1998, JTS sold the Atari brand name and intellectual properties of Atari Corporation to Hasbro's HIAC XI, Corp., a wholly owned subsidiary created in Delaware for the purpose of the purchase. Hasbro Interactive then renamed HIAC XI, Corp. as Atari Interactive, Inc. in May 1998 and would use the Atari brand name to publish retro-themed remake titles. On the 21st of that month, Hasbro announced that a remake of Centipede would be released for the PC and PlayStation. Throughout 1999 and 2000, games like The Next Tetris, Missile Command, Pong: The Next Level, Q*Bert, Glover, Nerf Arena Blast and Breakout would be released under the Atari branding.

On August 4, 1998, the company acquired the rights for 300 games when it purchased Avalon Hill for $6 million, and followed this up on August 14 by purchasing MicroProse for $70 million. With those acquisitions Hasbro Interactive revenues increased 127% in 1998 to $196 million and profits of $23 million. In July 1999, the company purchased UK-based educational software publisher Europress.

In 1998, Hasbro signed an agreement with Majesco, whereas Majesco would publish/distribute games under a licensing agreement for various Nintendo consoles, notably the Game Boy Color. Majesco and Hasbro also worked on the Sega Dreamcast adaptation of Q*bert. It also converted Atari games for Hasbro. In April 1999, the company secured a licensing deal with Namco to develop and publish titles based on over 11 Namco franchises.

==== Losses and sale to Infogrames ====
Hasbro Interactive became the third-largest video game publisher within three years of its founding. But in 1999, Hasbro Interactive lost $74 million on revenues of $237 million a growth of just 20% over the previous year. Late in 1999 with several game projects underway and dozens of new employees, many of whom moved just to work for the company, Hasbro Interactive shut down several studios in a cost-cutting move. The studios affected included the former MicroProse offices located in Alameda, California, and Chapel Hill, North Carolina. A game development company, Vicious Cycle Software, was started by employees laid off in the North Carolina Hasbro Interactive studio closing. In 4 years, Hasbro Interactive's revenue increased 577%.

By the middle of 2000, the dot-com bubble had burst, Hasbro share price had lost 70% of its value in just over a year and Hasbro would post a net loss for the first time in two decades.

In April 2000, Hasbro Interactive sued GT Interactive and other publishers (eGames, Xtreme Games, MVP Software, Webfoot Technologies, and Varcon Systems) for copyright infringement of Atari's Tetris and Pac-Man. Hasbro settled the suit with GT Interactive and Varcon Systems in May, but with the rest.

Faced with these difficulties, on December 6, 2000, Hasbro announced they would completely sell off their Hasbro Interactive division to French software company Infogrames Entertainment SA. The sale included nearly all of its video game related rights and properties, the Atari brand and Hasbro's Games.com division, developer MicroProse and all of its software titles up to that point except for the Avalon Hill property. Hasbro Interactive's sale price was $100 million, $95 million as 4.5 million common shares of Infogrames and $5 million in cash. Under the terms of the sale agreement, Infogrames gained the rights to develop games based on Hasbro properties for a period of 15 years plus an option for an additional 5 years based on performance. The deal was completed on January 29, 2001.

=== Infogrames Interactive/Atari Interactive ===
Following the purchase, Infogrames renamed Hasbro Interactive, Inc. as Infogrames Interactive, Inc., and rebranded many of its subsidiaries under the Infogrames brand. The company ceased work as a full publisher, with these responsibilities transferring over to sibling company Infogrames, Inc. in North America, which had a similar pattern of renamings from GT Interactive. The company at this point only existed as a license and copyright holder for any properties formerly published under Hasbro Interactive, alongside new titles published under the Hasbro licensing deal, as well as continuing to own the Atari name and brands through the Atari Interactive subsidiary. In October 2001, Infogrames Interactive, Inc. licensed out the Atari brand to Infogrames' North American and European operations, which would allow it to publish new games under the brand.

In May 2003, following the success of this initial run of Atari-branded products, Infogrames Entertainment SA announced that it would rebrand all its subsidiaries under the Atari banner. To prepare for this change, the existing Atari Interactive, Inc. subsidiary was merged with Infogrames Interactive, Inc. and gained the Atari Interactive, Inc. name, being a wholly owned subsidiary of Infogrames Entertainment, SA (IESA). while the Infogrames, Inc. subsidiary licensed the Atari name and logo from Atari Interactive and changed its name to Atari, Inc. using it to develop, publish and distribute games for all major video game consoles and personal computers under the Atari brand. Infogrames would still maintain ownership of the original Atari properties received through Hasbro, which are kept in its Hasbro Interactive originated placeholder, Atari Interactive, Inc.

In April 2005, Atari's studio operations in Beverly, Massachusetts that managed former Hasbro properties were closed, together with those in Santa Monica, California, and publishing was consolidated in New York. Following major money losses throughout Infogrames Entertainment SA, the company began to sell most of its operations to pay off its debt. On June 9, 2005, the company reevaluated its licensing agreement with Hasbro by selling back its fifteen-year video game licensing agreement for $65 million. Hasbro re-acquired the rights to produce video games based on the Transformers, My Little Pony, Tonka, Connect Four, Candy Land and Playskool IPs, alongside Wizards of the Coast IP Magic: The Gathering; while securing Atari a seven-year license for titles based on the Hasbro board game portfolio, consisting of Monopoly, Scrabble, Game of Life, Battleship, Clue, Yahtzee, Simon, Risk and Boggle. Atari's exclusive video game license for Dungeons & Dragons was extended for another ten years, allowing Atari to continue publishing titles based on the franchise.

With continued money problems, in July 2007, Atari announced it had sold back the remainder of its Hasbro agreement to it for $19 million. The following month, Hasbro announced it had entered into a new multi-year casual publishing deal with Electronic Arts. However, Atari retained its Dungeons & Dragons license and also announced to publish a video game based on Jenga under the franchise owners Pokonobe Associates.

In December 2009, Hasbro and Wizards of the Coast filed a lawsuit against Atari SA for a breach and violation of its exclusive video game contract for Dungeons & Dragons after the company sold its international distribution arms to Namco Bandai Games earlier in the year and supplying a distribution agreement with them, proclaiming that it violated its licensing agreement. Atari responded back by saying the allegations were "unfounded" and that Hasbro was attempting to unfairly obtain the license rights back. In August 2011, the lawsuit was settled out of court with Hasbro reclaiming the licensing rights back from Atari, while Atari could continue to publish new Dungeons & Dragons titles under a non-exclusive agreement.

On January 21, 2013, all of Atari SA's North American subsidiaries, including Atari Interactive, Inc., filed petitions for relief under Chapter 11, Title 11, United States Code in the United States Bankruptcy Court for the Southern District of New York in an attempt to separate itself from its profit-losing parent company. They emerged from bankruptcy one year later.

== Former subsidiaries ==
Name	Location	Acquired/established	Closed/divested	Fate	Ref.
Atari Interactive, Inc.	United States	1998	2003	Formed as HIAC XI, Corp. to acquire the assets of Atari; merged out into parent company	
Atari Interactive Hunt Valley Studio	Hunt Valley, Maryland, United States	1998	2003	Acquired in MicroProse purchase. Named MicroProse Hunt Valley Studio before 2001 and Infogrames Interactive Hunt Valley Studio from 2001 to 2002. Atari, Inc. took over management operations beginning in 2001. Closed by Atari	
Infogrames Chippenham	Chipping Sodbury, United Kingdom	1998	2002	Acquired in MicroProse purchase. Named MicroProse Chipping Sodbury Studio before 2001; closed by Infogrames	
Atari Interactive Asia Pacific Pty, Ltd.	Australia	1998	2004	Australian distribution and publishing subsidiary, acquired in MicroProse purchase; formerly MicroProse Asia Pacific Pty, Ltd., Hasbro Interactive Asia Pacific Pty, Ltd. and Infogrames Interactive Asia Pacific Pty, Ltd.	
Infogrames Interactive GmbH	Germany	TBC	TBC	German publishing subsidiary, formerly Hasbro Interactive GmbH	
Infogrames Interactive Limited	United Kingdom	1995	2012	UK distribution and publishing subsidiary, formerly Hasbro Interactive Limited	
Infogrames Interactive Direct Limited	United Kingdom	1998	2016	UK mailorder subsidiary, formerly Hasbro Interactive Direct Limited	
Infogrames Learning Limited	Adlington, Cheshire, United Kingdom	1999	2013	Acquired as Europress. Europress brand sold back to original founders in 2001	
Leisuresoft GmbH	Germany	TBC	2001	German distribution subsidiary, sold to JoWooD Productions following the Infogrames purchase due to the latter already owning a German distribution arm	
MicroProse Alameda Studio	Alameda, California, United States	1998	1999	Acquired in MicroProse purchase; Closed	
MicroProse Chapel Hill Studio	Chapel Hill, North Carolina, United States	1998	1999	Acquired in MicroProse purchase; Closed	

=== Games.com ===
Games.com was a website operated by Hasbro Interactive. It went live on December 5, 2000. The site offered 34 games including Monopoly, Scrabble, Battleship, Sorry!, Boggle, Upwords and Clue as well as classic Atari properties Tempest, Asteroids, Missile Command, Super Breakout, Millipede, Lunar Lander and Centipede.

== Published games ==
Hasbro Interactive published over 160 games on several interactive media. Hasbro Interactive published and distributed its own titles in the United States, Canada, United Kingdom, Germany and Australia. Outside these markets, distribution was handled by various third parties including Ubi Soft in France, Leader S.p.A. in Italy, CD Projekt in Poland and Brasoft in Brazil. Infogrames, Inc., renamed Atari, Inc., continued to publish its titles, while the rights remained with the subsidiary.

Included among them were:

- Action Man: Operation Extreme – PlayStation
- Axis & Allies – Windows
- B-17 Flying Fortress: The Mighty 8th – Windows
- Battleship (1996 video game) – Windows
- Beast Wars: Transformers – PlayStation, Windows, Macintosh
- Boggle (video game) – Windows
- CatDog: Quest for the Golden Hydrant – Windows
- Centipede (1998) – Windows
- Civilization II: Test of Time – Windows
- Clue – Windows
- Daytona USA 2001 – Dreamcast
- Falcon 4.0 – Windows
- Frogger (1997) – Windows, PlayStation
- Frogger 2: Swampy's Revenge – Windows, PlayStation, Dreamcast
- Galaga: Destination Earth – Windows, PlayStation, Game Boy Color
- Game of Life – Windows
- Glover – Nintendo 64, PlayStation
- Grand Prix 3 – Windows
- Gunship! – Windows
- H.E.D.Z. – Windows
- Majesty: The Fantasy Kingdom Sim – Windows
- MechWarrior 3 – Windows
- Jeopardy! – PlayStation, Windows
- Missile Command (1999) - PlayStation, Windows, Game Boy Color
- Monopoly (1995) – Windows
- Monopoly (1997) – PlayStation
- Monopoly Star Wars – Windows
- Monopoly (1999) – Nintendo 64
- Monopoly (1999) – Windows
- NASCAR Heat — Windows, PlayStation Game Boy Color
- NASCAR Racers – Windows, Game Boy Color
- Nerf Arena Blast – Windows
- Nerf Jr. Foam Blaster: Attack of the Kleptons! – Windows
- Nicktoons Racing – Windows, PlayStation, Game Boy Color
- Nickelodeon Party Blast – Windows, Xbox, GameCube
- Pac-Man: Adventures in Time – Windows
- Pong: The Next Level – Windows, PlayStation
- Q*bert (1999) – Windows, PlayStation, Dreamcast, Game Boy Color
- Risk – Windows
- Risk II – Windows
- RollerCoaster Tycoon – Windows
- Rubik's Games – Windows
- Scrabble – Windows (MacScrabble — Macintosh)
- Sorry! – Windows
- Spirit of Speed 1937 – Windows
- Star Trek: Birth of the Federation – Windows
- Trivial Pursuit Millennium – Windows
- Wheel of Fortune – PlayStation, Windows
- Worms Armageddon – Windows, Dreamcast, PlayStation
- X-COM: Enforcer – Windows
- Yahtzee – Windows
