= VM Labs =

American technology company

- Founded: 1995
- Founder: Richard Miller
- Defunct: 2002
- Headquarters: Los Altos, California
- Products: Semiconductors, platforms

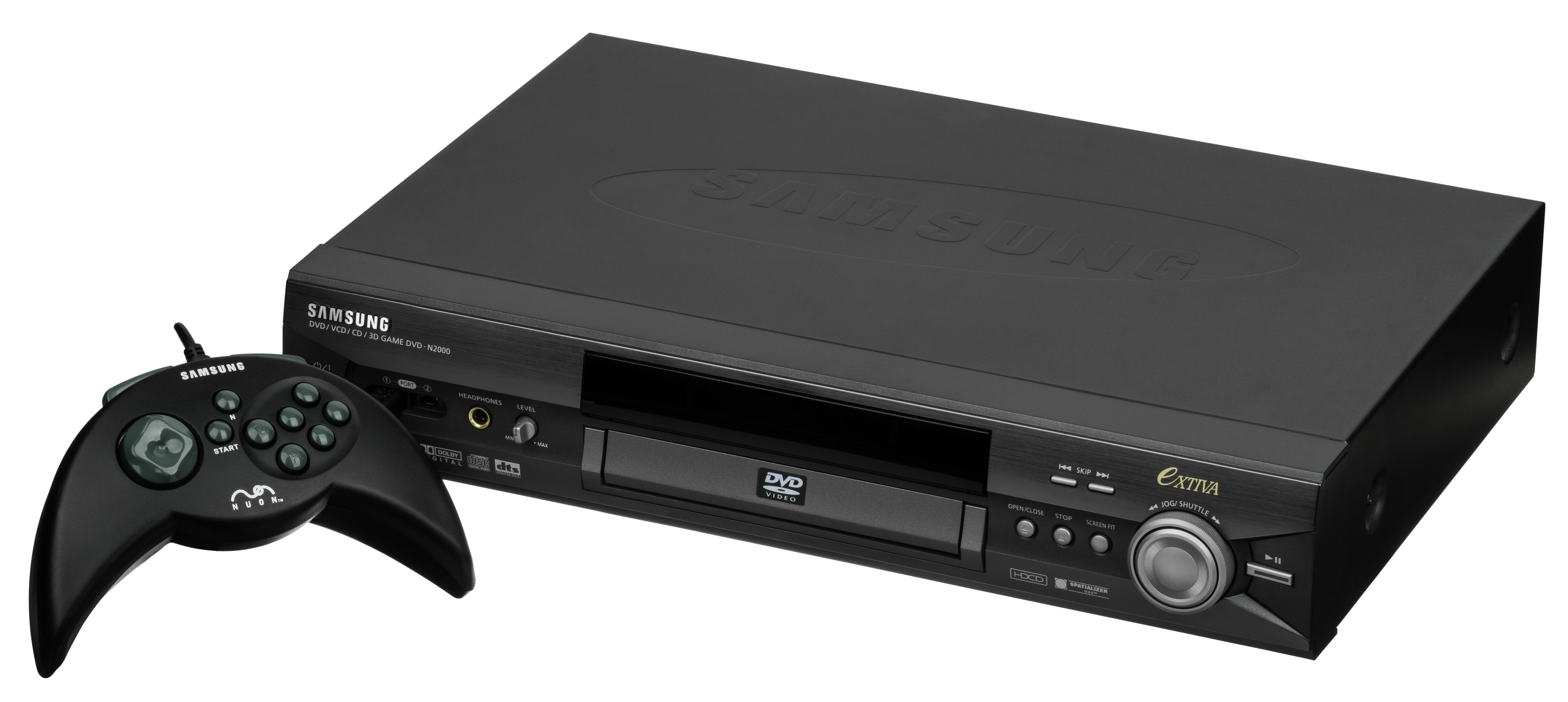
The Nuon-powered Samsung N2000 DVD player/gaming system

VM Labs was an American semiconductor and platform company, founded in 1995 by Richard Miller, a former vice president of Atari Corporation, in Los Altos, Silicon Valley, California. The company developed the NUON media processor technology, which was incorporated into DVD players manufactured by Toshiba, Samsung, and RCA, as well as a set-top box from Motorola. NUON enabled enhanced DVD features and 3D gaming capabilities on consumer DVD hardware. Following the collapse of critical funding after September 11, 2001, VM Labs entered Chapter 11 bankruptcy and was subsequently acquired by Genesis Microchip in February 2002.

== Products ==
The company's technology and NUON brand was used in DVD players from Toshiba, Samsung and RCA, as well as the Streamaster IP set-top box from Motorola.

The Nuon platform was featured in the specialized media for the 3D video game titles it would bring to DVD players and set-top boxes, as well as for the features that were not available on other DVD players when playing standard DVD-formatted titles. Notable embedded features included Jeff Minter's Virtual Light Machine (VLM) for music, real-time zoom, gamma-correction and smooth reverse shuttle.

Although Nuon DVD technology was initially supported by various Hollywood studios with plans to release several enhanced DVD titles, only four were ultimately released, including Bedazzled and Planet of the Apes.

== History ==
VM Labs was founded in 1995 in Los Altos, California, with seed financing and a non-exclusive license agreement with Motorola for media processor design. The first Nuon Media Processor design was delivered to Motorola for layout in 1996, and prototype silicon was received the following year. A second silicon design, the quad-core "Oz", was delivered to customers in 1997. By 1999, production shipments of the quad-core "Aries-1" silicon, along with the operating system and firmware, were underway to Motorola, Samsung, RCA, and others. The "Aries-2" chip entered production in 2000, followed in 2001 by "Aries-3", the first silicon design completed entirely at VM Labs, which was faster, lower cost, lower power, and more highly integrated than the Motorola versions, and was fabricated at TSMC.

The founder of VM Labs, Richard Miller, was a former vice president of Atari Corporation, and several prominent VM Labs employees (including Jeff Minter and John Mathieson) were also associated with Atari Corporation. VM Labs was headquartered in Los Altos, California.

After critical funding collapsed shortly after September 11, 2001, VM Labs was sold to Genesis Microchip after a brief period in Chapter 11.

Genesis Microchip planned to integrate the Nuon and Faroudja technologies for the DVD market, and ultimately used the NUON technology in HDTV chipsets. As an expanded DVD format and video game platform, as of November 2004, there were no Nuon-enabled DVD players shipping and no new Nuon software titles.
