= Virtual Light Machine =

The Virtual Light Machine (VLM) is a light synthesizer developed by Jeff Minter in 1990. It was installed into a number of electronics, including the Atari Jaguar CD and Nuon DVD players.

The Virtual Light Machine is similar to what would later be seen in music visualizations included with Winamp and other Media players. When an audio CD is put into a VLM compatible device, the VLM loads, manifesting visualizations which appear on the screen that change with the music. The VLM is set apart from simple music visualizers by an interactive mode that allows users to manipulate graphics generation on the fly.

== VLM versions ==
Three versions of the VLM software were released. VLM-1 is the version installed and developed for the Atari Jaguar CD. Nuon players featured version VLM-2. VLM-3 was to be the basis of the video game Unity, which was in turn upgraded to form the basis of the Neon light synthesizer, utilized in the Xbox 360 and Minter's Space Giraffe.

A prototype dubbed VLM-0 was demonstrated at several concerts and raves but was not made widely available.

=== VLM in Nuon DVD players ===
Every Nuon player used the same version of VLM; however there were differences in the number of effects available between players.

The player released by Toshiba only featured 8 VLM effects, less than the Samsung DVDN-2000. The Samsung DVDN-2000 featured a higher resolution than the Toshiba player. The Samsung DVDN-501 has the most VLM effects (about 150) but these effects were presented in a lower resolution than the DVDN-2000. Interactive mode is only available on Nuon players with attached joysticks.

RCA also released 2 Nuon DVD players that also featured VLM but these RCA players are missing many of the Nuon features that the Toshiba and Samsung players contain.

== See also ==
- Psychedelia (light synthesizer)
- Trip-a-Tron
- Neon (light synthesizer)
- List of music software
