= Boggle (video game) =

1997 video game

- Developer(s): PCA, Inc. Third-i Productions
- Publisher(s): Hasbro Interactive
- Platform(s): Windows
- Release: NA: October 1997; EU: 1997
- Genre(s): Puzzle

Boggle is a word puzzle video game based on the word game of the same name. It was published in October 1997 by Hasbro Interactive, and developed by PCA, Inc. and Third-i Productions. The game was released for Windows 95.

== Gameplay ==
In standard Boggle, the player is given a 4x4 grid of lettered dice, and the player must then find as many possible words in the grid of letters. In the video game, there are five different modes to play; Classic, BreakAway, Battle, Space, and In Your Face. Classic mode is the same as regular Boggle. In BreakAway, the player is given a 4x4x4 cube of letters and must find word combinations to remove letters. The game is finished once all cubes are broken away, or until no valid words are left. In Battle, two players must compete with each other. In Space, cubes are constantly rising towards the screen, and the player must click on letters to make a word. In In Your Face, 16 columns of letters are stacked, and the player must make words by using the visible letters in the columns.

== Reception ==
Boggle

Review scores
Publication	Score
GameSpot	7.8
IGN	7.2

Boggle received generally positive reception. IGN reviews give the game a 7.2, and GameSpot reviews give the game a 7.8.
