= Genesis Microchip =

Genesis Microchip Inc.
- Type: Subsidiary
- Industry: Semiconductor, Electronics
- Founded: 1987
- Headquarters: Santa Clara, California, US; Neihu District, Taipei City, Taiwan; Markham, Ontario, Canada; Bangalore, India
- Key people: CEO: Elie Antoun, OOO: Michael Lin & Tommy Lin
- Products: Semiconductor components, integrated circuits
- Revenue: 236.98 million USD (2006)
- Number of employees: 563 (2006)
- Parent: ST Microelectronics (since Dec 11, 2007)
- Website: www.gnss.com

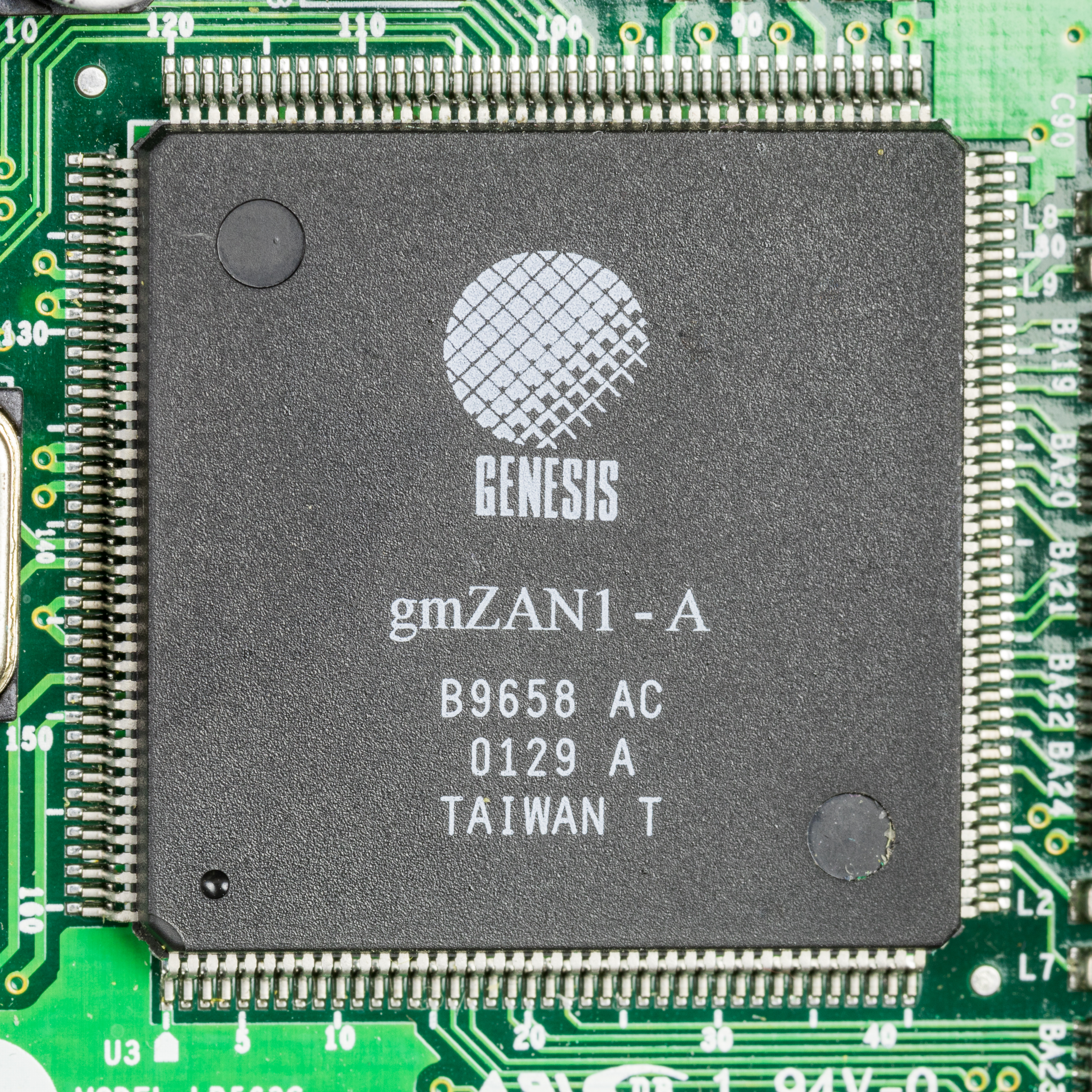
Display controller Genesis gmZAN1

Genesis Microchip Inc. was a supplier of integrated circuits (ICs) for video processors in flat panel LCD TVs and Monitors. It was founded in 1987 by Paul Russo in Markham, Ontario, Canada and it became a public company in 1998 and employed over 500 people (2006) worldwide. In 2002, Genesis acquired Sage Inc., a leading supplier of digital display technology. Two years earlier, Sage had acquired Faroudja which was known for its Emmy Award winning video processing technology. Key video processing technology includes: DCDi, MADi, image scaling (key industry patent), color management, LCD response time compensation, and founders of DisplayPort interconnect technology now a VESA standard.

On December 11, 2007, ST Microelectronics announced the acquisition of Genesis Microchip.
