= List of Atari Jaguar homebrew games =

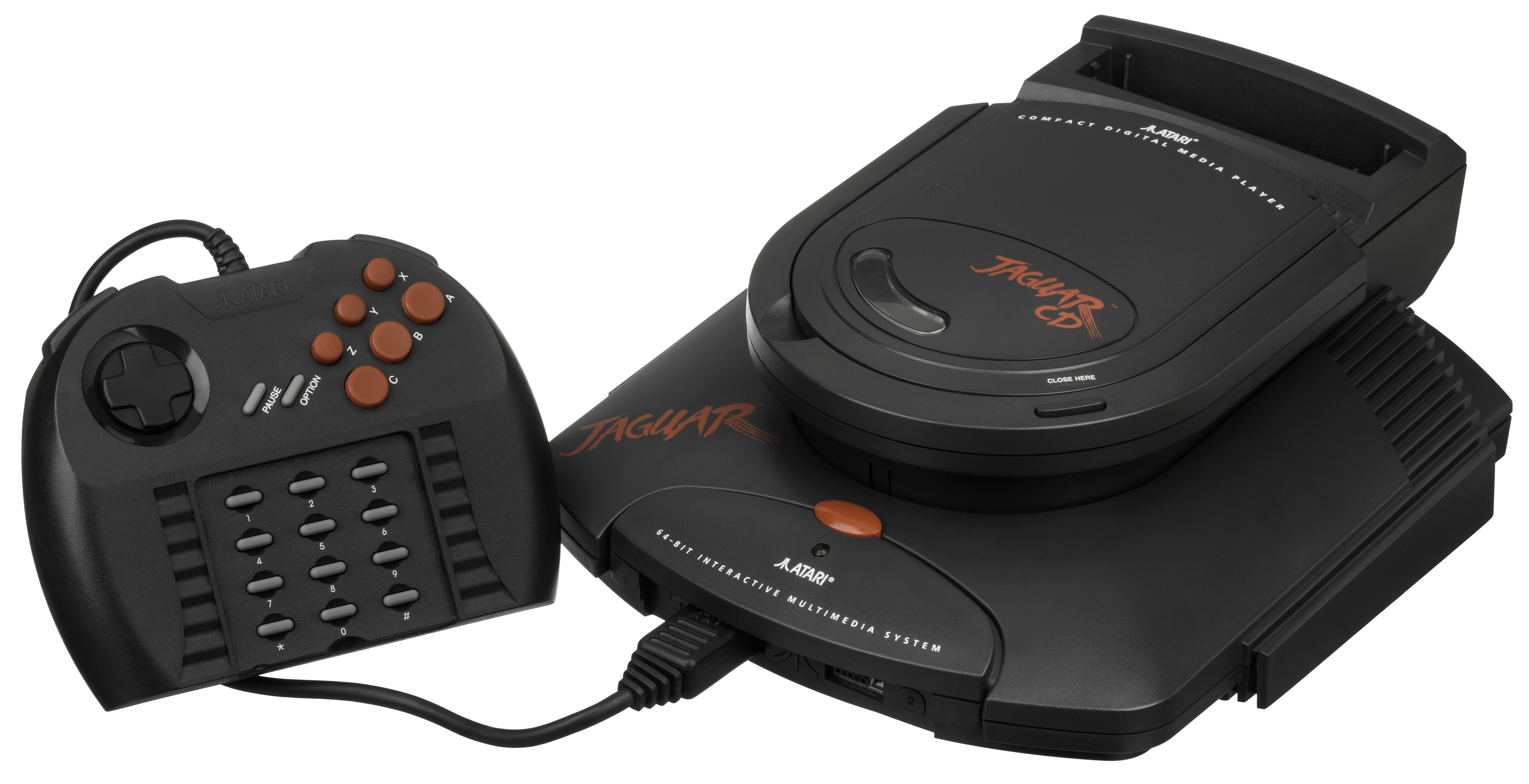
The Atari Jaguar console, with the Jaguar CD peripheral attached

The Atari Jaguar is a fifth generation home video game console developed by Atari Corporation and manufactured by IBM. First released in North America on November 23, 1993, the Jaguar was fifth home console under the Atari name. The following list includes aftermarket post-releases, as well as homebrew games made by the community for Jaguar and the Atari Jaguar CD peripheral.

In 1996, the Jaguar and game development for it were discontinued. Atari merged with JT Storage in 1996, while Hasbro Interactive acquired all of Atari's assets after buying out JTS in 1998. Hasbro declared the Jaguar as an open platform in 1999, releasing the console's patents and rights into public domain after much lobbying from Atari fans, allowing software developers to make and release games for Jaguar without a licensing agreement. Following the announcement, hobbyists have released previously finished but unpublished titles and produced homebrew games to satisfy the Jaguar's cult following. Consequently, these titles are not endorsed or licensed by Atari.

Homebrew games for Jaguar and Jaguar CD are distributed in either cartridge, CD-ROM, or both formats, complete with packaging mimicking officially licensed Jaguar releases. Most homebrew titles are released physically via independent publishers like AtariAge and Songbird Productions. Some of the earliest homebrew software for Jaguar were written using a hacked Jaguar console. Earlier CD releases were not encrypted, requiring either a bypass cartridge or a booting program in order to run unencrypted CDs. Between 2001 and 2003, the Classic Gaming Expo and Atari historian Curt Vendel released the binaries and encryption keys for both formats, allowing to run software without development hardware. All homebrew games are region free, as both systems do no enforce regional locking, but some titles do not work correctly on PAL consoles. There have been conversions from Atari ST to Jaguar, as the two platforms share similar hardware. While some of these Atari ST to Jaguar conversions by fans are free to download, others have been sold online. Other games and demos are also distributed online by their authors.

== Games ==
=== Post-releases ===
There are currently 118 (Note: This number is always up to date by this script.) aftermarket and/or unlicensed post-release Atari Jaguar and Atari Jaguar CD games on this list.

Title	Developer(s)	Publisher(s)	Release date	Ref.				
Title	Developer(s)	Publisher(s)	Release date	Ref.	3D ZYX	Wave 1 Games	Wave 1 Games	October 26, 2022
A Frogz 64 Christmas	Wave 1 Games	Wave 1 Games	December 13, 2017 (CD); December 7, 2018 (cartridge)					
Absorbierer	Luchs Soft	Luchs Soft	August 2015					
Alice's Mom's Rescue	OrionSoft	OrionSoft; Peleiades	March 27, 2015 (CD); November 7, 2015 (cartridge)					
American Hero	Inter-Active Productions	Nick Bamji	June 2003 (demo)					
Another World	The Removers	Retro-Gaming Connexion	December 2013					
Ants	atari2600land; Wave 1 Games	Wave 1 Games	November 15, 2018					
Arena Football '95	V-Real Interactive	B&C ComputerVisions; Jaguar Sector II	July 15, 2006					
Arne - Jäger des Jags	Luchs Soft	Luchs Soft	November 7, 2015					
Asteroite	PhoBoZ Games, Krauser Productions	Songbird Productions	March 2022					
AstroStorm	SporadicSoft	AtariAge	October 2017					
Atomic	The Removers	Jagware	April 22, 2006					
Ausweichmanöver	Luchs Soft	Luchs Soft	July 10, 2015					
Barkley Shut Up and Jam!	Ringler Studios	B&C ComputerVisions	July 2002					
BattleSphere	4Play	ScatoLOGIC	February 29, 2000					
BattleSphere Gold	4Play	ScatoLOGIC	March 15, 2002					
Beebris: Special Edition	Reboot	Reboot	January 17, 2010					
Black ICE\White Noise	Atari Corporation	Ambient Distortions; Kelp Entertainment	March 10, 2003					
Black Out!	Stormworks Interactive	Stormworks Interactive	July 9, 2012 (cartridge); August 13, 2012 (CD)					
Block'em Sock'em	Second Dimension	AtariAge	October 13, 2023					
Brawn and Brains	Cerebral Vortex Software Development, Reboot, SporadicSoft	AtariAge	October 2020					
Brett Hull NHL Hockey	Ringler Studios	B&C ComputerVisions; Jaguar Sector II	January 9, 2004 (cartridge); May 14, 2009 (CD)					
Caves of Fear	Atari Corporation	B&C ComputerVisions	August 10, 2002					
CGE 5th Anniversary Slideshow	Songbird Productions	Songbird Productions	August 10, 2002					
Custodian	Realms Software Concepts (Note: Atari ST-to-Atari Jaguar conversion by Lawrence Staveley.)	Piko Interactive	January 30, 2017					
Defender of the Crown	Cinemaware	AtariAge	November 19, 2018					
Double Feature #1	MD Games	MD Games	October 31, 2006					
Downfall	Reboot	Reboot	November 19, 2011					
Downfall+	Reboot	Reboot	March 2014					
Dr. Typo Collection	Thibault Bernard	AtariAge	May 2022					
Elansar	OrionSoft	OrionSoft	July 2013 (cartridge); August 2014 (CD)					
Escape 2042: The Truth Defenders	OrionSoft	AtariAge	October 2017					
Fantasy World Dizzy	Codemasters	AtariAge	July 2019					
Fast Food 64	Wave 1 Games	Wave 1 Games	2017					
Fast Food 64: Holiday Snacks	Wave 1 Games	Wave 1 Games	2018					
Flappy McFur	BitJag	BitJag	October 19, 2016					
Frog Feast	Rastersoft	Chaos89.com; Rastersoft	September 27, 2007 (CD); October 30, 2007 (cartridge)					
Frogz 64	Wave 1 Games	Wave 1 Games	2017					
Full Circle: Rocketeer	Reboot	RGCD	June 2013					
Gods	The Bitmap Brothers	AtariAge	October 14, 2022					
Gorf Classic	3D Stooges Software Studios	3D Stooges Software Studios	February 1, 2006					
Gravitic Mines	Reboot	AtariAge	May 2022					
Head over Heels	Ocean Software	Piko Interactive	April 15, 2019					
Hyper Force	Visual Impact	Songbird Productions	April 10, 2000					
Impulse X	MD Games	MD Games	November 24, 2012 (CD); 2013 (cartridge)					
Impossamole	Core Design	Piko Interactive	April 15, 2019					
Jag-Ads	Minuteman Productions	Songbird Productions	2003					
Jag-Ads 2.0	Minuteman Productions	Songbird Productions	2004					
Jaguar Hockey League 15	Frédéric Moreau	Gary Taylor	July 2015					
JaguarMIND: Bomb Squad	Starcat Developments	Starcat Developments	November 12, 2005					
Jagware Collection 1.0	Cerebral Vortex Software Development, OrionSoft, Reboot, The Removers	RGCD	April 2013					
JagZombies	Wave 1 Games	Wave 1 Games	2018					
JagZombies 2	Wave 1 Games	Wave 1 Games	2020					
Jeff Minter Classics	Llamasoft	AtariAge	October 2017					
Jumping at Shadows	Reboot	AtariAge	September 2024					
KA AirCars	MidNite Entertainment Group Inc.	Team Jaguar	September 27, 2010					
Kings of Edom	PhoBoZ Games	Songbird Productions	October 26, 2021					
Kobayashi Maru: Final	Reboot	RGDC	December 2012					
Last Strike	Reboot	AtariAge	October 2020					
Livewire: Archival Project	Black Scorpion Software	Reboot Games	2025					
Loopz	Audiogenic	Songbird Productions	October 25, 2018					
Lost Treasures	Starcat Developments	Starcat Developments	November 4, 2006					
Mad Bodies	FORCE Design	FORCE Design	May 2, 2009					
Mad Professor Mariarti	Krisalis Software	Piko Interactive	April 5, 2024					
Max Vampire: Crypt Raider	SporadicSoft	Reboot Games	2025					
Magic Pockets	The Bitmap Brothers	AtariAge	April 2026					
Monster Business	Eclipse Software Design	Songbird Productions	2027	—N/a				
Native	Duranik	Songbird Productions	April 10, 2002 (demo)					
Novagen Volume 1	Novagen Software	AtariAge	October 13, 2023					
Ocean Depths	Starcat Developments	Starcat Developments	April 9, 2004					
Old Towers	RetroSouls	Songbird Productions	April 2025					
Operation: Followthrough	Stormplay Games	Songbird Productions	2026					
Orion's Jaguar Collection	OrionSoft	OrionSoft	July 2013					
Painter	Sinister Developments	Sinister Developments	August 8, 2003					
Painter: Definitive Edition	Sinister Developments	Reboot Games; AtariAge	2024 (Reboot Games); April 2026 (AtariAge)					
Painter: Special Edition	Sinister Developments	omf	2008					
Phase Zero	Hyper Image Productions	B&C ComputerVisions; Songbird Productions	June 2002 (demo)					
Philia: the Sequel to Elansar	OrionSoft	OrionSoft	June 2014					
Protector	Bethesda Softworks	Songbird Productions	November 27, 1999					
Protector: Resurgence	Songbird Productions	Songbird Productions	September 12, 2014 (CD); June 2024 (cartridge)					
Protector: Special Edition	Songbird Productions	Songbird Productions	April 30, 2002					
reBOOTed	Reboot	AtariAge	October 2020					
Rebooteroids	Reboot	AtariAge	November 14, 2016					
Return to Blacktooth: A Head over Heels Adventure	Colin Porch	Thalamus Digital	August 2026					
Robinson's Requiem	Silmarils	Songbird Productions	May 30, 2011					
Rocket Ranger	Cinemaware	AtariAge	October 13, 2023					
Saucer Wars	Wave 1 Games	Wave 1 Games	2019					
Sea Battle	RareGame	RareGame	2017					
Shape Shooter 2000	sjc	Songbird Productions	October 2026					
SIMONE: A 64-Bit Memory Game	RISC Games	RISC Games	June 4, 2021					
Sinitrex 2000	PhoBoZ Games	PhoBoZ Games	August 2026					
Skyhammer	Rebellion Developments	Songbird Productions	May 2000					
Soccer Kid	Krisalis Software	Songbird Productions	February 7, 2000					
Space War 2000	Atari Corporation	B&C ComputerVisions	August 11, 2001					
Speedball 2: Brutal Deluxe	The Bitmap Brothers	AtariAge	July 2019					
SpideX	PhoBoZ Games	PhoBoZ Games; Songbird Productions	2020					
Star Streak	Alexander Grade, David Cummings	Songbird Productions	2027					
Star Streak: JagFest Edition	Alexander Grade, David Cummings	Songbird Productions	June 2024					
Stormbringer	David Jones	AtariAge	November 1, 2022					
SuperFly DX	Reboot	Reboot	April 29, 2010					
Switchblade	Core Design	Piko Interactive	September 7, 2017					
Switchblade II	Core Design	Piko Interactive	March 31, 2023					
The Chaos Engine	The Bitmap Brothers	AtariAge	October 14, 2022					
The Early Years CD Collection	Songbird Productions, MD Games, Starcat Devocean, Duranik	Songbird Productions	November 2019					
There Is Hope	Denis Karimani	Remute	March 2024					
Total Carnage	Hand Made Software	Songbird Productions	September 2005					
Towers II: Enhanced Stargazer Edition	JV Games	Songbird Productions	2023					
Treasure Island Dizzy	Codemasters	AtariAge	November 19, 2018					
Uwol: Quest for Money	Oceo	Peleiades	July 2019					
Varuna's Forces	Accent Media Productions	B&C ComputerVisions	2009 (demo)	—N/a				
Vroom	Lankhor	Songbird Productions	April 2026					
Wings of Death	Eclipse Software Design	Songbird Productions	October 28, 2025					
Wormhole 2000	PhoBoZ Games	PhoBoZ Games; Songbird Productions	2020					
Where Is It? The Quest for the 10th Island	Eric Mendel	Songbird Productions	April 2026					
Xenon 2: Megablast	The Bitmap Brothers	Peleiades	May 27, 2016					
Xenowings	Dune	AtariAge	September 2024					
Yo-Yo Shuriken	Dr. Ludos	AtariAge	October 2026					
Yopaz IceStar	OrionSoft	OrionSoft	August 2014					
Zool Collection	Gremlin Graphics (Zool); Imagitec Design (Zool 2)	Songbird Productions	2027					

=== Homebrew ===
There are currently 144 homebrew games and/or demos on this list.

Title	Genre(s)	Developer(s)	Year (Note: Attributed to multiple references:)	Ref.				
Title	Genre(s)	Developer(s)	Year	Ref.	2048	Puzzle	toarnold	2015
The Aesthetics Of Emptiness	Demo	Koszalinskie Retro Komputery i Konsole	2026					
Ants	Action	Chris Read	2017					
Aqua 64 Screen Saver	Demo	RISC Games	2017					
Arkanna	Adventure	Stormworks Interactive	2000					
Asphalt Vendetta	Vehicular combat	D-Mar The Daytripper	2026					
Atomic	Puzzle	Sébastien Briais	2006					
Atomic Reloaded	Puzzle	The Removers	2009					
Aurora 64 Screen Saver	Demo	RISC Games	2018					
Bad Apple!!	Demo	Reboot	2017					
BadCode0	Demo	BadCoder	1999					
BadCode1	Demo	BadCoder	1999					
BadCode2	Demo	BadCoder	2000					
BadCode3	Demo	BadCoder	2000					
BadCode4	Demo	BadCoder	2000					
BadCode4 (Metal)	Demo	BadCoder	2001					
BadCode4 (New Metal)	Demo	BadCoder	2001					
BadCode4C (Compressed)	Demo	BadCoder	2000					
Balloon	Light gun shooter	Matthias Domin	2003					
Beebris	Puzzle	Reboot	2009					
bexa64n	Action	Bello Games	2018					
Bexagon (Party Version)	Action	Bello Games	2018					
Black Hole	Shoot 'em up	Cerebral Vortex Software Development	2012					
Black Hole Reignited	Shoot 'em up	Frédéric Descharmes	2023					
Black Jag: Hyper Power League	Sports	FORCE Design	2005					
Block'em Sock'em	Puzzle	Second Dimension	2023					
Blue KNIGHT\White Horse	Platformer	Bello Games	2018					
Boingy Uppy	Platformer	Reboot	2015					
BurgerTom	Platform	Oceo	2026					
Canyon Rider	Racing	Mik Javalonde	2026					
Christmas Craze	Platform	Oceo	2026					
Classic Kong	Platform	Oceo	2026					
Cloudy with a Chance of Meatballs	Demo	Reboot	2015					
ColMouse	Demo	Matthias Domin	1996					
Colors	Demo	Matthias Domin	1996					
Connaone	Action	RasterSoft	2007					
Cosmic X2K	Action	RISC Games	2017					
Critter Circuit	Racing	Mark Bauermeister	2026					
Dance Dance Xirius Space Party	Music	Cerebral Vortex Software Development	2012					
Dazed vs	Puzzle	Frédéric Descharmes	2008					
Degz	Shoot 'em up	Reboot	2012					
DiamJag	Puzzle	Jagware	2006					
Do The Same	Puzzle	Cerebral Vortex Software Development	2009					
Doger	Action	Reboot	2015					
Downfall	Action	Reboot	2011					
Downtown Dash	Action	Dr. Ludos	2026					
DragonKeep	Action	Reboot	2020					
DruidFeST Vol.3 & Atak Klonów	Demo	DruidFeST	2026					
Duckie Egg	Platformer	Mark Ball	2012					
Eerievale	Adventure	Starcat Developments	2004					
Embrace The Plasma	Demo	Checkpoint	2014					
Expressway	Action	Reboot	2013					
Fallen Angels	Action	Thibault Bernard	2013					
Fish Feast Fury 64	Action	RISC Games	2017					
Frontier: Elite II	Simulation	swap d0	2006					
Full ACTion Sprites (FACTS)	Demo	SCPCD	2008					
Full Circle: Rocketeer (Promo)	Shooter	Reboot	2013					
GemRace	Racing	Thibault Bernard	2016					
Go Lucky	Party	Ralf Patschke	2024					
Golden Nine	—N/a	Bard Arwer, Mik Javalonde	2026					
Gryzzles	Puzzle	toarnold	2015					
Gun Dudes in the Psycho Boneyard	Shooter	John Rockefeller	2026					
H.E.R.O.	Action	VladR	2013					
Half Circle: 8biteer	Shooter	Reboot	2013					
HalMock FurBall: Sink or Swim	Action	Starcat Devocean	2017					
HMS Raptor	Shoot 'em up	Reboot	2012					
j_	Demo	Checkpoint	2013					
Jag Strikers 64	Beat 'em up	D-Mar The Daytripper	2026					
JagBoom	Action	D-Mar The Daytripper	2026					
JagCube	Demo	Holger Hannig	2004					
JagLion	Demo	Mike Brent	2008					
JagMania	Maze	Matthias Domin	1996					
JagMarble	Platformer	Matthias Domin	1998					
Jagmatch	Puzzle	Sebastian Mihai	2015					
JagPattern	Demo	Holger Hannig	2004					
JagRotate	Demo	Mike Brent	2007					
Jaguar Hockey Legends 13	Sports	Frédéric Moreau, George Nakos	2013					
Jaguar Hockey Legends 15	Sports	Frédéric Moreau, George Nakos	2015					
Jaguar MOD Jukebox	Music	RISC Games	2017					
JaguarMIND: Bomb Squad	Puzzle	Starcat Developments	2006					
JagWorm	Action	Starcat Developments	2004					
Jetpac	Shooter	D-Bug	2009					
JSTetris	Puzzle	Bastian Schick	1996					
Jumping at Shadows: Moth-Line	Platformer	Reboot	2024					
Jungle Jag	Platformer	Orion	2007					
Jurl	Action	Tonsomo Entertainment	2025					
Kaboom!	Action	OMF	2015					
Kobayashi Maru	Shooter	Reboot	2011					
Koszalin Retro Games Show 2025 Invitation	Demo	Koszalinskie Retro Komputery i Konsole	2024					
Legion Force Jidai: The Next Era!	Run and gun	FORCE Design	2003					
Let's Do The Twist Again	Demo	Rennais Eric Dezert	2022					
Lost Treasures	Compilation	Starcat Developments	2006					
Lugaru: The Rabbit's Foot	Hack and slash	D-Mar The Daytripper	2026					
Madrasa: Imperfect Discourse - Demo	Visual novel	nistur	2026					
Mars Rover	Demo	Mark Ball	2012					
Martian Attack	Shoot 'em up	Mike Brent	2007					
Midsummer Dreams	Cards	Clint Thompson	2017					
Morphonic Lab XIII: Contarum	Demo	Checkpoint	2014					
Mr.Off	Puzzle	Jean-Christophe Méric	2026					
Native	Shoot 'em up	Duranik	1997					
Native Spirit	Shoot 'em up	Zetanyx	2007					
Ocean Depths	Compilation	Starcat Developments	2004					
Operation: Followthrough Prologue	Light gun shooter	Stormplay Games	2024					
Orion's Jaguar Collection	Compilation	Orion	2009					
Osmozys	Puzzle	Orion	2008					
Painter	Action	Sinister Developments	1996					
Paprium	Beat 'em up	Mark Bauermeister	2026					
Particle-Man	Maze	Tolbat Games	2026					
Portland Retro Gaming Expo 2014 Welcome Demo	Demo	Bitjag	2014					
Project Manor Raid	First-person shooter	Mark Bauermeister	2026					
Project One	Shoot 'em up	Reboot	2009					
PropStorm Demo	Shoot 'em up	Tolbat Games	2026					
Race Drivin'	Racing	ArcadePath	2026					
Reactris	Puzzle	U-235	2011					
Retro-Gaming Connexion 2006 Little Intro	Demo	Orion	2006					
Ring Mod	Action	Yasaswi Paruchuri	2026					
Rocks Off!	Puzzle	Reboot	2013					
Ruinweft	Dungeon crawl	David Cummings	2026					
Santa's Cookies 2025	Action	Wave 1 Games	2025					
Silly Venture 2k25 Winter Edition Invitation	Demo	Resistance	2025					
Shape Shooter 2000	Action	sjc	2024					
Shit's Frozen 64	Demo	Reboot	2013					
Shoot'em Up	Shoot 'em up	Thibault Bernard	2012					
SkyFire68K	Shoot 'em up	sjc	2025					
SpaceZot	Shoot 'em up	Eric Mendel	2025					
Stickman	Action	Chris Read	2017					
SuperFly DX	Arcade	Reboot	2010					
Surrounded!	Shooter	3D Stooges Software Studios	2006					
Swinia Compofiller 2: A Way To Improve...	Demo	Tom Rain	2026					
T:ME Salvo	Shooter	swap d0	2026					
Tenebra	Puzzle	Ali Pouladi	2024					
Tenebra 2	Puzzle	Ali Pouladi	2024					
Thank You Demo	Demo	swap d0	2026					
The Abbey of Crime Extensum	Adventure	AmigaWave	2026					
The Assassin	Action	OMC Games	1999					
The Car Demo	Demo	Clint Thompson	2018					
The Caribbean Tavern	Party	Frédéric Descharmes	2023					
The Maxx	Action	Chris Vick	2008					
Tiko Bash	Action	D-Mar The Daytripper	2026					
Tube	Racing	Thibault Bernard	2012					
Tube Second Edition	Racing	Thibault Bernard	2012					
Where Is It? The Quest for the 10th Island	Puzzle	Eric Mendel	2024					
Witch	Shoot 'em up	KanedaFr	2024					
Xenowings	Shoot 'em up	Dune	2026					
μFLY	Arcade	Reboot	2015					

== See also ==
- List of Atari Jaguar games
- List of cancelled Atari Jaguar games
- Lists of video games
