= List of Atari Jaguar games =

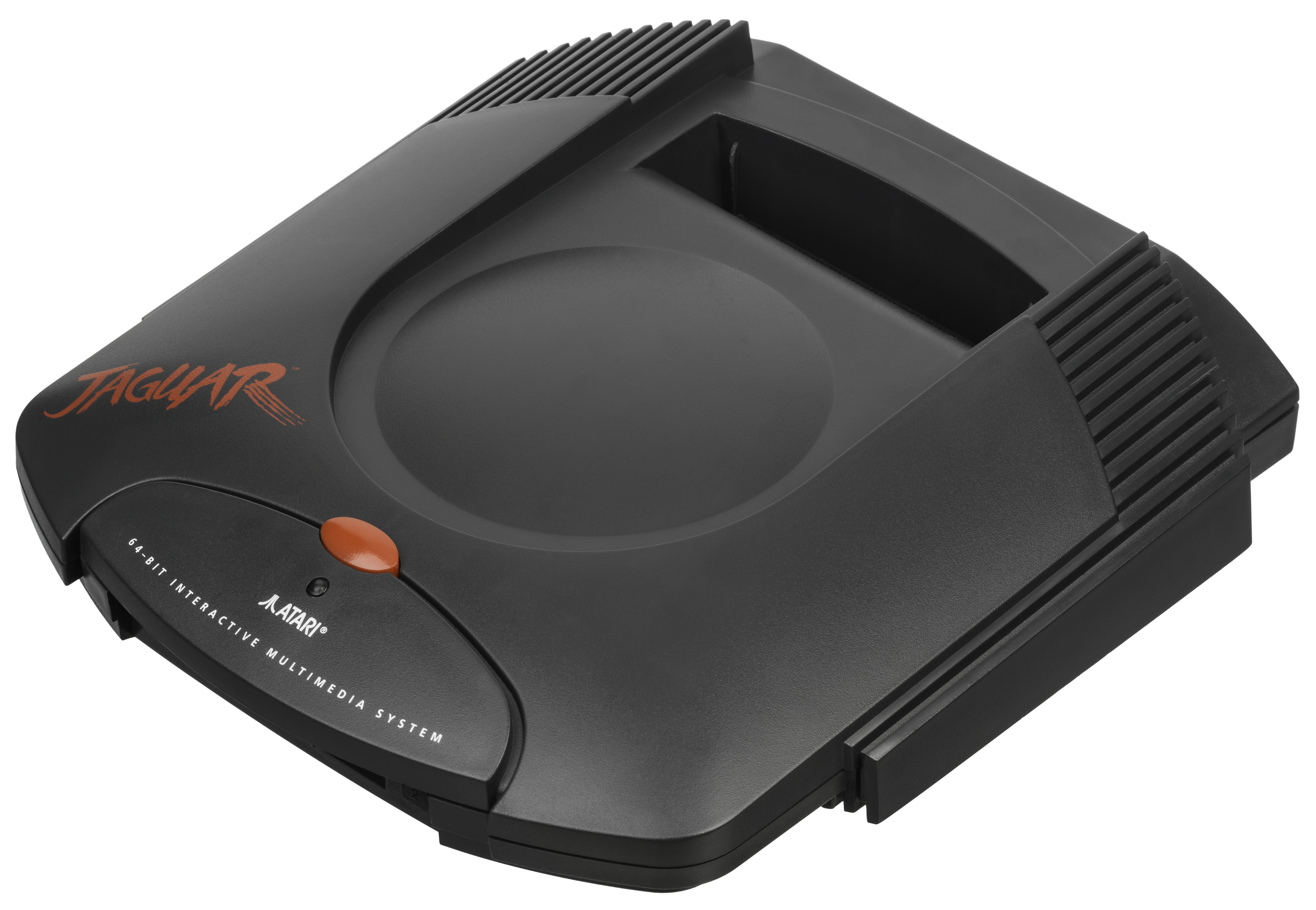
Jaguar console

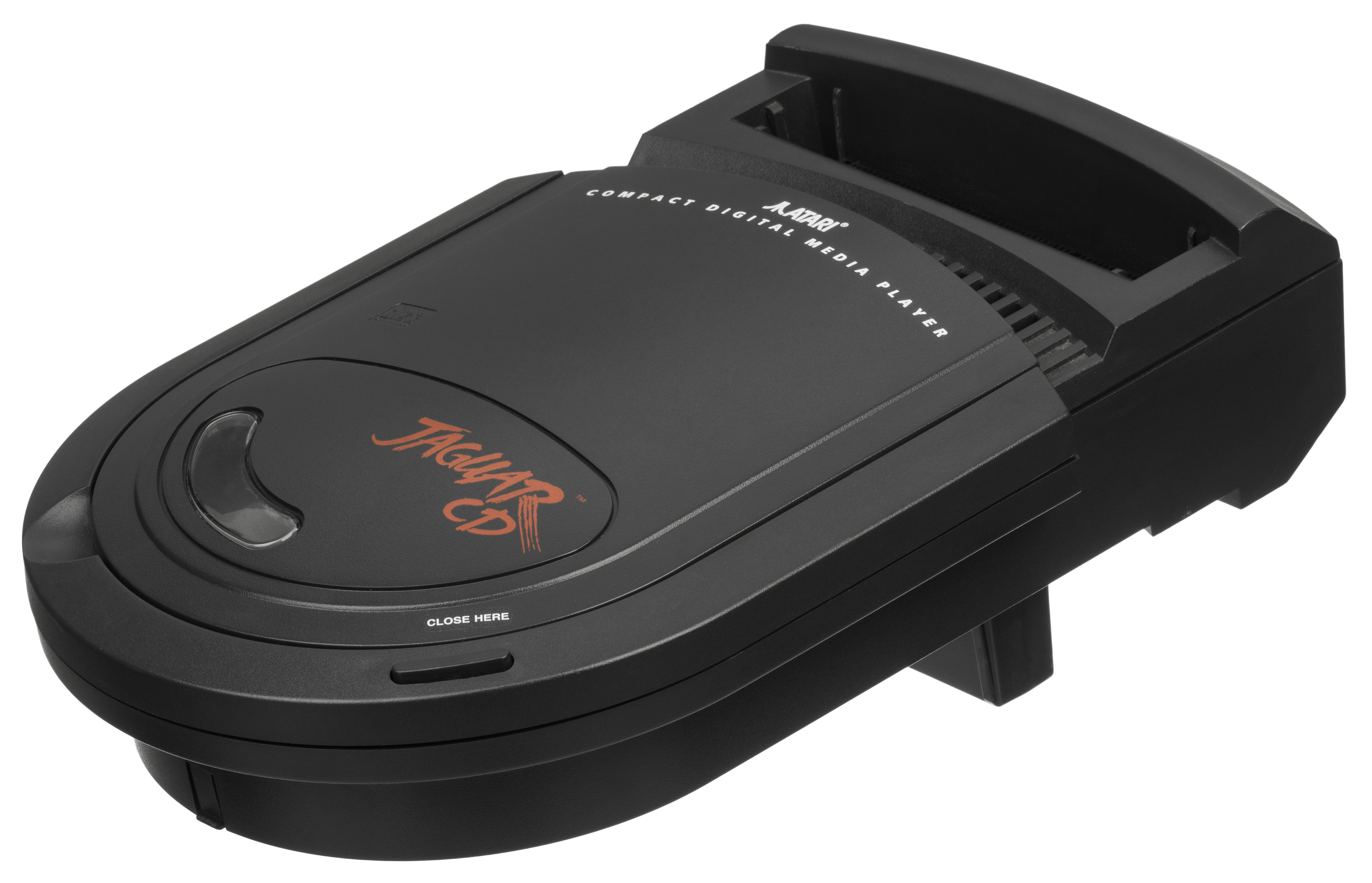
CD drive

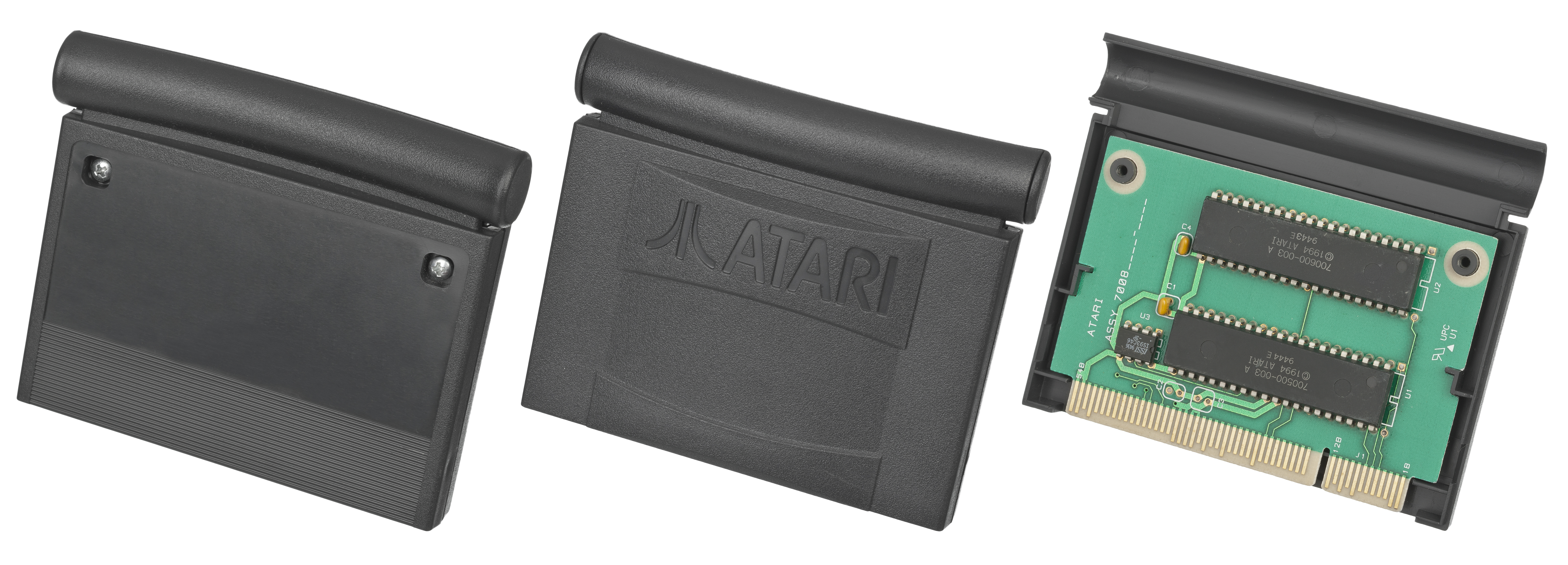
This Jaguar cartridge disassembly shows the front, back, and the ROM chip to store a game.

The list of Atari Jaguar games has the complete library of 50 cartridges and 13 CD-ROMs from the console's original 1990s retail release period. The list of canceled games is of those announced or in development but never released.

First released in North America on November 23, 1993, the Jaguar is a fifth generation home video game console developed by Atari Corporation and manufactured by IBM. By 1996, the Jaguar and game development for it were discontinued. The best-selling game is Alien vs Predator, with 52,223 copies as of April 1, 1995. Hasbro declared the Jaguar as an open platform in 1999, releasing the console's patents and rights into public domain, allowing software developers to make and release games for Jaguar without requiring a licensing agreement. Since then, hobbyists have released previously finished but unpublished games and produced homebrew games to the Jaguar's cult following.

== Games ==
=== Cartridge ===
The official library includes 50 (Note: This number is always up to date by this script.) cartridge games.

Titles	Developers	Publishers	Release dates			Ref.
Titles	Developers	Publishers	NA	EU	JP	Ref.
AirCars	MidNite Entertainment Group Inc.	ICD	June 18, 1997	Unreleased	Unreleased	
Alien vs Predator	Rebellion Developments	Atari Corporation; Mumin Corporation ^{(JP)}	October 21, 1994	October 20, 1994	December 8, 1994	
Atari Karts	Miracle Designs	Atari Corporation	December 22, 1995	January 1996	Unreleased	
Attack of the Mutant Penguins	Sunrise Games	Atari Corporation	March 15, 1996	December 1995	Unreleased	
Breakout 2000	MP Games	Telegames	December 10, 1996	December 10, 1996	Unreleased	
Brutal Sports Football	Teque London	Telegames	August 22, 1994	September 1994	1995	
Bubsy in Fractured Furry Tales	Imagitec Design	Atari Corporation	December 1994	January 1995	1995	
Cannon Fodder	The Dome Software Developments	Computer West ^{(NA)} Virgin Interactive Entertainment ^{(EU/AU)} Mumin Corporation ^{(JP)}	February 24, 1995	February 1995	May 26, 1995	
Checkered Flag	Rebellion Developments	Atari Corporation	November 1994	December 1994	1995	
Club Drive	Atari Corporation	Atari Corporation; Mumin Corporation ^{(JP)}	November 1994	December 1994	March 24, 1995	
Cybermorph	Attention to Detail	Atari Corporation; Mumin Corporation ^{(JP)}	November 23, 1993	June 1994	December 15, 1994	
Defender 2000	Llamasoft	Atari Corporation	February 14, 1996	February 1996	Unreleased	
Doom	id Software	Atari Corporation; Mumin Corporation ^{(JP)}	December 2, 1994	December 1994	February 17, 1995	
Double Dragon V: The Shadow Falls	Telegames	Williams Entertainment	April 5, 1995	April 1995	1995	
Dragon: The Bruce Lee Story	Virgin Interactive Entertainment	Atari Corporation	November 1994	December 1994	1995	
Evolution: Dino Dudes	Imagitec Design	Atari Corporation; Mumin Corporation ^{(JP)}	March 1994	June 1994	January 13, 1995	
Fever Pitch Soccer	Distinctive Developments	Atari Corporation	December 15, 1995	December 1995	Unreleased	
Fight for Life	Atari Corporation	Atari Corporation	April 19, 1996	April 19, 1996	Unreleased	
Flashback: The Quest for Identity	Tiertex Design Studios	U.S. Gold	August 9, 1995	August 1995	Unreleased	
FlipOut!	Gorilla Systems Corporation	Atari Corporation	August 28, 1995	July 1995	Unreleased	
Hover Strike	Atari Corporation	Atari Corporation	April 21, 1995	May 1995	1995	
I-War	Imagitec Design	Atari Corporation	December 15, 1995	December 1995	Unreleased	
International Sensible Soccer	Williams Brothers Developments	Telegames	April 1995	February 1995	1995	
Iron Soldier	Eclipse Software Design	Atari Corporation; Mumin Corporation ^{(JP)}	December 22, 1994	January 1995	March 24, 1995	
Iron Soldier 2	Eclipse Software Design	Telegames	December 15, 1997	December 15, 1997	Unreleased	
Kasumi Ninja	Hand Made Software	Atari Corporation	December 21, 1994	December 1994	1995	
Missile Command 3D	Virtuality Entertainment	Atari Corporation	December 12, 1995	December 1995	Unreleased	
NBA Jam: Tournament Edition	High Voltage Software	Acclaim Entertainment, Atari Corporation	January 9, 1996	January 1996	Unreleased	
Pinball Fantasies	Spidersoft	Computer West ^{(NA)} 21st Century Entertainment ^{(EU/AU)}	June 9, 1995	July 1995	1995	
Pitfall: The Mayan Adventure	Imagitec Design	Activision, Atari Corporation	October 17, 1995	October 1995	Unreleased	
Power Drive Rally	Rage Software	Time Warner Interactive	October 9, 1995	October 1995	Unreleased	
Raiden	Imagitec Design	Atari Corporation; Mumin Corporation ^{(JP)}	November 23, 1993	June 1994	December 15, 1994	
Rayman	Ubi Pictures	Ubi Soft	September 19, 1995	1995	Unreleased	
Ruiner Pinball	High Voltage Software	Atari Corporation	November 6, 1995	December 1995	Unreleased	
Super Burnout	Shen Technologies	Atari Corporation, Virtual Xperience	July 5, 1995	July 1995	1995	
Supercross 3D	Tiertex Design Studios	Atari Corporation	December 20, 1995	January 1996	Unreleased	
Syndicate	Bullfrog Productions	Ocean Software	March 1995	February 1995	1995	
Tempest 2000	Llamasoft	Atari Corporation; Mumin Corporation ^{(JP)}	April 13, 1994	June 1994	December 15, 1994	
Theme Park	Bullfrog Productions	Ocean Software ^{(NA)} Atari Corporation ^{(EU/AU)}	March 1995	March 1995	1995	
Towers II: Plight of the Stargazer	JV Games	Telegames	December 10, 1996	December 10, 1996	Unreleased	
Trevor McFur in the Crescent Galaxy	Atari Corporation	Atari Corporation; Mumin Corporation ^{(JP)}	November 23, 1993	June 1994	January 13, 1995	
Troy Aikman NFL Football	Telegames	Williams Entertainment	March 1995	May 1995	1995	
Ultra Vortek	Beyond Games	Atari Corporation	September 13, 1995	September 1995	Unreleased	
Val d'Isère Skiing and Snowboarding	Virtual Studio	Atari Corporation	December 1994	January 1995	1995	
White Men Can't Jump	High Voltage Software	Atari Corporation	August 1, 1995	August 1995	Unreleased	
Wolfenstein 3D	id Software	Atari Corporation; Mumin Corporation ^{(JP)}	August 1, 1994	August 1994	December 15, 1994	
Worms	Team17	Telegames	May 15, 1998	May 15, 1998	Unreleased	
Zero 5	Caspian Software	Telegames	September 29, 1997	September 29, 1997	Unreleased	
Zool 2	Imagitec Design	Atari Corporation; Mumin Corporation ^{(JP)}	December 1994	January 1995	April 21, 1995	
Zoop	Electric Spectacle Productions	Atari Corporation, Viacom New Media	January 1996	January 1996	Unreleased	

=== CD ===
The official library includes 13 (Note: This number is always up to date by this script.) CD-ROM games.

Titles	Developers	Publishers	Release dates		Ref.
Titles	Developers	Publishers	NA	EU	Ref.
Baldies	Creative Edge Software	Atari Corporation	December 1995	December 1995	
Battlemorph	Attention to Detail	Atari Corporation	December 1995	December 1995	
Blue Lightning	Attention to Detail	Atari Corporation	September 21, 1995	September 21, 1995	
Brain Dead 13	ReadySoft	ReadySoft	March 15, 1996	May 1996	
Dragon's Lair	ReadySoft	ReadySoft	November 16, 1995	February 1996	
Highlander: The Last of the MacLeods	Lore Design Limited	Atari Corporation	October 30, 1995	October 1995	
Hover Strike: Unconquered Lands	Atari Corporation	Atari Corporation	October 23, 1995	October 1995	
Iron Soldier 2	Eclipse Software Design	Telegames	April 23, 1997	April 23, 1997	
Myst	Cyan, Inc.	Atari Corporation, Sunsoft	December 15, 1995	December 1995	
Primal Rage	Probe Entertainment	Time Warner Interactive	December 21, 1995	December 1995	
Space Ace	ReadySoft	ReadySoft	January 24, 1996	January 1996	
Vid Grid	High Voltage Software	Atari Corporation	September 21, 1995	September 21, 1995	
World Tour Racing	Teque London	Telegames	June 4, 1997	June 1997	

== See also ==
- Lists of video games
