= Phase Zero =

- Developer: Hyper Image Productions
- Publishers: B&C ComputerVisions, Songbird Productions (Demo)
- Director: Paul Good
- Producers: John Skruch; Ted Tahquechi
- Designer: Matías Duarte
- Programmers: Jeremy Gordon; Otávio Good
- Artist: Matías Duarte
- Composer: Andy Carlson
- Platform: Atari Jaguar
- Release: WW: June 2002 (Demo)
- Genre: Shooter
- Modes: Single-player, multiplayer

Phase Zero is an unfinished shooter video game that was being developed by Hyper Image Productions and would have been published by Atari for the Atari Jaguar. Set in the future on a terrestrial planet, the player takes on the role of a newcomer to the Phase Zero squad, piloting a hovercraft to fight rival corporate states. The player is tasked with various objectives while fighting enemies in multiple missions.

Phase Zero was the first project by Hyper Image, a game company led by Jeremy Gordon, Matías Duarte, and brothers Otávio Good and Paul Good. In 1994, the group took an academic hiatus and banded together to enter the video game industry by establishing Hyper Image. The game was initially conceived as a top-down shooter for the Super NES, but the team decided to move with Jaguar due to its powerful hardware, opting to use heightmaps for the graphics and support local area network (LAN) play for multiplayer. It was produced by Ted Tahquechi, who worked on Jaguar titles such as Cybermorph and Kasumi Ninja.

In 1996, Atari laid off several staff members amid rumors that they were leaving the console market, which included the departure of Tahquechi. Hyper Image suspended production of the game indefinitely pending word from Atari about its plans. Atari halted its development before ceasing production of the Jaguar and merging with JTS, resulting in Phase Zero not being released. After a demo was leaked online in 2000, publisher Songbird Productions tracked down former Hyper Image staff and obtained the rights to publish it alongside B&C ComputerVisions in 2002.

== Gameplay ==
The player's hovercraft engaging in combat with an enemy on a desert wasteland from the leaked demo of Phase Zero

Phase Zero is a three-dimensional shooter game played from a first-person perspective, similar to AirCars and Hover Strike. The premise takes place in the future on a terrestrial planet, where the player assumes the role of a newcomer to the Phase Zero squad, piloting a Hunter-class VTV hovercraft to fight the Pulsar Collective and the Miner's Consortium, two rival corporate states seeking control of the territory by the Foundation Prime corporation. The player is tasked with completing mission objectives, ranging from rescuing a stranded soldier to destroying enemies.

The player controls the hovercraft in a landscape featuring six degrees of freedom and destructible environments, while navigating through checkpoints and fighting enemies. The heads-up display of the hovercraft shows various functions such as shields, radar, and checkpoint markers, while the player can also open a map screen, balance the ship's shields, and select weapons. There are several types of weapons, but only four can be equipped at a time, while some missions may assign preset weapons to the player. The game contains nine missions set in a variety of landscapes and some have terrain features including deserts, ramps, rivers and hills.

Due to its unfinished nature, the game is prone to crashing and the player can only reach the fifth mission, which cannot be finished. Further missions are accessed via a cheat code. Although single-player mode works for four of the missions, accessing network mode crashes the game. The game was intended to support JagLink and CatBox for multiplayer.

== History ==
=== Development ===
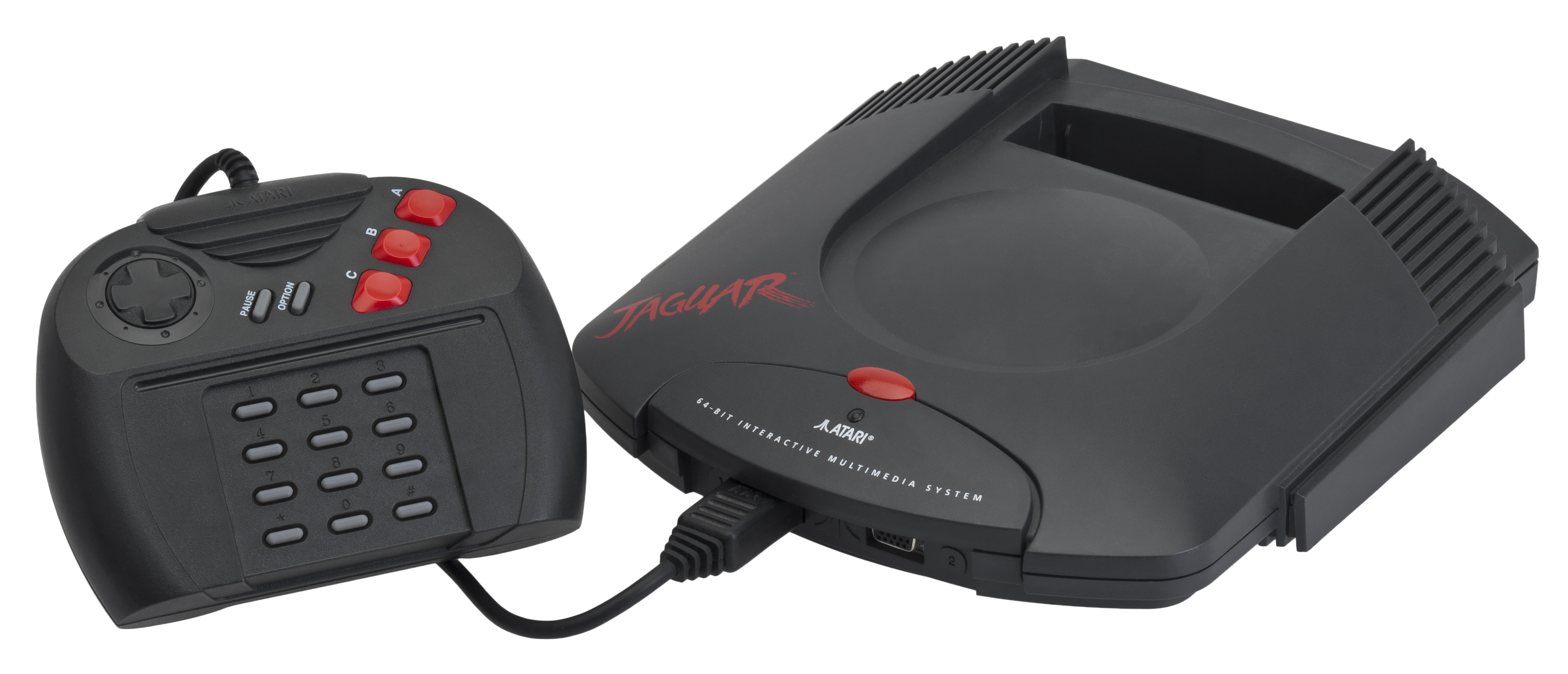
Phase Zero was conceived for the Super NES before Hyper Image decided to work with the Atari Jaguar for their first project due to its hardware.

Phase Zero was the first project by Hyper Image Productions, a Maryland-based game developer led by Jeremy Gordon, Matías Duarte, and brothers Otávio Good and Paul Good. Gordon met Duarte in high school and the Good brothers at the University of Maryland. In 1994, the group took an academic hiatus and banded together to enter the video game industry by establishing Hyper Image, with Paul investing the insurance money he received after suffering a car accident years earlier. They moved from an apartment to a house with four other members, including Bill Lanides, Andy Carlson, Sterling Krauss, and an intern known only as Damian. The game was originally conceived as a top-down shooter with exploration elements for the Super NES, but Hyper Image later signed to become a licensed game developer for the Jaguar. The team decided to go with Jaguar because they found its hardware to be powerful and support from Atari. It was produced by Ted Tahquechi of Atari, who worked on several Jaguar titles such as Cybermorph and Kasumi Ninja.

For the graphics, the team opted to use heightmaps, similar to the effect used in Comanche and CyberRace, where each landscape pixel has its own elevation value to represent a specific height from flat terrain, but would become too pixelated when viewed too close. To mitigate the problem, Gordon and Otávio devised a technique using the Jaguar's blitter dubbed "displacement texture mapping", which allowed for large and detailed interpolated heightmaps. Duarte was the lead game designer under direction of Paul and responsible for the artwork, creating a tile-based terrain system to build levels and supervising artists with visual assets. Krauss helped translate the design document written by Duarte into English. Carlson scored the music using Scream Tracker on PC, which was then converted with a sound driver written by Otávio. Local area network (LAN) support for multiplayer was also planned, as staff members were fans of network gaming.

=== Promotion ===
The game was first showcased at ToadFest '94 under the title Hover Hunter. More details were shared at the 1995 Winter Consumer Electronics Show, revealing support for CatBox and a release date in the second quarter of 1995. Hyper Image reportedly declined an offer with Nintendo, which was looking for developers to secure titles for its upcoming "Project Reality" system, to continue as an independent developer. It made other appearances at the 1995 ECTS Spring event and E3 1995. The game was featured at Atari during "Fun 'n' Games Day", an event to show upcoming Jaguar titles to journalists. It was covered by press invited to Atari's European offices under its final title, Phase Zero, but was delayed until September 1995. The game was also exhibited during the 1995 Toy Test held by CBS This Morning at the Pacific Science Center. It later appeared in a promotional recording sent by Atari to video game retail stores on October 9, 1995, and was scheduled for launch in November 1995.

The game garnered a positive response from attendees and impressed Atari developers at CES. It received favorable commentary from gaming publications prior to launch. Consoles + stated that the game would attract attention due to its impressive frame rate and controls. Atari Explorer Online's Adam Urbano said that it showed the Jaguar's hardware potential and expressed excitement over its realistic landscapes, smooth frame rate, and controls. CD Consoles proclaimed that Phase Zero would be one of the best Jaguar games, highlighting its audiovisual presentation, interactive environments, enemy AI, and freedom of movement. Hyper Image also noted the level of praise and feedback the team received from the public who followed its production.

=== Cancellation ===
In 1996, Atari laid off several members of its staff amid an internal restructuring to focus on software publishing and rumors that they were leaving the console market, which included the departure of Tahquechi, who was replaced by John Skruch as the game's producer. Atari planned to release it in late 1996, however, Beyond Games reported that Hyper Image suspended production of the game indefinitely pending word from Atari about its plans, which was later confirmed by Gordon in a statement on the company's website. Atari halted its development before ceasing production of the Jaguar and merging with JTS, resulting in Phase Zero not being released. That same year, the trademark for Hover Hunter, the game's original name, was abandoned.

The Hyper Image staff moved the company to San Francisco and renamed it MagicArts Corporation to pursue projects on Sega Saturn, PlayStation, and Windows 95 platforms. MagicArts worked on a Saturn port of Iron & Blood: Warriors of Ravenloft, but was cancelled by Acclaim as part of their withdrawal of support for Saturn. Sony hired MagicArts to develop two games for PlayStation but neither were released: Alien Earth/Legion (a 3D action shooter), and Yoyo's Adventure (a 3D platformer). Gordon, Otávio, and programmer Josh Adams decided to leave MagicArts and founded Secret Level, Inc. in 1999. Between 2003 and 2004, renewals of the Hyper Image brand were cancelled. Versions for other platforms were planned after the Jaguar version was discontinued and in 2018, former Sega Technical Institute (STI) programmer Jamie Bible stated on AtariAge that Hyper Image hired him for a Saturn port of Phase Zero due to his experience with heightmap engines, but it was ultimately cancelled.

== Release ==
In 1999, Hasbro Interactive declared the Atari Jaguar as an open platform, releasing the console's patents and rights into public domain after much lobbying from Atari fans, allowing software developers to make and release games for Jaguar without a licensing agreement. Following the announcement, hobbyists have produced homebrew games and released previously finished but unpublished titles. A demo of Phase Zero was leaked online by former Atari Explorer Online editor Mark Santora in 2000. In June 2002, publisher Songbird Productions contacted former Hyper Image Productions staff and obtained the rights to release the demo in conjunction with B&C ComputerVisions, a California-based company founded by Bruce and Cathy Carso in 1979. The publisher also stated that the original developers may still have the source code in order to complete the game. In 2004, Songbird re-released the demo, complete with packaging mimicking officially licensed Jaguar releases.
