= Protector (Atari Jaguar video game) =

- Cover art by Tony Ferguson
- Developer: Bethesda Softworks
- Publisher: Songbird Productions
- Producers: Christopher Weaver; Todd Howard
- Designer: Jørgen Bech
- Platform: Atari Jaguar
- Release: WW: November 27, 1999; WW: April 30, 2002 (SE); Resurgence: WW: October 23, 2014 (CD); WW: June 2024 (cartridge)
- Genre: Scrolling shooter
- Modes: Single-player, multiplayer

Protector is a scrolling shooter video game developed by Bethesda Softworks for the Atari Jaguar. The game was released in 1999, followed by the Special Edition in 2002 and the expansion pack Resurgence in 2014. The game takes place during a futuristic alien invasion of Earth, where the player pilots the Starblade to defend the planetoid Haven-7.

Protector was designed by Danish developer Jørgen Bech. Produced by Christopher Weaver and Todd Howard, the project came about after Bech had time to understand the Jaguar's capabilities. Bech developed a game similar to Defender (1981), but Atari refused to publish it due to their work on Defender 2000, with Bethesda cancelling the project due to the Jaguar's decline. After Atari dropped support for the Jaguar, a programmer named Carl Forhan revived the project by reaching out to Bech on a Usenet forum and licensing the game from Bethesda. Hasbro Interactive later made the Jaguar an open platform, allowing Forhan to finish and publish the game under his studio, Songbird Productions.

Protector and the special edition earned critical acclaim; Praise was given to the audiovisual presentation, controls, and gameplay, but some were divided regarding the difficulty curve. The game sold 100 copies in the first year, with the special edition selling 500 copies by 2002, making it Songbird's best-selling Jaguar title. In retrospect, game critics have ranked it as one of the best games for the Jaguar.

== Gameplay ==
The Starblade ship evades enemy bullets and shoots down an enemy while Landers try to pick up humans.

Protector is a scrolling shooter game similar to Defender (1981) and Defender 2000. The story is set in a future where an interstellar war erupts after alien forces arrive on Earth. The inhabitants of a nearby planetoid called Haven-7 are left to fend for themselves, with the Starblade ship as their only defense. The player commands the Starblade, protecting Haven-7 against waves of invading aliens. The Starblade can fly from left to right, with a radar showing both dangers and humans across the level. Enemy landers pick up humans and attempt to transport them to the top of the screen for mutation, but the player can interrupt this by shooting them down. The player's ship has a standard laser fire and smart bombs capable of destroying enemies within their blast radius.

The player advances through each level by defeating all the enemies. There are over 40 levels in total. On certain levels, the player must survive a meteor shower or fight a boss. Enemies sometimes drop red orbs, which the player can spend at a shop between levels, allowing them to purchase items such as shields, bombs, extra lives, and rapid fire. Some enemies instead drop green pods, offering power-ups such as energy, hyperspace jumps, or "Protectors" that block enemy landers from kidnapping humans. The player can endure three hits before losing a life, forcing them to restart the level with only their basic firepower. In addition, the game allows two players to play by alternating turns.

== Development ==
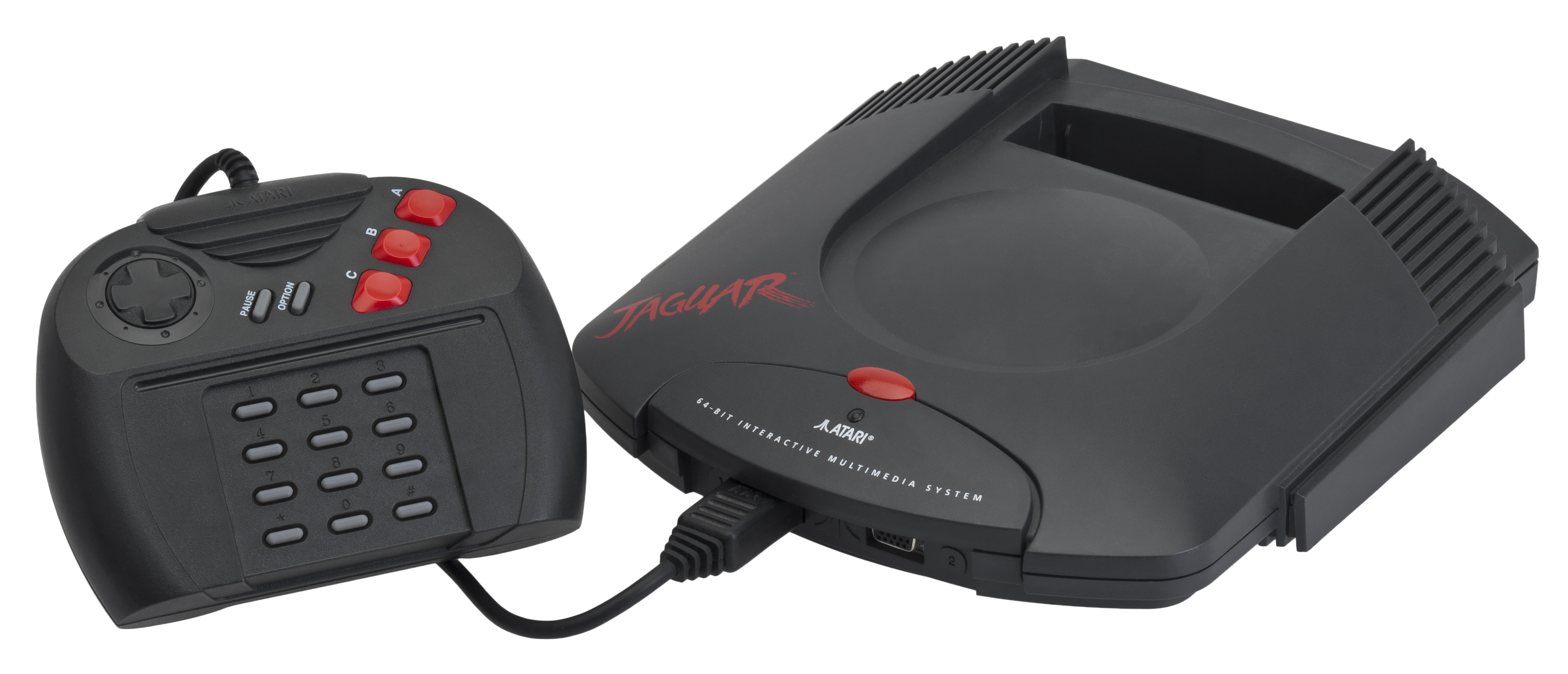
Protector began as a test project in 1994, but was not published until 1999, after the Atari Jaguar was declared an open platform by Hasbro Interactive.

Protector began development under Bethesda Softworks, a Maryland-based game studio founded by Christopher Weaver in 1986. It was executive produced by Weaver and Todd Howard. The game was designed by Danish developer Jørgen Bech, who worked on Globulus for the Amiga, Spider-Man for the Master System, and several other titles for the ZX Spectrum. Bech had left the video game industry after his negative experience working at Innerprise Software, but took a job at Bethesda after an acquaintance connected him with the company. In 1994, Bethesda received free Atari Jaguar development kits and initially tasked Bech with porting NCAA Basketball: Road to the Final Four 2 to the Jaguar. However, due to his lack of 3D programming experience, they decided he should first familiarize himself with the hardware by working on a solo port of Søren Grønbech's Datastorm (1989). Bech decided against making a direct conversion, as the Jaguar's capabilities exceeded those of the Amiga and wanted to make a game closer to Defender (1981).

Bech decided to code the game in assembly to maximize its frame rate and work with the Jaguar's limited GPU. Sprites were kept small to prevent memory issues with the Jaguar’s object processor, while the number of active on-screen objects were maintained by lists. Graphics and backgrounds came from a CD of royalty-free images. The hyperspace jump effect was created with Alias PowerAnimator on an SGI workstation, and pre-rendered sprites were made by Bech using 3D Studio. The player's ship and humanoid sprites from Datastorm remained in the game, and the title screen used a cropped scan of the Datastorm box art. Now titled Protector, the game was fully playable by March 1995, but Atari did not want to publish it due to perceived competition with Defender 2000. Weaver decided Bethesda would not publish it due to the Jaguar's decline. Bethesda cancelled Protector and halted all work on Jaguar, prompting Bech's departure the following month. Atari proposed using the game's engine for an update of Gates of Zendocon, one of several Atari Lynx titles from Epyx selected to be remade on Jaguar, but Weaver was uninterested. Atari dropped support for the Jaguar soon after.

Years later, a programmer named Carl Forhan began searching for unreleased Jaguar games that he might license and finish on his own. In 1998, he saw Bech discuss Protector on a Usenet forum. Forhan asked Bech to share the game's source code with him so he could publish it, however, Bech told Forhan that he must seek Weaver's consent since Bethesda had the rights to the title. Forhan initially obtained the rights to view the source code for educational use only, but eventually managed to secure a license to publish the game. The following year, Forhan founded Songbird Productions to complete Protector and other unreleased titles he had licensed from former Atari developers. That same year, Atari fans successfully lobbied Hasbro Interactive to release the console's patents and rights into the public domain, transforming the Jaguar into an open game development platform. Forhan proceeded to finish the game with his own improvements, including a reworked enemy AI and power-up scheme, and fixing bugs in the original source code. He was loaned a flash cartridge to help with development and teamed up with hobbyist Scott Walters, who devised a solution to bypass encryption, since all Jaguar games must be encrypted to run on the hardware.

== Release ==
Protector was first showcased at the 1999 Classic Gaming Expo, followed by a playable demo at the Atari Jaguar-focused JagFest '99. Songbird Productions published the game on November 27, 1999, with its packaging modelled after official Jaguar releases. The cover art was created by Tony Ferguson.

Forhan decided to improve the game based on feedback from the Jaguar fandom, leading to the announcement of Protector: Special Edition at JagFest 2K1. It was initially scheduled for April 10, 2002, but delays in cartridge production postponed the release date to April 30, 2002. The special edition offers more graphics, new enemies, revised gameplay and bug fixes. The game includes JagFree CD and BJL, program loaders that allow users to play unencrypted Atari Jaguar CD titles and assist with homebrew game development, respectively. Each copy came bundled with a demo of Native for the Jaguar CD.

An expansion pack called Protector: Resurgence was released for the Jaguar CD in 2014. It features new graphics, music, enemies, and gameplay mechanics when the special edition cartridge is attached. In 2024, a cartridge edition of Resurgence was released as a limited run of 100 copies at JagFest 2024.

== Reception ==
Reception

Review scores
Publication	Score
GamesTM	(SE) 6/10
Video Games (DE)	5/5
The Atari Times	95%
Jaguar Front Page News	7/10
neXGam	(SE) 8.8/10

According to Forhan, Protector sold 100 copies in the first year, with the special edition selling 500 copies by 2002, making it Songbird's best-selling title for the Atari Jaguar. The game also received acclaim from critics.

GameFan's Eric Mylonas felt the game was a standard but solid Defender-style shooter. Video Games' Ralph Karels lauded its gameplay and smooth performance, but noted that the game's visuals may not impress. The Atari Times' Bruce Clarke found the game to be a very good Defender clone and praised both its audiovisual and game feel, but criticized the unbalanced difficulty level. Mike Dolce of Jaguar Front Page News (a part of the GameSpy network) stated that "If you are a big Defender fan, you should not live without this game. It's very fun, but very challenging". Author Andy Slaven highlighted the game's audiovisual presentation, controls, and old-school playability.

The special edition later earned a reputation as one of the best Jaguar games. GamesTM ranked it as one of the most fun Jaguar titles, stating that it offered a decent take on the gameplay of the original Defender compared to Defender 2000. They also highlighted its audiovisual elements, game feel, and difficulty curve. Retro Gamer found the game better than Defender 2000 and praised it for having some of the best 2D graphics on the Jaguar. Reviewing the special edition in 2009, neXGam commended its simple graphics, additional content, and fast-paced intuitive gameplay. PCMag considered it the definitive version of Protector, while Time Extension deemed it better than the original release due to its new features and content.
