= Painter (video game) =

- Title screen
- Developer: Sinister Developments
- Publishers: Sinister Developments; Definitive Edition: Reboot Games (2024); AtariAge (2026)
- Platforms: Atari ST, Atari Jaguar CD, Atari Jaguar
- Release: EU: July 1994 (ST); WW: August 8, 2003 (Jaguar CD); Definitive Edition: WW: 2024 (Reboot Games); WW: April 2026 (AtariAge)
- Genres: Action, puzzle
- Mode: Single-player

Painter is a 1994 action-puzzle video game developed and published by Sinister Developments for the Atari ST. In the game, the player guides a sprite across a grid to fill enclosed areas.

Sinister initially released Painter for the Atari ST as shareware. Players could also register the game through Sinister to receive a full version with additional levels and a level editor. The full version was later made available as freeware. An Atari Jaguar CD version with new levels was released in 2003. Between 2024 and 2026, publisher Reboot Games and AtariAge released a licensed cartridge version featuring new levels.

Painter received a generally favorable reception, with reviewers praising the gameplay, digitized sound effects, and smooth presentation. Other reviewers felt the game was fun but dated, with criticism directed at minor bugs and the lack of save support.

== Gameplay ==
The player's white sprite character paints the grid and an enemy roams the area

Painter is an action-puzzle game in which the player controls a white sprite character. The objective of the game is to paint all the lines in a grid to fill the enclosed blocks by guiding the character around them. Enemies roam the area chasing the player and must be avoided by making holes in the grid, temporarily preventing both the enemies and the player from passing over them. The player also faces a time limit for completing each grid. Once all the lines are painted and the grid areas are filled with color, the player advances to the next level. The game has over 100 levels, each containing a set of intersecting blocks. Levels become increasingly complex as the player progresses, introducing invisible grid lines, shorter time limits, and intricate layouts. Progress can be resumed using passwords given after completing each level.

== Development and release ==
Painter was developed by Sinister Developments, an Edinburgh-based independent programming team founded by Gordon Gibson. Sinister had previously created shareware ports of arcade games such as Asteroids, Centipede, Galaxian and Space Invaders for the Amiga, Atari ST and PC platforms.

Painter was released as shareware for the Atari ST in July 1994 through bulletin board systems and public domain libraries. The game was also distributed by Sinister via registration, with 100 additional levels and a level designer. It was included as a covermount with the July 1994 issue of Atari ST User and bundled with Starball, a pinball game, as part of disk number GD2315 from Goodman International. The game was later re-released as freeware. A version of Painter was planned as a hidden feature in Slam Racer, an unfinished racing game Sinister was developing for Atari Jaguar. In 1996, the Jaguar version was made available for download via unofficial development kits that load software onto the console.

On August 8, 2003, Sinister released an Atari Jaguar CD version with 100 new levels, requiring a bypass cartridge or boot program to run. A special JagFest edition with 20 exclusive levels was also released at the 2003 Classic Gaming Expo. In 2008, AtariAge user "omf" released a cartridge version for the Jaguar in both regular and special editions. This cartridge version was also sold by Nick Harlow of 16/32 Systems at E-JagFest 2009, an event dedicated to the Jaguar scene. In 2024, publisher Reboot Games released a licensed cartridge edition titled Painter: Definitive Edition limited to 50 copies, featuring new levels. In April 2026, AtariAge released the Definitive Edition at the Midwest Gaming Classic and on its online store.

== Reception ==
Painter received generally favorable reviews. ST Review's Nial Grimes found it highly playable, highlighting the crisp sound effects and smooth presentation. Atari ST User described it as a simple but "addictive" game, noting that it remains playable despite the sparse graphics. Atari Explorer Online's Michael R. Burkley called it a "fast-paced and thinking person's game". While ST Format's Nick Peers felt the game was fun, he also criticized the gameplay as dated, with little to keep players coming back.

MyAtari's Graeme Hinchliffe praised its addictive gameplay and soundtrack, but criticized minor bugs and the lack of memory save support. David Sherwin of The Atari Times felt that the game's minimalist visuals suited its arcade-style gameplay and abstract theme, and also praised its music and digitized voice samples.
