= American Hero (video game) =

- Promotional poster
- Developer: Inter-Active Productions
- Publishers: Original release: NA/EU: Atari Corporation; Relaunch: WW: Various; Remastered version: WW: Ziggurat Interactive
- Director: Jeff Burr
- Producers: David A. Jackson; Eric M. Breiman
- Designer: David M. Schwartz
- Artists: Flip Filippelli; John Leonhardt; Mathias Fain
- Writers: David Brandes; Greg Gieras
- Composers: Jay Flood; Mark Holden
- Engine: GameFilm
- Platform: Windows
- Release: Original release: NA/EU: Cancelled; Relaunch: WW: April 2003; Remastered version: WW: 2021
- Genre: Interactive movie
- Mode: Single-player

American Hero is an adult-oriented interactive movie that was in development by Inter-Active Productions and planned to be published by Atari Corporation for the Atari Jaguar CD and PC. It was one of the planned titles that would have made use of the GameFilm, a then-newly developed in-house interactive movie format conceived by former Atari Corp. employee David Schwartz during his time at the company that was first used in Caves of Fear, which served as technology demonstration of the format. In addition to being produced and designed by Schwartz, American Hero starred several Hollywood actors such as Timothy Bottoms, Gustav Vintas, Daniel Roebuck, Lawrence Tierney, and Musetta Vander.

In the game, players take the role of former military intelligence operative Jack Devon, tasked by his ex-partner Hoover with finding a missing biologist (and former crush), Laura, who developed an antidote to a deadly virus created by germ warfare specialist Karl Von Kruger. Kruger had already begun spreading the virus through Los Angeles' water supply network in order to take control of the United States, and Jack was assigned to stop Kruger before his chemical weapon managed to be spread nationwide.

Despite the film being completed, American Hero was never turned into a full-fledge GameFilm. Due to the commercial failure of the Atari Jaguar, the project was cancelled and left unreleased as a result. A year later, director Jeff Burr shot new footage in order to remake the project into a more linear movie version; however, the negatives were damaged during the cutting process and was deemed to be a loss, leaving the planned film version unreleased as well.

Playable prototype builds for both the Jaguar CD and PC, as well as the source code of American Hero, have since been released and sold online by independent groups such as B&C Computervisions and the defunct Jaguar Sector II website, among others. It has also been showcased across fan festivals dedicated to the system such as JagFest UK. An official PC version restored and remastered featuring a newly recorded voiceover by Timothy Bottoms was released digitally in 2021 on GOG.com, developed by Empty Clip Studios and published by Ziggurat Interactive.

== Gameplay ==
Gameplay screenshot showcasing one of the game's multiple scenes after making a decision.

As with Atari's Caves of Fear, American Hero is an interactive movie game that uses full-motion video (FMV) to present the story and gameplay, similar to Digital Pictures' Sewer Shark and Netflix's Black Mirror: Bandersnatch, where players are instructed by the in-game text messages or a subliminal voice heard on the background to make Jack Devon perform a choice under quick time events by pressing the A button on the controller, which can alter the course of the narrative and create a branching storyline, leading to different outcomes on each playthrough such as having the main character killed by enemies or setpieces. Due to its use of the GameFilm technology, scenes play and alter between each other without visible pausing, streamlining the experience and giving them a smooth narrative flow as a result, unlike most FMV titles released at the time. The main objective of the game is to find biologist Laura and stop Karl Von Kruger from spreading his virus nationwide. The game also features uncensored cutscenes, with visible nudity.

== Development and initial cancellation ==
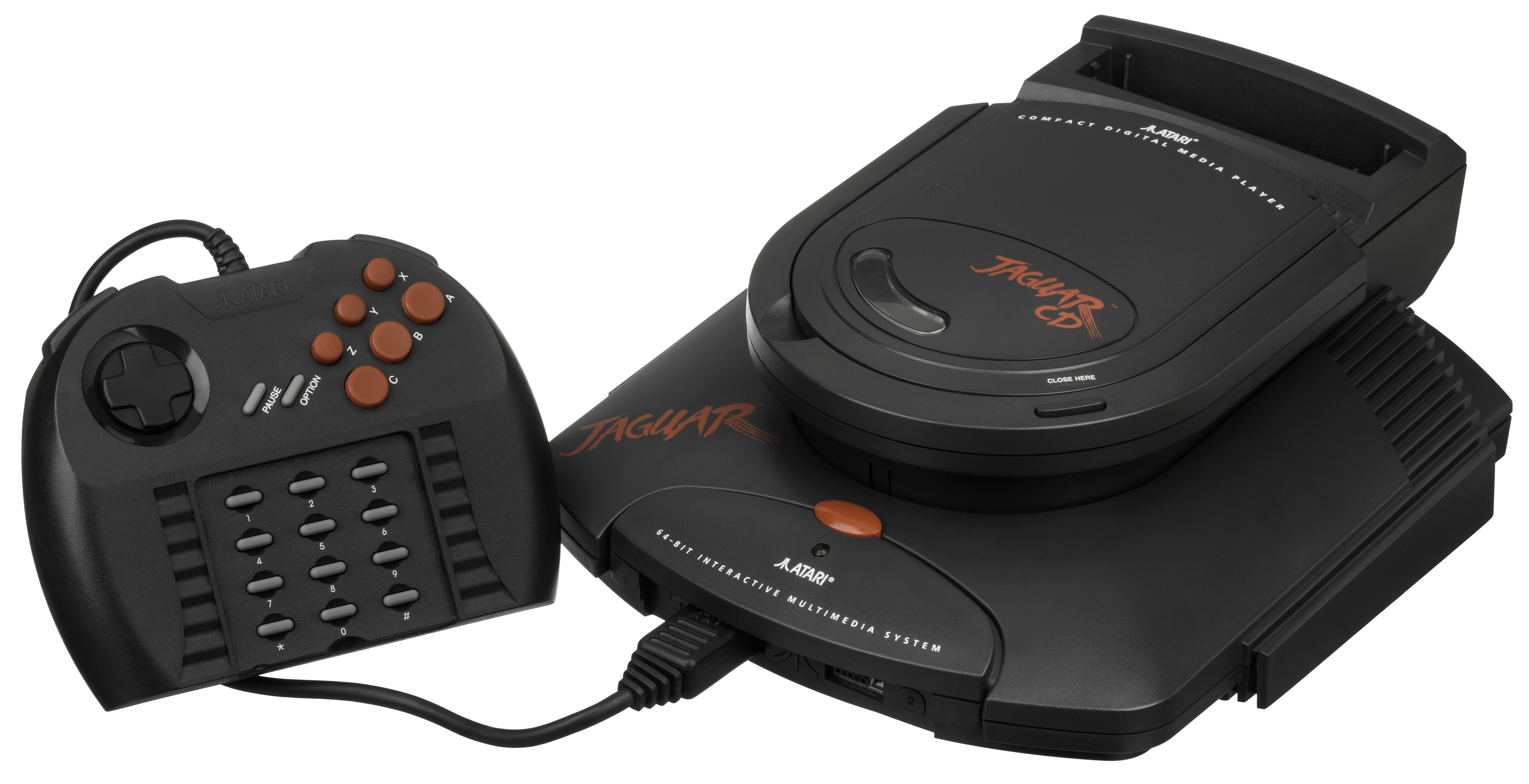
American Hero was shelved due to the commercial failure of the Atari Jaguar and Jaguar CD platforms.

American Hero was produced and designed by David M. Schwartz, creator of the then-newly developed in-house interactive movie format GameFilm. Schwartz was also previously involved with the aforementioned Caves of Fear. GameFilm allowed for data to be arranged in clips with multiple segments, enabling them to be spliced together seamlessly when played in series. The soundtrack was composed by Mark Holden. Although the filming process for the project was complete, it was never turned into a full-fledged game and was cancelled due to the commercial failure of the Atari Jaguar. Jeff Burr shot new scenes a year later in hopes of remaking it into a feature film, but since the film negatives were damaged during the cutting phase, it was deemed a loss for the producers at Showcase Entertainment, and the project remained unfinished.

== Release ==
Sometime in the 2000s, a playable prototype build of American Hero for Jaguar CD was found by Atari historian and video game collector Glenn Bruner, with homebrew programmer Scott Walters writing a CD booting program to run the title. In 2003, community member Stone of AtariAge produced a limited run of the Jaguar CD version, complete with custom artwork and case, which was sold and showcased at the fan festival JagFest UK 2003. On September 13 of the same year, Atari historian Curt Vendel released the Jaguar GameFilm engine for free online, which contained material related to the game. It was also made available to be downloaded for free by defunct website Jaguar Sector II and for purchase in physical format by B&C Computervisions. From July to August 2008, a build of the PC version and the game's source code was made available for sale by Jaguar Sector II under CD compilations for PC titled American Hero PC Files & Beta and Jaguar Source Code Collection respectively. A restored version of the game was released for Windows in 2021 by Ziggurat Interactive and Empty Clip Studios, featuring newly recorded dialogue by Timothy Bottoms, using the RapidFire Engine.
