= Mad Bodies =

2009 video game

- Developer: FORCE Design
- Publisher: FORCE Design
- Designer: Terance Williams
- Programmer: Terance Williams
- Artist: Terance Williams
- Composer: Aki Nordman
- Platform: Atari Jaguar
- Release: WW: May 2, 2009
- Genres: Action, shoot 'em up
- Mode: Single-player

Mad Bodies is an action-shoot 'em up video game developed and published by FORCE Design for the Atari Jaguar. The plot follows ETHunter, Clay, Skip, Thunderbird, and Wes participating in the Dark Knight Games tournament to stop The Graphics Man, who merged reality with his mind to rule the universe. The player controls a paddle-shaped ship, equipped with a square reticle, to prevent planetoids from bouncing off the screen while dodging waves of enemies.

Mad Bodies was the first Jaguar title from FORCE Design, a company founded by freelance artist Terance "The Graphics Man" Williams. Williams decided to create his own game after learning about the Jaguar scene thanks to Steven Scavone of 3D Stooges Software Studios. He participated in the production as a designer, programmer, and artist. The game was initially planned for the Atari Jaguar CD, but FORCE Design scrapped the idea and decided releasing it on cartridge instead. The development took six years, as the team worked on it in their spare time.

Mad Bodies received mixed reception from critics. Praise was given for its graphics and gameplay, but others were divided regarding the soundtrack, with criticisms focused on its controls, difficulty curve, and vagueness regarding objectives.

== Gameplay ==
A powered-up ship, holding astronauts in its reticle near a space station, bouncing off projectiles from the first boss in Mad Bodies

Mad Bodies is an arcade-style action-shoot 'em up game. Publications such as The Escapist, ReVival, and RetroKomp have described it as a mix between Breakout, Space Invaders, and Arkanoid. Other outlets like Jagwired Magazine and the ThumbPad podcast have also described it as a mix between Pong and Xevious. The story revolves around ETHunter, Clay, Skip, Thunderbird, and Wes, who participate in the Dark Knight Games tournament, jointly organized by Dave Vapourware, to stop The Graphics Man, who merged reality with his mind to dominate the universe.

The player controls a paddle-shaped ship, moving from left to right to prevent planetoids from bouncing off the screen while dodging waves of enemies. The ship is equipped with a square reticle for shooting enemies and planetoids. The height of the reticle is adjustable and follows the movement of the ship. The player can rescue stranded astronauts using the reticle and place them on a space station. Depending on the number of astronauts, the player receives points, a power-up item that repairs the ship and activates a jump function, or increased firepower. Maximum firepower is achieved by keeping six astronauts in the reticle and not placing them on a space station. The player can also perform a horizontal dash maneuver.

Destroying all enemies in a wave grants bonus points. There are a total of ten rounds, each of increasing difficulty, and some include a boss battle. Bosses can only be damaged if the player bounces their spherical projectile until it turns purple. The ship takes damage from enemy fire, a fireball, or if the player misses a planetoid. A life is lost if the ship takes enough damage, but the player can obtain extra lives by reaching predetermined score thresholds. The game is over once all lives are lost, however the player has the option to continue.

== Development and release ==
Mad Bodies was developed by FORCE Design, a company founded by freelance artist Terance "The Graphics Man" Williams in 1998. Williams became interested in everything related to science, computing, animation, comics, and video games from elementary school onwards and decided to combine all his interests because they would complement each other. His nickname "The Graphics Man" came about after finishing high school, as his friends called him that because he liked to play video games and could do all kinds of art, both with and without a computer. Under FORCE Design, Williams's early work consisted of graphic design for musical artists, companies, and individuals, ranging from business cards to video games.

Steven Scavone, a member of 3D Stooges Software Studios, introduced Williams to the Atari Jaguar scene and he was drawn to the console's appeal. Williams decided to create his own game, with Mad Bodies being his and FORCE Design's first Jaguar title. He participated in the production as a designer, programmer, and artist, with Scott Walters assisting with hardware programming. The music was composed by Aki Nordman. Williams also handled the game's sound effects and voice acting alongside Scavone. The game was initially planned for the Atari Jaguar CD, but FORCE Design scrapped the idea in 2003 and decided to release it on cartridge instead. The team worked on its development in their spare time for six years.

Mad Bodies was first unveiled at the 2003 Midwest Gaming Classic. The game reappeared at the 2004 Classic Computing and Gaming (CCAG) show, where it reportedly received a positive response from attendees. It was also showcased at the 2005 VideoGame Expo (VGXPO), formerly known as PhillyClassic. The game was published by FORCE Design as a limited run on May 2, 2009, packaged in a clamshell case.

== Reception ==
Reception

Review scores
Publication	Score
ClassicVGM	9.5/10
ReVival	6/10
Video Game Trader	1.5/5

Mad Bodies received mixed reviews from critics. Aleks Svetislav, from the ThumbPad podcast, remarked that the game was very frantic but addictive, and highlighted its minimalist retro-style graphics, its music reminiscent of 1980s science fiction soundtracks, and its digitized voice samples. Mike Pittaro of Classic Video Gamer Magazine praised the game's graphics, techno-style music, and imaginative gameplay, but criticized its high difficulty.

Cyril Denis of ReVival found the game moderately fun and its graphics quite pleasing, but noted that the soundtrack was average at best, while the inconsistent difficulty curve, the occasional freezing in the middle of the action to load data, and the lack of a rapid-fire feature were seen as drawbacks. Roberth Dutcher of Jagwired Magazine stated that Mad Bodies was very difficult and that the game's relentless action may anger some people. Peter G. of Video Game Trader commended the game's music, but faulted its frustrating control scheme and vagueness regarding objectives.

== Legacy ==
Mad Bodies was the only Atari Jaguar game made by FORCE Design, but more titles have been in development. Others include Gorf Pluz Earth God's Troopers (a remake of the arcade game Gorf), Legion Force Jidai (a Metal Slug-style game), Craze (a Berzerk-style game), and MightyFrog (a Q*bert-style game). Gorf Pluz was showcased at the 2001 Classic Gaming Expo, where Jamie Fenton, the original developer of Gorf, played it and was reportedly enthusiastic. Later that same year, a demo of Legion Force Jidai was shown at E-JagFest, an event dedicated to the Jaguar scene. MightyFrog was unveiled at the 2004 CCAG show and was showcased alongside Mad Bodies at the 2005 VGXPO. In 2024, Terance Williams submitted MightyFrog as an entry for a Jaguar game compo at the 2024 winter edition of Silly Venture, a Polish demoscene party.
