= Atari Karts =

1995 video game

- Cover art by Jen Smith
- Developer: Miracle Designs
- Publisher: Atari Corporation
- Producers: Bill Rehbock; Loïc Duval
- Programmers: Filip Hautekeete; Peter Vermeulen
- Composer: Fabrice Gillet
- Platform: Atari Jaguar
- Release: NA: December 22, 1995; EU: January 1996
- Genre: Kart racing
- Modes: Single-player, multiplayer

Atari Karts is a kart racing video game developed by Miracle Designs and published by Atari Corporation for the Atari Jaguar in North America on December 22, 1995, and Europe in January 1996. In the game, the players take control of one of several playable characters, each with differing capabilities. One or two players race against computer-controlled characters in four cups consisting of multiple tracks over four difficulty levels. During races, the players can obtain power-ups placed at predetermined points in the tracks and use them to gain an advantage. It plays similarly to Super Mario Kart and features Bentley Bear, main protagonist of the arcade game Crystal Castles (1983).

Atari Karts started production when programmers Filip Hautekeete and Peter Vermeulen received a development kit for the Jaguar from Atari, creating a demo featuring an emulated interpretation of Mode 7, a graphics mode seen in the Super Nintendo Entertainment System. Impressed with the demo, Atari decided to make a game that combined F-Zero and Super Mario Kart with a cutesy atmosphere, suggesting the usage of Bentley Bear and other Atari characters that did not make it into the final release.

Atari Karts garnered a mixed reception from critics and retrospective commentators, all of which compared it to Super Mario Kart. Miracle Designs began development on a sequel after release but never moved forward beyond the planning phase; however, Merlin Racing (2000) for Nuon is considered a spiritual successor to the game. In 2022, the game was included as part of the Atari 50 compilation.

== Gameplay ==
Gameplay screenshot, showing Bentley Bear with a wheel power-up racing on a snow track

Atari Karts is a kart racing game similar to Super Mario Kart featuring single-player and multiplayer modes, where the main goal is to finish a race ahead of other racers controlled by the computer and other players. Before each race, a traffic light will appear to start countdown and the race begins when the light turns green. The players take control of one of seven characters available at the start of the game, each with differing capabilities, and drive karts around tracks from a third-person perspective behind the player's kart. When selecting a character, another player can join at any given time. Among the roster of racers, Bentley Bear from Crystal Castles (1983) is a playable character. The players can access an options menu where various settings can be changed such as controls and the type of terrain display when racing.

The players race against computer-controlled characters in three cups consisting of multiple tracks over four difficulty levels. The player can access the "Miracle Race" challenge by winning all of the three cups at the selected difficulty level of challenge, but only the easiest difficulty is initially available. In the Miracle Race, one or two players race against one of four boss characters and when defeated, they become playable characters. There are 11 playable characters in total. As with Super Mario Kart, each cup consists of five-lap races and each one takes place on a distinct track, with more being unlocked on higher difficulties but in order to continue through a cup, a fourth or higher position must be achieved in each race. If a player finishes in fifth to eighth position, they are "ranked out" and the race must be replayed at the cost of one of a limited number of lives until a placing of fourth or above is earned.

During the gameplay, there are power-ups placed at predetermined points in the tracks as tiles. These power-ups give special abilities that can either benefit or harm a player's kart if the vehicle passes over them. Some of the power-ups include a rabbit icon that give players a speed boost for a few seconds, as well as a red icon that reverses the vehicle's controls for brief period of time. During two-player races, a green icon that reverses the opponent's controls is the only offensive power-up available on the game. If the player has no lives when they rank out, the game is over, though players can pick up a heart icon placed in a fixed spot of the track for an extra life. The game features support for the ProController.

== Development ==
Because [Super] Mario Kart was huge and selling like hotcakes, [Atari Corporation] upper management came down and said we need to have a Mario Kart game. That was the whole mandate for that. Create the memorable characters and have the fun kart experience.

— Former Atari Corporation senior producer Ted Tahquechi in a 2024 interview with The Atari Network.

Atari Karts was developed by the Belgian group Miracle Designs. The team wanted to make video games after visiting Visual Impact, a Ghent-based development company founded in 1994 by Kris Van Lier and Claude Verstraeten, who were working on Hyper Force for the Atari Jaguar. They walked into the Atari booth at the ECTS and applied to be developers, receiving a Jaguar development kit and resulting in Miracle Designs' formation. Filip Hautekeete and Peter Vermeulen began working with the kit, creating a demo showing an emulated interpretation of Mode 7, a graphics mode found on the Super Nintendo Entertainment System, to test the Jaguar's capabilities and sent it to Atari producers Bill Rehbock and J. Patton. Impressed with the demo, Atari decided to make a title that combined F-Zero and Super Mario Kart with a cutesy atmosphere, becoming the starting point for the game's production.

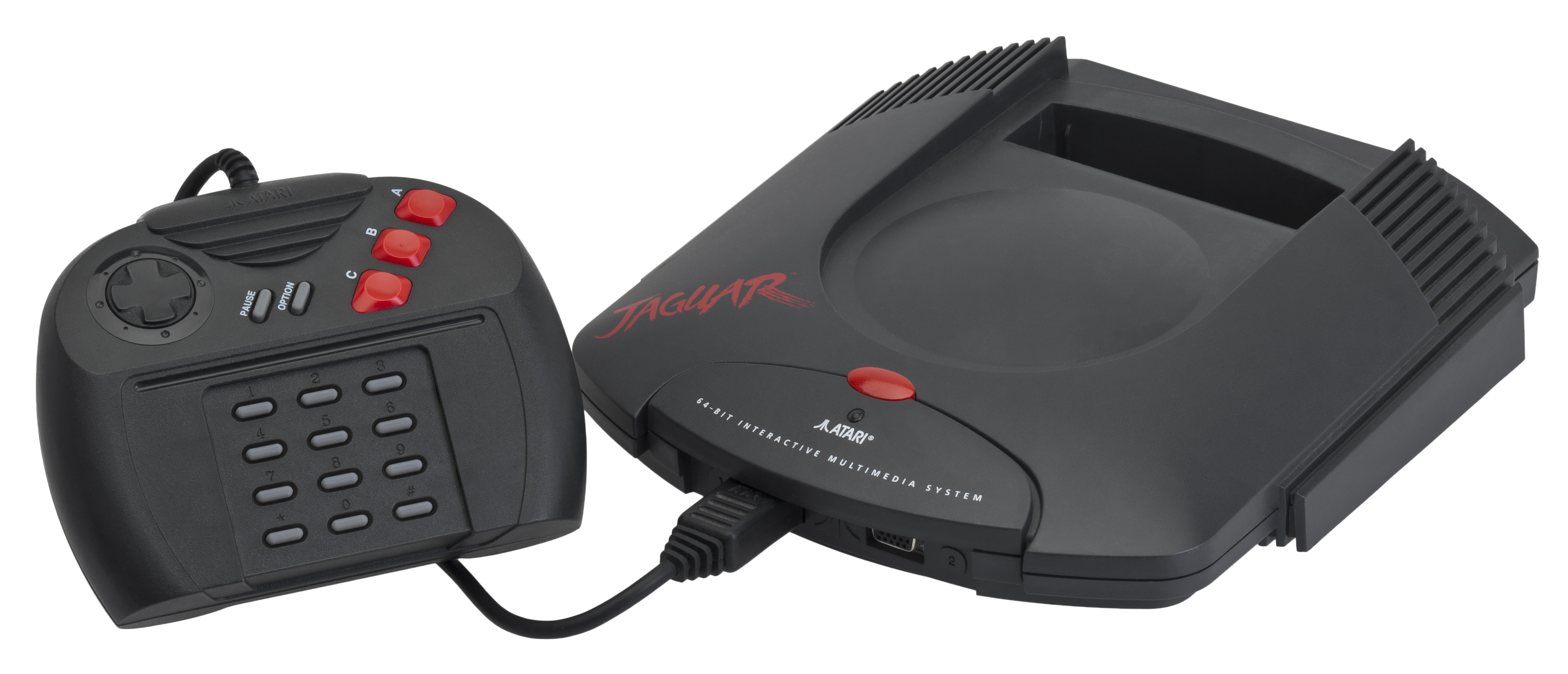
The Mode 7 demo created by Miracle Design for the Atari Jaguar became the basis of development for Atari Karts.

The game was co-produced by Rehbock and Loïc Duval, with Hautekeete and Vermeulen acting as co-programmers. The soundtrack was composed in Protracker by Fabrice "Arpegiator" Gillet of the Amiga demoscene group Chryseis. Neither Gillet nor the people responsible for the artwork are listed in the game's credits, with the instruction manual just referring to them as the "Miracle Designs Team", though Duval and Jen Smith provided additional graphics and sound. Smith was also responsible for the cover illustration.

Atari Karts makes extensive use of the Mode 7 technique made by Hautekeete and Vermeulen for the Jaguar, featuring raised and lowered terrains when racing on tracks. Rehbock suggested the usage of Bentley Bear, main protagonist of Crystal Castles (1983), along with other Atari characters that did not make it into the final release. The game features homages to Atari's history and games; The Borregas cup is a reference to the company's former address (1196 Borregas Avenue, Sunnyvale, California), while the Tempest cup is named after Dave Theurer's Tempest (1981). Production of the game took fourteen months and development was completed by December 11, 1995.

== Release ==
The game was formally announced in early 1995 under the working titles Kart and Super Kart. It was also previewed under the name Super Karts, which led to confusion in a supplementary 1995 issue by Edge magazine that Virgin Interactive's SuperKarts was being converted to the Jaguar. Additional internal documentation from and magazines listed the game under the name Atari Kart, being advertised with a September 1995 launch window. It was first showcased to attendees at the 1995 ECTS Autumn event. The game was also featured in a promotional recording sent by Atari to video game retail stores on October 9, and shown during an event hosted by Atari dubbed "Fun 'n' Games Day" under its final title, Atari Karts. The game was first published in North America on December 22, 1995, and later in Europe in January 1996.

In 2022, Atari Karts was included as part of the Atari 50 compilation for Nintendo Switch, PlayStation 4, Steam, and Xbox One, marking its first re-release. In 2025, publisher Songbird Productions, in association with Atari, made a re-release of the game limited to 250 copies.

== Reception ==
Reception

Review scores
Publication	Score
Computer and Video Games	24/100
Electronic Gaming Monthly	5.5/10, 5/10
Game Informer	5/10
M! Games	72%
Mega Fun	61%
Next Generation	3/5
Video Games (DE)	72%
Atari Fan	92/100
Fun Generation	8/10
ST-Computer	85%
ST Magazine	80%
Última Generación	68/100

Atari Karts garnered a mixed reception from critics, all of which compared it to Super Mario Kart. GameFan's Dan Granett found the game visually impressive for Atari Jaguar standards, citing the use of details, colors, and parallax-scrolling backgrounds. Nevertheless, Granett criticized its lack of depth and easy completion, as well as the soundtrack. Mega Fun's Ulf Schneider commended the karts for being easy to control and the colorful bitmap graphics but expressed mixed thoughts about the audio. Schneider ultimately felt that the game did not measure up to Mario Kart. He also noted the difficulty of drifting in curves using the keypad while driving. German publication ST-Computer concurred with Schneider on most points but recommended the game to Jaguar owners, highlighting its split-screen multiplayer. In contrast, Computer and Video Games' Paul Davies was very critical, stating "How Atari have a hope when pitching this kind of rot against Sega Rally, and Wipeout I do not even try to understand."

Electronic Gaming Monthly's two sports reviewers particularly faulted its dull track design. One of them elaborated that "Although the scenery changes, each race is an exercise in repetition: pick up icons, don't hit anything." They did, however, compliment the smoothness of the controls. Game Zero Magazine's Bryan Carter gave positive remarks to the game's audiovisual presentation but panned its handling controls. Marc Abramson of the French ST Magazine lauded the game for its pastel-toned visuals, music, sound effects, controls, and two-player mode. However, Abramson lamented the lack of support with the JagLink and Team Tap peripherals for more players, and criticized the positioning of power-ups on the tracks. Última Generación's Javier S. Fernández compared Atari Karts favorably with both Super Mario Kart and Street Racer by Ubi Soft, noting its character designs and colorful track settings.

Video Games' Jan Schweinitz agreed with Carter regarding the handling. Regardless, Schweinitz wrote that "Even if the vehicle feel of Atari Karts isn't nearly as good as that of the Mario Kart's, so much good stuff has been stolen from Nintendo's classic that even Atari racing is really fun." Fun Generation's Stephan Girlich and Andreas Binzenhöfer praised the graphical presentation and gameplay but felt mixed about the audio. GamePro's Air Hendrix commented that the game was well-made but too simplistic and cutesy to appeal to anyone but young children, concluding, "These races present just the right level of cuteness and challenge for those younger Jaguar gamers. The question, of course, is how many seven-year-olds are out there looking for Jag games?". Next Generation agreed that it was chiefly geared to a younger audience and lacked sophistication, and further criticized that the various tracks are visually different but handle and feel the same. However, they said the game "does have a certain charm that makes it hard to avoid." MAN!AC's Robert Bannert commended the title for its audiovisual presentation, characters, and playability, but felt that the controls were inferior to Mario Kart.

Retrospective commentary for Atari Karts has been equally middling. The Atari Times' Gregory D. George criticized the lack of interesting power-ups and limited AI of computer drivers. Author Andy Slaven regarded Atari Karts as one of the best racing games on the Jaguar. Christian Roth and Nils of the German website neXGam gave the positive remarks to the game's mode 7-style visuals and two-player mode, but its controls and lack of battle mode were seen as negative points.

== Legacy ==
After the release of Atari Karts on the market, Miracle Designs began working on a sequel but never moved forward beyond the planning phase. Merlin Racing, a 2000 racing game created by Miracle Designs and released for Nuon, is considered a spiritual successor to the game. In 2003, Miracle Designs split the game's content across four separate titles released for PlayStation: Rascal Racers, Miracle Space Race, ATV Racers, and XS Airboat Racing. Miracle Designs would later work on titles such as Hooters Road Trip and an adaptation based on the 2003 action comedy film Taxi 3. Hautekeete and Vermeulen would go on to co-found Neopica, the sister studio of Sproing Interactive.
