= Matías Duarte =

Chilean-American computer interface designer

- Born: Matías Gonzalo Duarte Sunkel; 30 January 1973 (age 53); Talca, Chile
- Occupations: Vice President & Google Fellow at Google
- Children: 2

Matías Duarte is a Chilean-American computer interface designer and a Google Fellow, VP at Google. Prior to his current role, he was a Design VP in various capacities, including VP of Material Design and VP of Android User Experience. Android 3.0 "Honeycomb" was the first release with major elements of his design influence.

Prior to moving to Google to work on Android, Duarte had similar roles in Palm, Inc.’s webOS, the Helio Ocean and the Danger Hiptop (T-Mobile Sidekick).

== Career ==
Duarte started his career at Psycroft where he cowrote xBill with Brian Wellington. He left Psycroft in 1996 at which time he moved to Hyper Image Productions where he was the lead designer on Phase Zero, an unreleased shooter game for the Atari Jaguar. In 1997 he left Hyper Image Productions and moved to MagicArts where he filled the role of Vice President of Design until 1999. In March 2000 Duarte took a role at Danger as the Director of Design where his team won the 2002 Wired 'Industrial Designer' Rave Award for their work in designing the Hiptop/SideKick. In August 2005 he took up a role at Helio, as Vice President Experience Design and left shortly before the company was acquired by Virgin Mobile. In September 2007 Duarte was hired as the Vice President at Palm, Inc. to lead development of Palm’s webOS Human Interface and User Experience and introduced the design of webOS at the 2009 Consumer Electronics Show. In May 2010 Duarte was hired by Google as Director for the Android User Experience working on the interface and design for Android 3.0 (AKA Honeycomb).

== Award ==
- 2002 Wired Rave Award, Industrial Designer of the Year "to Matias Duarte, Joe Palmer, and Andy Johnston for their work in designing Danger's hiptop communications device."

== Education ==
Duarte graduated from the Science, Mathematics and Computer Science Magnet Program at Montgomery Blair High School, Silver Spring, Maryland. He earned a Bachelor of Science with Honors from the University of Maryland with a B.S. in Computer Science. He took on additional concentrations of study in Fine Art and Art History, and managed the Student Art Gallery from 1993 to 1996 at the University of Maryland.

== Personal life ==
Duarte is married, and had a daughter in June 2008, another one in 2010.
