= BattleSphere =

2000 video game

- Developer: 4Play
- Publisher: ScatoLOGIC
- Designers: Douglas Engel; Scott Le Grand; Stephanie Wukovitz; Tom Harker
- Programmers: Douglas Engel; Scott Le Grand; Stephanie Wukovitz
- Artist: Douglas Engel
- Composer: Stephanie Wukovitz
- Platform: Atari Jaguar
- Release: WW: February 29, 2000; WW: March 15, 2002 (Gold)
- Genre: Space combat simulation
- Modes: Single-player, multiplayer

BattleSphere is a space combat simulation video game developed by 4Play for the Atari Jaguar. The game was released in 2000, with the enhanced edition BattleSphere Gold released in 2002. Set during a future war between seven alien races, the factions agree to confine their hostilities to a tournament with the galaxy at stake. Gameplay consists of five modes, each featuring distinct scenarios and objectives. Up to 16 players can participate in a deathmatch mode via local area network (LAN) play.

BattleSphere was the first Jaguar title by 4Play, a partnership between Douglas Engel, Scott Le Grand, Stephanie Wukovitz, and Tom Harker. The project was conceptualized in 1993, when Engel and Le Grand decided to pitch a space combat game to Atari Corporation, and suggested developing the concept as an update to Star Raiders (1980). The team decided that it should feature different scenarios for single-player and network multiplayer. They combined aspects of Star Raiders, Doom (1993), and Star Wars: TIE Fighter, with the networking component of Netrek. Production began in 1994, with the partners self-funding the game's development while employed full-time. A PC port was in development, but never entered full production due to lack of interest from publishers.

BattleSphere was published after the Jaguar was declared as an open platform by Hasbro Interactive under the ScatoLOGIC label. ScatoLOGIC was formed by Engel, Le Grand, and Wukovitz following Harker's departure from 4Play to handle all production aspects. The first copy was sold on eBay, and the developers pledged to donate all profits from sales to charity. Gaming publications gave the game generally favorable reviews, praising its graphics, sound, gameplay, multiplayer, and AI. Some reviewers also cited the game's network support. Retrospective commentary in the years following its release have hailed it as one of the best titles for the Jaguar.

== Gameplay and premise ==
BattleSphere is a space combat simulation game played from a first-person perspective, similar to Wing Commander, Star Wars: TIE Fighter, and Descent: FreeSpace. The story is set during a future war between seven alien races. The leaders of each race confine all hostilities to an enclosed region of space formerly used for testing weapons and starships. Each race send their best soldiers and military technology in a tournament to claim control of the galaxy. Gameplay consists of five modes divided into single console or network submenus, each with distinct scenarios and objectives: "Alone Against the Empires" is a single-player scenario in which the player fights enemy armadas across 64 quadrants. "Gauntlet" is an endless mode where the player defends six bases from enemy waves. "Free-For-All" is a deathmatch mode, where victory is awarded to the first player to reach a specific number of kills. "Pilot Training" is a practice mode for novices. "BattleSphere" is a multiplayer network mode where two teams attempt to capture each other's bases.

Internal view of an O'Catanut ship engaging in dogfight with an enemy

There are seven playable races: the demon-esque Oppressors, the all-female Se'Bab, the advanced Telchines, the lizard-like Slith, the humanoid Smg'Heed, the feline O'Catanut, and the hawk-like Thunderbirds. There are also secret races unlockable via cheat codes. For each race, players can select a fighter, bomber, or supership, with unplayable set pieces in the background such as starbases.

The player controls the ship in a 3D environment. The player can maneuver, lock onto targets, and fire weapons. There are six weapon types depending on the game mode and ship: lasers, plasma, virus shots, stasis bolts, mines, and homing missiles. The heads-up display of each ship type shows several functions such as velocity and thrust meters, shield and energy levels, and integrity of its hull. Every ship is also equipped with a missile approach warning system, emitting a noise when enemy missiles are nearby. In "Alone Against the Empires," the player can view a galactic map, which displays a hexagonal grid indicating their location, allied starbases, and enemy ships. The player can also repair the ship by orbiting a friendly starbase, command allied ships, and jump to hyperspace when playing in "Alone Against the Empires".

The game features support for the ProController. A second player can act as a gunner using another controller; one player pilots the ship while the other player aims the reticle and shoot. Two players can play "Gauntlet" mode using JagLink. Up to 16 players can play in "Free-For-All" via local area network (LAN) play using CatBox across 16 consoles. Optional gunners can also participate for a total of 32 players.

== Production ==
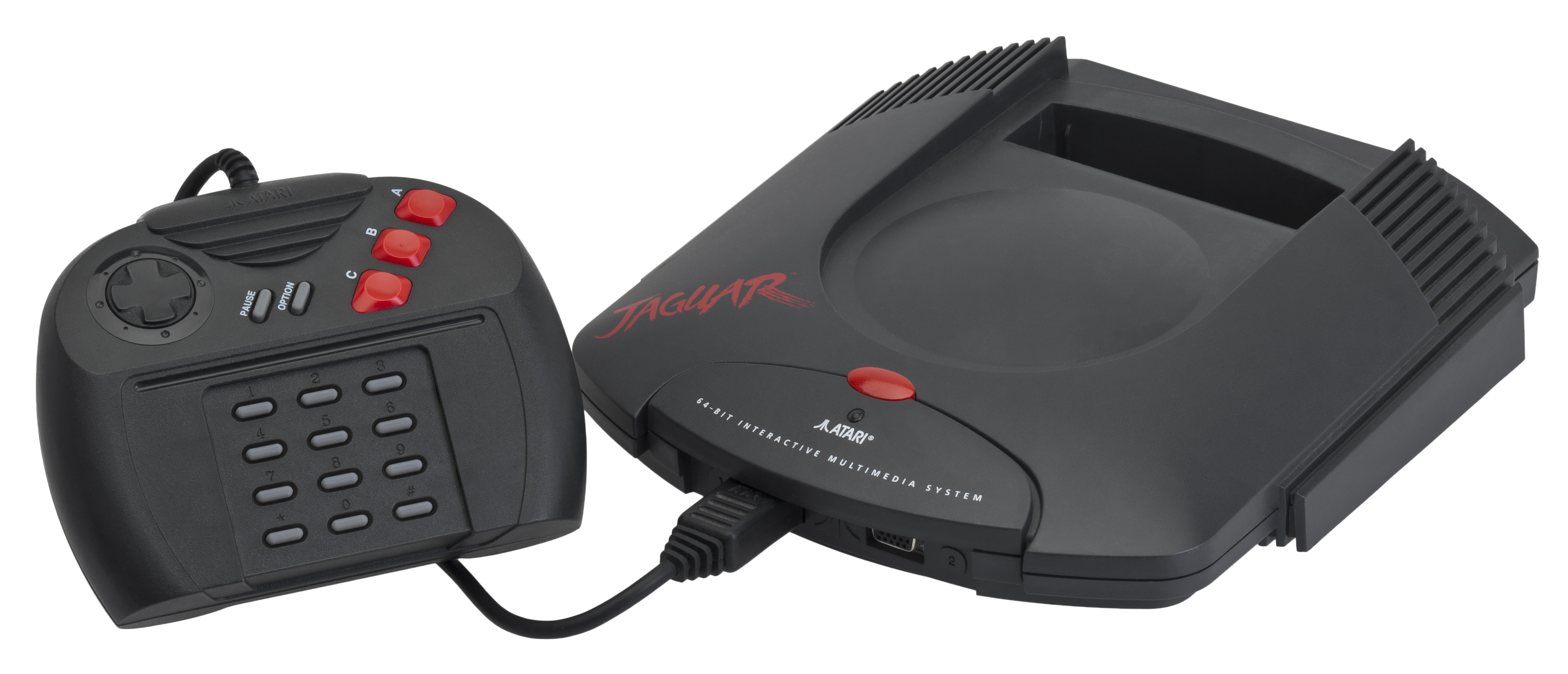
BattleSphere was conceptualized in 1993 and entered production in 1994 but it was not published until 2000, after the Atari Jaguar was declared as an open platform by Hasbro Interactive.

BattleSphere was the first Atari Jaguar title by 4Play (previously Phalanx Software), a team led by Douglas Engel, Scott Le Grand, Stephanie Wukovitz, and Tom Harker. (Note: Attributed to multiple references:) Engel and Le Grand had previously written games for the Atari 8-bit computers such as Rocks! (1987) and Death Run respectively. The four acted as co-designers, with Wukovitz providing music using an audio engine created by Engel, who also provided most of the artwork. Engel, Le Grand, and Wukovitz also served as co-programmers. Harker designed the CatBox peripheral, and provided 4Play with necessary software and hardware components.

BattleSphere uses a polygon rendering engine written by Le Grand, which displays up to 256 objects onscreen. A hardware trick using the Jaguar's Blitter processor was devised to run the game up to 60 frames per second. Texture-mapping is employed for details such as the alien races' symbols and identification numbers in network mode, using a graphical technique dubbed "Decal-Mapping" for all Gouraud-shaded 3D models. The 3D models were created by Engel using the InShape graphic program on Atari Falcon. Wukovitz scored the music using Protracker and a music tracker on PC, citing Babylon 5 as an inspiration. The story sequence uses a fractal animation donated by Damien Jones of Temporary Sanity Designs dubbed "Julia", originally for an Atari 2600 (VCS) Jaguar emulator called Virtual VCS. The Jaguar's hardware is also used for tasks such as handling of AI and physics engine. The network code was written by Engel in six months.

=== Concept ===
Engel and Le Grand created the concept in August 1993, beginning the project as a space combat game. While Le Grand was researching on developing for The 3DO Company's 3DO platform, Atari Corporation unveiled their own console plans with the Jaguar. The team thus sent their 20-page game proposal to both console makers, among other companies. They also posted an online advert expressing interest in Jaguar development. Atari invited the team to a private showing of the Jaguar in September 1993, where Engel and Le Grand pitched the project under the name Singularity. When the team suggested developing the game as an update to Atari's 1980 game Star Raiders, Atari staffer Bill Rehbock responded that the title was reserved for an in-house project. Atari liked the proposal however, becoming interested in signing them as developers under the Phalanx Software name. Engel based the game's concept on Star Wars: X-Wing, but with the story focusing on a black hole. This idea was eventually scrapped, as they could not achieve an accurate depiction of a black hole. Engel and Le Grand brought on board Harker, who reached to them when looking for programmers to produce titles for the Jaguar. Le Grand also convinced Wukovitz to compose music for the game, resulting in 4Play's formation as a partnership.

=== Development ===
Work on the project began in 1994, after 4Play received Jaguar development kits from Atari. The working title changed from Singularity to Star Battle, in honor of a mainframe computer game written by Le Grand during his high school period in the 1980s. The team decided that the game should feature different scenarios for single-player and network multiplayer. 4Play cited Star Raiders, Doom (1993), Star Wars: TIE Fighter, and Iron Soldier as influences for the game. The group combined aspects of each game design with the networking component of Netrek. Since the entire team already had full-time jobs, they began development in their spare time without any outside investment. 4Play estimated the game would be done in 12 or 18 months but faced several issues during production, including lack of support from Atari.

As 4Play shifted to full-time development in July 1995, the game received its final name as BattleSphere. Meanwhile, Atari shelved another space game called Space War 2000 due to a poor reception in focus tests, deciding to shift their focus to BattleSphere due to the demo's positive reception. Atari discontinued the Jaguar in 1996, and the company merged with JTS Corporation. 4Play decided to continue production of the game, focusing on adding multiple game modes. The BattleSphere mode was completed by February 1997, while more features were introduced and gameplay was refined. The team improved their skills as production neared completion, with Engel and Wukovitz implementing changes to the graphics and sound driver. With the help of several volunteers, Engel led the testing process, discovering bugs that were fixed with Le Grand's help.

In March 1998, Hasbro Interactive acquired all of Atari's assets after buying out JTS, approving BattleSphere for binary encryption soon after. However, 4Play didn't receive any approval in writing, leading them to encode the game's ROM image using encryption cracking software, without official hardware support. Harker departed the studio in mid 1998, citing concerns with the project's financial viability, and development concluded in July. Hasbro declared the Jaguar as an open platform in 1999, releasing the console's patents and rights into public domain after much lobbying from Atari fans, allowing software developers to make and release games for it without a licensing agreement. Le Grand criticized Atari's handling of the Jaguar, but stated he enjoyed working with the hardware and found it easier to program for compared to Sega Saturn.

== Release ==
The game was first revealed at the 1994 Summer Consumer Electronics Show, planning for a Christmas release date under the title Star Battle. More details were showcased at additional tradeshows, revealing additional gameplay at ToadFest '94, the BattleSphere title at the 1995 Winter CES, and network play at E3 1995. It made appearances at other events such as the 1995 MiST Atari festival, and the 1998 World of Atari show. The game garnered positive response from atendees at E3 1995 and the 1995 Super Tour hosted by Electronic Gaming Monthly. It was featured at JagFest '97, a show dedicated to the Atari Jaguar scene, and was subsequently shown at JagFest '98 and JagFest '99. In 1999, composer Stephanie Wukovitz released music tracks from the game at MP3.com as part of an album titled The Original BS.

BattleSphere received favorable commentary from gaming publications prior to launch, and became an anticipated title for the Jaguar. Leading up to release, VideoGames magazine noted it as a "respectful tribute" to space combat games. Intelligent Gamer's Fusion expressed excitement over the game's audiovisuals and network play. This was echoed by Next Generation, who hailed it as one of the best Jaguar games, while lamenting that "it's too bad that the game will not receive the large audience it deserves".

BattleSphere was released on February 29, 2000, published by 4Play under the label ScatoLOGIC, a production and publishing entity formed by Wukovitz, Engel, and Le Grand following Harker's departure. The first copy of BattleSphere signed by the authors was sold on eBay, and the developers pledged to donate all profits from sales to diabetes research. Concealed within the game is JUGS, (Note: Acronym for the Jaguar Unmodified Game Server) a development system which allow users to create and load software for the Jaguar via PC.

An enhanced edition called BattleSphere Gold was released on March 15, 2002, offering new visuals, as well as bug fixes and compatibility improvements. In 2003, ScatoLOGIC released an unofficial peripheral called ScatBox, which enabled LAN play in both BattleSphere and Gold edition with more than two Jaguar consoles. In 2006, a one-of-a-kind edition called BattleSphere Trio was auctioned on eBay. The Trio edition features both versions of BattleSphere as well as the JUGS development system. 4Play expressed interest licensing the game to third parties, or porting the game to PCs and consoles. They began development on a PC port, but never entered full production due to lack of interest from publishers.

== Reception ==
Reception

Review scores
Publication	Score
The Atari Times	95%
Jaguar Front Page News	9/10
neXGam	9.2/10

Upon its release in February 2000, BattleSphere was met with generally favorable reception from reviewers. GameFan's Eric Mylonas praised the networked multiplayer as its strongest feature, while also highlighting the game's soundscapes and gouraud-shaded graphics. The Atari Times' Gregory D. George also praised the game's audiovisual presentation, as well as its fast-paced action and intelligent enemy ships. Mike Dolce of Jaguar Front Page News (a part of the GameSpy network) praised the game's overall graphics, Wukovitz's soundtrack, and gameplay for making the most of the Jaguar controller, but felt the plot was its weakest aspect. Author Andy Slaven wrote that "It's too bad the early Jaguar games didn't look and play like this one". The game is considered by gaming journalists as one of the rarest, most valuable and sought-after Jaguar titles; it became a rare collector's item that fares high prices on the secondary collecting market, due to being produced under a very limited run of copies since the components necessary to manufacture cartridges were scarce.

In the years after its release, reviewers have celebrated BattleSphere as one of the Jaguar's best and most desired games. In a 2002 retro gaming feature, Edge called it "one of the most desirable games of all time" due to its small production, created by a small team with a "bedroom coding ethic". Reviewing the game in 2007, nexGam praised the ship designs and multiplayer mode, while criticizing some issues with network support. GamesTM regarded the game as a "desirable prospect" for any Atari collector, stating that it pushed the Jaguar further than other titles during the system's commercial lifespan. They added that the mix of action and strategy in a 3D arena, and particularly the multiplayer options, made the game stand out. Retro Gamer named it one of the ten best games for Jaguar, noting its visuals, dynamic AI, network multiplayer, and references to popular sci-fi franchises. 1Up.com included the game as one of "31 Homebrew Games Worth Playing", labelling it as the most high profile title from the Jaguar's homebrew scene. Lamenting its limited release, HobbyConsolas identified it as one of the twenty best games for the Jaguar. In 2023, Time Extension also listed BattleSphere as one of the best games on Jaguar.
