= SuperKarts =

1995 video game

- Developer: Manic Media
- Publishers: PAL: Virgin Interactive Entertainment; NA: Williams Entertainment
- Platform: MS-DOS
- Release: 1995
- Genre: Racing

SuperKarts is a kart racing video game developed for MS-DOS by Manic Media in 1995.

== Plot ==
The player plays as characters from different countries and races on circuits from those characters' home countries.

- Kevin Moore United States
- Charlie Smith UK
- Klaus Krugel Germany
- Aki Sun Japan
- Katie Clark Australia
- Luis Sanchez Brazil
- Mustapha Gee India
- Ivan Zoomski Russia

== Tracks ==
Every driver has a home track according to the country of origin. Each of these tracks has two variants. This means that the game features 16 race tracks and one bonus track

- United States - Los Angeles: Sandy track, sunny weather.
- UK - London: Asphalt track, cloudy weather.
- Germany - Berlin: Covered with factory metal pipes and asphalt, driven in darkness.
- Japan - Tokyo: The tracks resembles a huge digital screen, driven at night.
- Australia - Ayers Rock: Mainly clay surface, the track is partly disturbed by large pools of water.
- Brazil - São Paulo: Mainly grass surface, partly sand and wood, rainy weather.
- India - Delhi: The surface changes between grass, sand and water, bright weather.
- Russia - Moscow: The surface changes between cobbles stones, ice and snow, snowy weather.

Bonus track:

- Indonesia - Krakatau: The surface changes between mainly stones, partly there's a viscous substance, maybe lava, the skies are crimson as lava.

== Development ==
The game was developed by Manic Media Productions, a company based in Oxford, England .

== Reception ==
In the United Kingdom, the game topped the monthly all-formats sales chart in April 1995. Computer and Video Games said it is a Super Mario Kart lookalike that is "not as good as that seminal piece of software, but damn good fun with up to eight players on a network." Next Generation gave the game four stars out of five, and stated that "SuperKarts offers a perfect blend of strategy and arcade action."

== Reviews ==
- Pelit (Jun, 1995)
- Electric Playground (Nov 17, 1995)
- Coming Soon Magazine (Jul 25, 1995)
- PC Team (Apr, 1995)
- Imperium Gier (Oct 10, 1998)
