= Black Out! =

2012 video game

- Developer: Stormworks Interactive
- Publisher: Stormworks Interactive
- Programmer: Jeff Nihlean
- Artist: Shawn Lavery
- Composer: Chris Mylrae
- Platforms: Atari Jaguar, Atari Jaguar CD
- Release: July 9, 2012 (Jaguar); August 13, 2012 (Jaguar CD)
- Genre: Puzzle
- Mode: Single-player

Black Out! is a 2012 puzzle homebrew video game developed and published by Stormworks Interactive for the Atari Jaguar and Atari Jaguar CD. It is the first and only title shipped currently by Stormworks Interactive. In the game, the player must turn off all the light bulbs in a 3x3 grid pattern with the lowest amount of moves possible across four stages comprising ten levels each. The player also has a pre-set move limit and a fixed time limit to solve the puzzle efficiently depending on the difficulty setting.

Stormworks Interactive, one of the few independent developers committed to Jaguar at the time after Hasbro Interactive released the console's patents and rights into public domain, had previously announced and worked on various homebrew projects that were never finished but served as learning exercises in order to program for Jaguar. Black Out! started development in 2009 but was shelved despite the engine and rules being completed until production resumed in 2011, with Stormworks Interactive rewriting the game while also fixing bugs and additional artwork.

== Gameplay ==
Gameplay screenshot of the first stage, Toxicity

Black Out! is a grid-based puzzle game reminiscent of Tiger Electronics' Lights Out and Parker Brothers' Magic Square from the Merlin handheld electronic game, where the main objective of the player is to turn off all the light bulbs in a 3x3 grid with the lowest amount of moves possible. There are ten levels across four stages in total, each one presenting a set light pattern that must be solved to advance into the next level. Depending on the difficulty setting, the player has a pre-set move limit and a fixed time limit to solve the puzzle efficiently.

The player is awarded with two items (a time freezer and a bomb) when several levels are cleared in a row without failing and at a quick pace, which can be used to solve puzzles. The game has no pause feature and if the player press the pause button during gameplay, the game will mock them for attempting to do so. Failing to solve any puzzle will send the player back to the starting level of a stage after using a limited number of continues, and the game is over after running out of continues. Finishing the game on the highest difficulty setting unlocks an extra stage at the main menu, which features new puzzles to solve for the player.

== Development and release ==
Black Out! was created by Stormworks Interactive, a small Texas-based game developer. They were one of the few independent developers committed to Atari Jaguar, at the time after Hasbro Interactive released the console's patents and rights into public domain in 1999. Stormworks Interactive had previously announced and worked on various homebrew projects such as Arkanna (a Myst-style graphic adventure) and Zero (a shoot 'em up), neither of which were ever finished but served as learning exercises in order to program for Jaguar. The game was solely programmed by Jeff Nihlean, while Shawn Lavery created the graphics and sound effects. The soundtrack was composed by Chris Mylrae under the pseudonym "-cTrix", and the game's cover art was illustrated by Emily Sheldon, among other staff members assisting in the production.

Development started in 2009 but was shelved despite the game's engine and rules being already complete until production was resumed in 2011, with Stormworks Interactive rewriting it while also fixing bugs and additional artwork. Black Out! was released for Jaguar under a very limited run on July 9, 2012, complete with packaging mimicking officially licensed Jaguar releases, however the initial batch of cartridges do not work correctly on PAL consoles. An Atari Jaguar CD version was also released on August 13, while the game's ROM image was released online for free. It received coverage from gaming outlets like VentureBeat and Retro Gamer for being on a platform deemed as a commercial failure.

== Reception and legacy ==
Kieren Hawken writing in Retro Video Gamer reviewed the Atari Jaguar CD release. Hawken found the game to be fun and compared it with the electronic game Lights Out (1995) by Tiger Electronics. He also praised its soundtrack, presentation, graphical style, and difficulty curve, regarding Black Out! as a "great addition to the homebrew library of the Jaguar."

Black Out! is currently the only title completed and shipped by Stormworks Interactive, and formed part in a string of projects under development by the group for Jaguar such as homebrew conversions of the Freedoom project (retitled as Doom+), Heretic (1994), Chex Quest (1996), among others games.
