= Caves of Fear =

- Splash screen
- Developer: Atari Corporation
- Publishers: Original release: NA/EU: Atari Corporation; Relaunch: WW: B&C Computervisions
- Producer: David M. Schwartz
- Engine: GameFilm
- Platform: Atari Jaguar CD
- Release: Original release: NA/EU: Unreleased; Relaunch: WW: August 2002
- Genre: Interactive movie
- Mode: Single-player

Caves of Fear is an unreleased interactive movie video game developed by Atari Corporation in 1995 exclusively for the Atari Jaguar CD. It served as technology demonstration of the GameFilm, a then-newly developed in-house interactive movie format conceived by former Atari Corp. employee David Schwartz during his time at the company.

Set in Montevideo, Uruguay in 1996, players assume the role of CIA agent Jack Armstrong tasked with stopping the terrorist organization World White Order before their chemical weapon is released into the world and "purifies" all of humanity. The players interact with the demo by performing actions highlighted with text messages appearing at the bottom of the screen, along with a subliminal voice in the background that queues to their possible decisions which can affect the narrative such as the getting the main character killed, and certain actions may lead to alternative scenes and endings.

Despite Caves of Fear never being intended to be officially released into the public by Atari, a playable prototype build of the game was eventually recovered from being destroyed by Atari historian and video game collector Glenn Bruner along with a colleague. It has since been released and sold online by independent groups such as B&C Computervisions.

== Gameplay ==
Gameplay screenshot.

Caves of Fear is an interactive movie game demo that uses full motion video (FMV) to present the story and gameplay, similar to Digital Pictures' Sewer Shark and Netflix's Black Mirror: Bandersnatch, where players are instructed by the in-game text messages or a subliminal voice heard on the background to make CIA agent Jack Armstrong perform a choice under quick time events by pressing the A button on the controller, which can alter the course of the narrative and create a branching storyline, leading to different outcomes on each playthrough such as having the main character killed by World White Order agents. Due to its use of the GameFilm technology, scenes play and alter between each other without visible pausing, streamlining the experience and giving them a smooth narrative flow as a result, unlike most FMV titles released at the time. After reaching the end, players are ranked depending on their decisions and scoring is also based upon their actions.

== History ==
Caves of Fear served as a demonstration of the then-newly developed in-house interactive movie format conceived by former Atari employee David M. Schwartz named GameFilm, which allowed for data arranged in clips representing video film having multiple segments, matching another one to make them splice seamlessly when played in series as a result. According to Atari Explorer Online's Jim Marsteller, the project was only showcased to key attendees at E3 1995. Internal documents from Atari also revealed that several production houses were involved in the creation of the project such as Man Made Films, The Music Annex, Apple & Honey Film, and Rimon.

== Release ==
Sometime in the 2000s, a playable prototype build of the game was found and recovered by Atari historian and video game collector Glenn Bruner along with an anonymous colleague from being destroyed, with homebrew programmer Scott Walters writing a CD booting program to run the title. After being rediscovered, it was showcased across fan festivals such as E-JagFest 2001 burned on a CD-R, in addition of being sold at Classic Gaming Expo 2002 by B&C Computervisions including a case and a professionally printed CD for US$25. It has since been leaked online and can be played by either using a Jaguar CD Bypass cartridge from B&C Computervisions or other methods of running unencrypted CD-Rs, as the game was not encrypted to run on standard Jaguar CD systems.
