= Atari Age =

Magazine published by a subsidiary of Atari

- Editor: Steve Morgenstern
- Categories: Video game
- Frequency: Bi-Monthly
- First issue: May/June 1982; 44 years ago
- Final issue Number: March/April 1984; 11
- Company: The Atari Club
- Country: United States
- Based in: Philadelphia, Pennsylvania, U.S.
- Language: English
- ISSN: 0731-5686

Atari Age was a magazine distributed to Atari Club members from 1982 until 1984. It was published by The Atari Club, a subsidiary of Atari, Inc.. The magazine only covered Atari products and events, offering exclusive deals to its readers, and serving as an advertising and merchandise outlet for the company. Atari used the magazine to build brand loyalty, promoting Atari products in a non-objective manner. The magazine was based in Philadelphia.

== History ==
Created in 1982, Atari Age was given to Atari Club members as a perk for joining the club. Upon paying the US$1 club membership fee, the member would also receive a year's subscription to Atari Age. The magazine regularly featured content related to all things Atari. This included coverage of Atari-related news, coverage of Atari-related events, exclusive looks at new products from Atari, technical articles, exclusive offers to Atari Club members and a catalog of Atari-related merchandise and paraphernalia.

The first issue of the magazine was May/June 1982, with design director Tony Prizzi and Atari Club director Parker Jerrell.

Atari Age ceased publication in 1984, after Warner Communications sold the consumer division of Atari to Jack Tramiel, the founder of Commodore International, who focused his efforts on the newly renamed Atari Corporation's personal computers in order to compete with his old company.
