= Hyper Force =

2000 video game

- Cover art by Tony Ferguson
- Developer: Visual Impact
- Publisher: Songbird Productions
- Designers: David Govaert; Thomas Vidts
- Programmers: Claude Verstraeten; Kris Van Lier
- Artists: Kurt Huyghe; Tom Willemkens
- Composers: Kurt Drubbel; Steve Lankaore
- Platform: Atari Jaguar
- Release: WW: April 10, 2000
- Genres: Action, platform
- Mode: Single-player

Hyper Force is a 2000 action-platform video game developed by Visual Impact for the Atari Jaguar. Set in 2099, the game puts the player in the role of a lone soldier in the Interstellar Special Forces tasked with eliminating the Trans Con organization. The player must fight enemies, overcome various obstacles, and reach the exit through the levels, while collecting money to purchase items for their character in a shop.

Hyper Force was co-programmed by Visual Impact founders Kris Van Lier and Claude Verstraeten. It was first announced in 1994 and subsequently showcased at E3 1995, with Computer West as the publisher. In 1996, Atari ceased support and canceled all projects for the Jaguar, leaving the game unreleased. After Atari dropped support for the Jaguar, a programmer named Carl Forhan obtained the rights to publish it from Visual Impact. Hasbro Interactive later made the Jaguar an open platform, allowing Forhan to release the game under his studio Songbird Productions.

Hyper Force received a mixed reception; the audiovisual presentation, gameplay, and controls were praised, but some reviewers were divided regarding the character sprites, while criticism was directed at the level design and the game's save system.

== Gameplay ==
The Interstellar Special Forces (ISF) soldier shoots an enemy in the Trans Con mines, the first area in Hyper Force

Hyper Force is an action-platform game similar to the Turrican series. The story takes place in the year 2099, where humanity has expanded across the stars thanks to technological advances that allow for rapid interstellar travel. However, megacorporations have an insatiable desire for expansion, with Trans Con being the most ruthless organization, having decimated planets and amassed enough resources to break free from restrictions of the Terran High Command. Fearing the loss of corporate support, politicians have turned a blind eye to these atrocities threatening the galaxy. A lone soldier from the Interstellar Special Forces (ISF) is tasked with eliminating Trans Con.

The player takes on the role of the soldier facing Trans Con, fighting enemies and overcoming various obstacles throughout the levels. The player character can move in any direction, look up or down, perform a hover jump, climb ropes, and fire their weapon. In each level, the player collects money, weapon ammo, and items to earn more points. The player must also find an exit sign to advance to the next level. The game features over twenty levels, set in locations such as mines, a city, a fortress, and a laboratory. In later levels, the player must find switches that open security barriers to reach the exit. To find any of the switches, the player must explore hidden areas and fake ceilings, or shoot blocks to uncover passageways.

At the end of each level, the money collected during gameplay can be spent at the ISF supply shop to buy items. These include weapon upgrades, extra ammo, health replenishment, and extra lives. There are four weapons available, including a laser pistol, a scatter gun, and a flamethrower. However, the player cannot purchase ammo for a particular weapon without first owning it. Weapon upgrades can be selected at any time and will last as long as the player has their current life, but will need to be purchased again when restarting the level after losing a life. By pausing the game and accessing the options menu, the player can select one of the three available save slots to resume progress later.

== Development and release ==
Hyper Force was the first Atari Jaguar title by Visual Impact, a Ghent-based development company founded in 1994 by Kris Van Lier and Claude Verstraeten. Van Lier and Verstraeten participated in the game's creation as co-programmers. David Govaert and Thomas Vidts acted as co-level designers, while Kurt Huyghe and Tom Willemkens were responsible for the artwork. The music was composed by Kurt Drubbel and Steve Lankaore. The game was formally announced in 1994 and was later showcased at Atari's booth at E3 1995. Its release was planned for the third quarter of 1995 by Computer West (C-West), which had published Cannon Fodder and Pinball Fantasies for the Jaguar. In 1996, Atari dropped support and canceled all projects for the Jaguar, which meant the game would not be released. Visual Impact was also working on a second Jaguar title, inspired by Doom and scheduled for release in 1995, but it did not come out either due to the Jaguar's demise.

Years later, a programmer named Carl Forhan began searching for unreleased Jaguar games that he might license and finish on his own. Forhan managed to obtain the rights to publish Hyper Force, but since Visual Impact did not provide him with the source code, he had to release the ROM image as he received it. In 1999, Forhan founded Songbird Productions to publish the game and other unreleased titles he had licensed from former Atari developers. That same year, Atari fans successfully lobbied Hasbro Interactive to release the console's patents and rights into the public domain, transforming the Jaguar into an open game development platform. Video footage of the game was shown at JagFest '99, an event focused on the Jaguar, and its release was initially planned for March 20, 2000. However, delays in cartridge manufacturing postponed the release date to April 10, 2000. Songbird Productions modelled the game's packaging after official Jaguar releases. The cover art was created by Tony Ferguson.

== Reception ==
Reception

Review scores
Publication	Score
Video Games (DE)	2/5
Atari Entertainment	90%
The Atari Times	73%
neXGam	7/10

Hyper Force received mixed reviews. Video Games' Ralph Karels labelled it as a mediocre title, stating that its graphics and sprite animations could not compete with the best Sega Mega Drive games. GameFan's Eric Mylonas considered it a decent game, highlighting its detailed backgrounds and frenetic action, but opined that, while the visuals were solid, the color palette was somewhat dark and the sprites could have had more animation frames. Atari Entertainment praised the colorful graphics and soundtrack, but noted that the backgrounds were repetitive and the game was too easy. In his review for Jaguar Front Page News (a part of the GameSpy network), Dan Loosen felt the game had a good pace, with elements of both puzzle-solving and platforming. Loosen noted that the player character was not as well animated as the enemies and that the large size of the sprites made them difficult to dodge. He also found the controls too sensitive at first before getting used to them.

Author Andy Slaven wrote that "While not nearly up to the level of the superlative Rayman, this sci-fi side-scroller certainly has some moments of greatness". He commended the game's controls and sound effects, but remarked that the visuals could have been more polished. The Atari Times' David Sherwin commended its enjoyable gameplay and adequate controls. He stated that the graphics were well done, but felt the character sprites were too large for the play area, and that the soundscape was pleasant but unremarkable. Sherwin also criticized the game's save system for being clunky and buggy. In its 2009 review, neXGam gave the game positive remarks for its pleasing visuals, enjoyable gameplay, fair difficulty, and weapon shop system, but the poor sound effects and awkward level design were seen as negative points. Retro Gamer proclaimed that Hyper Force was the type of game that the Atari Jaguar lacked during its commercial life, and highlighted its large sprites and vibrant music.
