= AirCars =

1997 video game

- Developer: MidNite Entertainment Group
- Publisher: ICD
- Platform: Atari Jaguar
- Release: NA: June 18, 1997
- Genre: Shooter
- Modes: Single-player, multiplayer

AirCars is a 1997 shooter video game developed by MidNite Entertainment Group and published by ICD for the Atari Jaguar. Set in a post-apocalyptic world, the player pilots a hovercraft to fight the E.B.N.E.R.S. organization and stop their plans for world domination. The player is tasked with destroying key targets while fighting enemies and bosses in multiple missions. Two players can play in a co-operative campaign, or up to eight players can participate in a deathmatch mode via local area network (LAN).

AirCars is the first game compatible with CatBox, a peripheral designed by Tom Harker of ICD/Black Cat Design that allowed LAN play with other Jaguar consoles. MidNite initially cancelled the title at the last minute due to an indifferent press response and the company facing financial difficulties, leaving it unreleased despite being finished. ICD acquired the rights and published the game in a limited print run.

AirCars received generally unfavorable reception from critics. Most highlighted the networked multiplayer, but the setup required before playing was considered a disadvantage, and others were mixed regarding the controls. Some reviewers also criticized the polygonal visuals and soundscapes. Retrospective commentators have called it the worst shooter on the Jaguar. In 2010, a version submitted to the ESRB for review, containing several differences compared to the original, was discovered and released.

== Gameplay and premise ==
The player's aircar destroying a base installation before engaging in combat with an enemy tank in the first mission of AirCars

AirCars is a three-dimensional shooter game played from a first-person perspective, similar to Spectre (1991), Cybermorph, and Hover Strike. The plot takes place in a post-apocalyptic world after a nuclear holocaust. An organization called E.B.N.E.R.S. was created, whose aim was to encourage humanity to live in peace and restructure society to eradicate any hostility. The government placed spies within the organization to follow its activities, learning about the development of force fields, teleportation devices, and armored vehicles called aircars. Government spies also revealed E.B.N.E.R.S.' plan to dominate the world by using their weapons and technology to bring the remaining humans under their rule. The player is tasked with eliminating the organization by piloting a prototype aircar, which is teleported to an E.B.N.E.R.S. base complex.

The main objective of the game is to destroy key targets within each complex, such as strategic facilities and enemy vehicles. The player controls the aircar in environments with enemies defending the facilities. The player can maneuver, strafe, switch between camera angles, and fire weapons. There are power-ups to improve or refill the vehicle's weaponry: a shotgun, a machine gun, cannons, a missile launcher, a radar jammer, mines, and a smoke screen. Weapons can be changed on the left or right side of the aircar. There are also two power-up types: one is used immediately, but some have an effect for a limited time when collected, and the other is saved for later use. The dashboard and heads-up display of the aircar show various functions, such as an arrow pointing in the direction of a target, a radar map, as well as speed and armor indicators.

After eliminating each key target, the player must exit the base complex through a teleportation gate and continue to the next area. There are 32 missions in total, each divided into 28 missions on the Earth and 4 missions on Mars. In each mission with the letter G, the player must fight a boss after the last key target is eliminated before moving on to the next area. The game features unlimited continues; If the aircar is destroyed, the player is immediately sent to a new unit and respawns at a random point in the area. Some missions have teleporters that warps the player from one map location to another depending on their color. Two players can play in a co-operative campaign using JagLink, or up to eight players can participate in a deathmatch mode via local area network (LAN) using CatBox.

== Development and release ==
AirCars was developed by the American company MidNite Entertainment Group (previously MidNite Software), one of the initial third-party developers for the Atari Jaguar. MidNite had previously worked on titles such as Food Fight and Airball for Atari 8-bit computers, an adaptation based on the 1988 dark fantasy drama film Willow for Atari ST, as well as Hard Drivin' and Ninja Gaiden III: The Ancient Ship of Doom for Atari Lynx. It is the first game compatible with CatBox, a peripheral designed by Tom Harker of ICD/Black Cat Design that allowed local area network (LAN) play with other Jaguar consoles. The game was first announced at the 1994 Winter Consumer Electronics Show under the name Car Wars, while CatBox was scheduled to be released in the second quarter of 1994. It was shown alongside CatBox at ToadFest '94 under its final title, AirCars, and planned for release on January 30, 1995.

The game was present at the 1995 Winter CES, but received a poor response, and its launch was delayed until April 1995, while Telegames planned a European release. It later appeared in an almost complete state at E3 1995 and was scheduled for release in July 1995, while Harker demonstrated CatBox alongside BattleSphere. Although CatBox was released, MidNite pulled AirCars at the last minute due to an indifferent press response and the company facing financial difficulties, leaving it unreleased despite being finished and passing certification. In 1996, the game's trademark was abandoned. ICD acquired the rights to the game and published it on June 18, 1997, as a limited run of 200 copies. It was also distributed by La Terre du Milieu in France. Each copy came in a cartridge with a full-color label and a manual wrapped in an insert with no outer box. Due to its very limited print run, copies of the game are sought after by collectors and command high prices on the secondary game collecting market.

In 2003, B&C ComputerVisions, a California-based company founded by Bruce and Cathy Carso in 1979, acquired the rights to several ICD products, including AirCars, and released reproduction copies without a box or manual. In 2010, AtariAge user Gary Taylor released an early prototype under the name AirCars '94, complete with packaging mimicking officially licensed Jaguar releases. That same year, the group Team Jaguar discovered a version which was submitted to the ESRB for evaluation, called KA AirCars, releasing a limited run of 100 copies packaged in a clamshell case in conjunction with B&C ComputerVisions. It contains several differences compared to the original release, such as a redesigned dashboard and explosion animations with debris that can damage the player at close range. In 2016, a second print run of KA AirCars was released by Beta Phase Games.

== Reception ==
Reception

Review scores
| Publication | Score |
|---|---|
| Electronic Gaming Monthly | 3.5/10 (Note: Electronic Gaming Monthly's review was by four critics with different ratings out of 10: 4, 4, 3, and 3.) |
| Game Informer | 1/10 |
| Game Players | 48% |
| Next Generation | 3/5 |
| Video Games (DE) | 52% (Note: Video Games (DE) provided scores of 52% for single-player and 80% for multiplayer.) |
| Jaguar Explorer Online | 2.5/5 |
| Ultimate Future Games | 19% |
| VideoGames | 3/10 |

AirCars was met with generally unfavorable reviews. Electronic Gaming Monthly's four reviewers panned the game's primitive visuals, lack of in-game music, limited action, and unrefined controls, but felt that the multiplayer component was its only redeeming quality. Video Games' Robert Zengerle found the graphics very poor and the audio barely acceptable, but compared its gameplay favorably to Starglider and highlighted the networked multiplayer. VideoGames lambasted the game's overall audiovisual presentation and found it unbearable to play, stating that "even the multi-player link capabilities aren't enough to save it".

Game Players' Patrick Baggatta criticized the game's polygonal graphics for its monochrome landscapes, minimalist but generic music, and unsophisticated gameplay. Baggatta made positive comments about its multiplayer networking feature, but saw the hardware requirements as a negative aspect. Next Generation noted the semi-realistic feel of the hovercraft's movement, but found the environment needed for multiplayer to be a disadvantage and faulted the game's simplistic visuals. Ultimate Future Games were dismayed by the graphics and compared it unfavorably to Cybermorph. GamePro's Tommy Glide criticized the visuals due to the sparse environment and bland enemies, but felt that its good controls made it bearable.

Writing for Atari Gaming Headquarters, Carl Forhan regarded AirCars to be a fun title in its genre and praised its controls, weapon variety, enemy AI, and networked multiplayer functionality, but saw the sporadic missions, difficulty, minimal texture mapping in its visuals and repetitive sound effects as negative points. Pascal Berrocal of French ST Magazine commended the game's lack of slowdown, sound effects, and multiplayer mode, but criticized its simple graphics and music department. Writer Seanbaby placed it as number 13 in his "20 worst games ever" feature, while author Andy Slaven regarded it as the worst shooter on the Atari Jaguar. Reviewing the game in 2009, neXGam commented positively on the networked multiplayer, but criticized its dull polygonal environments, limited soundscapes and sluggish controls.

== Legacy ==
AirCars was one of three projects by MidNite Entertainment Group planned for the Atari Jaguar, but was the only one to be released. The others were Dungeon Depths (an action role-playing game), which was intended to be compatible with CatBox for multiplayer, and Assault (a strategy game). Both titles were announced in 1994 and scheduled for release in the second quarter of 1995, but neither was released.
