= Midwest Gaming Classic =

Video game trade show in Wisconsin

- Status: Active
- Genre: Video gaming
- Venue: Wisconsin Center
- Location: Milwaukee, Wisconsin
- Country: United States
- Inaugurated: June 30, 2001
- Attendance: 24,000+ (2023)
- Website: http://www.midwestgamingclassic.com/

The Midwest Gaming Classic (MGC) is an annual trade show open to the general public celebrating all forms of gaming, including video games, arcade games, pinball, TTRPG, Tabletop board games, trading and collectible card games with a focus on retro gaming.

The event has been held in several locations in Wisconsin since launching in 2001.

== History ==
The event that became the Midwest Gaming Classic was first held on June 30, 2001 as Jagfest 2K1. It was the 5th US show titled Jagfest dedicated to the ongoing fan base and homebrew scene of the Atari Jaguar. In 2001, the show organizers decided to open it to all consoles in an effort to expand attendance and be more inclusive. The show expanded to include a museum area, and started a tradition of having consoles and computers on display playable by show attendees, as well as gaming competitions held on multiple platforms. That first year had 15 tables and 20 games available to play. By 2015, it had grown to over 1,000 playable games. As the event has grown the venue has changed to accommodate its size, and its continued evolution to include more types of games like pinball (2002), arcade games (2003), board games (2011), claw crane games (2015), air hockey (2018) Magic: The Gathering (2019), and LARP and foam weapons (2023).

== Events ==
The Midwest Gaming Classic had a focus on retro gaming, but has grown to cover modern game systems as well. The devices on display range from the newest gaming devices to some of the oldest, such as the original Pong. The event also attracts video game champions from the past. The event is known for its pinball games, gaming museum and modern game tournaments. It also has a display of gaming systems that never had success due to a superior competitor or change in technology. Nearly all game systems on display can be played by attendees.

== Growth History ==
Date	Location	Attendance	Notes
2001	PieperPower Center, Milwaukee, WI	< 100	MGC began as JagFest 2k1.
2002	PieperPower Center, Milwaukee, WI	100+	It was rebranded as Midwest Classic a name it retained for another year.
2003	Nicolet High School, Glendale, WI	200	Changed Venue.
2004	Brookfield Sheraton, Brookfield, WI	1,500	The show was rebranded as Midwest Gaming Classic. The venue was once again changed.
2006	The Olympia, Oconomowoc, WI	1,600	The show was rebranded as Midwest Gaming Classic. The venue was once again changed.
2010	Brookfield Sheraton, Brookfield, WI	4,200	The show was rebranded as Midwest Gaming Classic. Venue changed again.
2018	Wisconsin Center, Milwaukee, WI	15,000	The show moved to the largest convention venue in the state and doubled in size.
2022	Wisconsin Center, Milwaukee, WI	20,000	
2023	Wisconsin Center, Milwaukee, WI	24,000	
