= AtariAge =

Video game database

- Former name: Atari 2600 Nexus (1998–2001)
- Website type: Online database on classic Atari video games
- Available in: English
- Owner: Atari SA
- Creators: Albert Yarusso; Alex Bilstein
- Website: www.atariage.com
- Commercial: Yes
- Registration: Optional
- Launched: May 1998; 28 years ago
- Current status: Online

AtariAge is a website focusing on classic Atari video games. The site features gaming news, historical archives, discussion forums, and an online store. It was founded in 1998.

Taking its name from the 1982–84 Atari Age magazine, the site also houses a comprehensive, searchable database of Atari video games, including manuals, packaging art, estimated rarity, screenshots, reviews, and other details, as well as an Atari Age magazine archive. The site is also home to a community of homebrew developers for Atari and other classic video game systems. Some of the homebrew games originally published by AtariAge have been included in official video game compilations such as Activision Anthology.

AtariAge was acquired by Atari SA in September 2023. The site will remain under control of its co-founder Albert Yarusso and his support team.
