= Classic Gaming Expo =

Gaming convention

- Status: Inactive
- Genre: Video games
- Location: Las Vegas
- Country: United States
- Inaugurated: August 14, 1999; 27 years ago
- Most recent: September 12, 2014

Classic Gaming Expo was a gaming convention dedicated to the people, systems and games of the past, with an emphasis on old video games. The Expo was founded in 1999 by John Hardie, Sean Kelly and Keita Iida, In 2000, Joe Santulli replaced Iida as the show's co-organizer.

The conventions have typically been held in the Las Vegas Valley, Nevada, but have sometimes been held in Silicon Valley. One of the focus areas were visits and panels by industry alumni such as Ralph H. Baer and Nolan Bushnell.

In addition to the expo, Kelly, Hardie and Santulli founded the Videogame History Museum, a traveling museum of classic video games and equipment that is on display at events like E3 (Electronic Entertainment Expo) and GDC (Game Developers Conference). In April 2016, the traveling museum celebrated the building of a permanent facility known as the National Videogame Museum in Frisco, Texas. Currently, as of May 2020, Hardie is the resident curator.

== History ==
In October 1995, videogame collectors Hardie, Iida and Mike Etler, founded North Atlantic Videogame Aficionados (NAVA) at Video Game Connections, Etler's videogame store in Howell, New Jersey. The purpose of the quarterly event was to provide a meeting place where videogamers could meet and discuss videogame collecting as well as a place to buy, sell and trade games. The group was a hit and attracted collectors from all around the north east from Canada to South Carolina.

In 1998, Hardie and Iida decided to make NAVA national. They teamed up with Richard Tsukiji to include classic gaming memorabilia at Tsukiji's annual World of Atari show. The show was held in Las Vegas at the Holiday Inn Boardwalk Hotel and Casino on August 21–23, 1998. The event was such a success that Hardie and Iida decided to break away from World of Atari and, along with Sean Kelly, created their own show, Classic Gaming Expo.

Classic Gaming Expo has been held at the following dates and places:

- 1999 – August 14–15 – Las Vegas – Plaza Hotel
- 2000 – July 29–30 – Las Vegas – Plaza Hotel
- 2001 – August 11–12 – Las Vegas – Plaza Hotel
- 2002 – August 10–11 – Las Vegas – Plaza Hotel
- 2003 – August 9–10 – Las Vegas – Plaza Hotel
- 2004 – August 21–22 – San Jose – McEnery Convention Center
- 2005 – August 20–21 – Burlingame, California – San Francisco Airport Hilton
- 2007 – July 28–29 - Las Vegas - Riviera Hotel
- 2010 – July 31-August 1 – Las Vegas – Tropicana
- 2012 – August 11–12 – Las Vegas – Plaza Hotel
- 2014 – September 12–14 - Las Vegas - Riviera Hotel
