= John Mathieson (computer scientist) =

British computer chip designer

John Mathieson is a British computer chip designer who initially worked for Sinclair Research on the cancelled Loki computer project before co-founding Flare with ex-Sinclair colleagues Martin Brennan and Ben Cheese.

After working at Flare on the Flare 1 and its development into the Konix Multisystem, he worked for Atari Corporation developing the Atari Panther video game console. It was abandoned in favor of its successor, the Atari Jaguar. The Jaguar was commercially released in the United States on November 23, 1993. Mathieson has been called "the father of the Jaguar."

After leaving Atari, Mathieson worked on the development of the ill-fated NUON media processor at VM Labs. He moved to work for Nvidia at the end of 2001. As Director of Mobile Systems Architecture at Nvidia Corp. he led the system architecture team for three generations of the Tegra applications processor.
