= Martin Brennan (engineer) =

British engineer

Martin Brennan is a computer engineer who developed pioneering personal computers such as the Loki (for Sinclair Research) and the Atari Jaguar video game console.

A physics graduate of Cambridge University, he was a co-founder of Flare Technology, a design house involved in the design of the ill-fated Konix Multisystem.

Brennan initially worked for Sinclair Research where he designed the digital electronics and software in ZX Interface 1 before going on to found Flare with ex-Sinclair colleagues John Mathieson and Ben Cheese. After working at Flare on the Flare 1 and its development into the Konix Multisystem, he went on to work for Atari developing the Atari Panther and the Atari Jaguar.

In 1997 Brennan founded the "Cheap & Cheerful Chip Company" which later went on to become Global Silicon Limited.

In 2007 Brennan designed the Brennan JB7 digital jukebox produced by 3GA Ltd (Third Generation Audio). The second generation audio player, Brennan B2 with web interface, based on the Raspberry Pi chipset, is available as of 2015. In 2019, Brennan released the n Brennan BB1 audio player which shares the same software and architecture of the B2 but packages it in portable radio format at a lower price. Featuring an integrated speaker and ability to run on 4 AA batteries, the BB1 is controllable via physical buttons or a smartphone/web app and can act also integrate with Spotify and Sonos.
