= Loki (computer) =

Sinclair home computer cancelled in 1986

- Type: Home computer
- Released: Cancelled
- Introductory price: £200
- Operating system: SuperBASIC variant, CP/M
- CPU: Z80 @ 7 MHz and equivalent
- Memory: 128 KB (1MB max)
- Removable storage: Floppy disk.
- Display: 512×256 with 16 colours, 256×212 with 64 or 256 colours
- Graphics: Rasterop chip
- Sound: 8-bit DAC
- Input: MIDI, lightpen, joystick

Loki was the code name for a cancelled home computer developed at Sinclair Research during the mid-1980s. The name came from the Norse god Loki, god of mischief and thieves. Loki was based on the ZX Spectrum, but intended to rival the Amiga for video games.

Loki followed two earlier, aborted research projects from Sinclair: the 68008-based SuperSpectrum home computer (cancelled in 1982) and the LC3 game console (cancelled in 1983).

== Design ==
According to an article published in Sinclair User magazine, Loki was to have a 7 MHz Z80H CPU, a minimum of 128 KiB of RAM and two custom chips providing much enhanced video and audio capabilities compared to the ZX Spectrum, but with a compatibility mode. The video chip, referred to as the Rasterop chip, would have blitter-type functionality and three different modes: 512×256 pixels with 16 colours, 256×212 with 256 colours, or 256×212 with 64 colours and two bits per pixel used for "blitter objects". Comprehensive peripheral support was also claimed, including MIDI, lightpen, joystick and floppy disk. A version of the SuperBASIC language from the Sinclair QL was to be provided in place of the old Sinclair BASIC for the ZX Spectrum and support for the CP/M operating system was also intended. On top of this, the computer would cost as little as £200.

Another Spectrum magazine, Crash, poured scorn on the report in Sinclair User, dismissing the design as "dreamware" in the opinion of an ex-Sinclair designer they consulted, analysing the implied components and costs, and adding, "It may be fun to dream about Loki, but the fact is that it won't appear, and nor will anything like it." This was the rationale, according to Crash Technical Editor Simon Goodwin:

Being blessed with lots of headed typing paper and very little money, the Thinkers at Sinclair were invited to make a big list of trendy computer features. That list, embellished with a few charts and tables but a noticeable lack of circuit diagrams and real detail, finally escaped into the hands of the computer press. Despite six years of agonising experience of the difference between Sinclair specifications and reality they swallowed it whole. Technical know-how has never been a strong point in magazines that still—indeed, the same month—print Commodore 64 screen shots in their Spectrum software preview section.

—

== History ==
In the aftermath of Amstrad buying out Sinclair's computer business in 1986, some confusion arose as to which company had the rights to pursue the project further. Some reports indicated that Amstrad retained such rights, one claiming that "the blueprint is now in Amstrad's hands", whereas others asserted that the Amstrad deal had left the rights to products based on newer technology with Sinclair. Such contradictory interpretations were reconciled in an interview with Clive Sinclair himself, indicating that the design remained in Sinclair's hands, but exploitation of the design remained subject to Amstrad's control due to the product's Spectrum compatibility features. Ultimately, the project was cancelled.

Martin Brennan and John Mathieson, two Sinclair engineers, took the Loki concept with them and founded Flare Technology. There they worked on the cancelled Konix Multisystem game console, then later worked with Atari Corporation on the Panther (cancelled) and Jaguar systems. According to Jaguar developer Andrew Whittaker, two other Sinclair employees, Bruce Gordon and Alan Miles, who went on to form Miles Gordon Technology, also used some of the designs in the SAM Coupé.
