= Ben Cheese =

British engineer

Ben Cheese (1955 – 21 January 2001) was a British engineer who worked on Sinclair's ZX Microdrives. Authors Ian Adamson and Richard Kennedy, in their book Sinclair and the "Sunrise" Technology, write that "it seems only fair to note that it was the tenacity and imagination of R&D staffer Ben Cheese that got the product [i.e., the Microdrive] to the market".

When Sinclair was sold, Cheese formed a company called Flare Technology with two other former Sinclair engineers, John Mathieson and Martin Brennan. Brennan and Mathieson went on to form Flare II, and to develop the Atari Jaguar console. Meanwhile, Cheese worked with Argonaut Software and Nintendo to develop the Super FX chip used in Super Nintendo Entertainment System games such as Star Fox.

Besides his engineering work, Ben Cheese also drew some mildly subversive cartoons for the Sinclair in-house newsletter called WHAM!, or What's Happening At Milton.

Ben Cheese died from cancer at age 46.
