= Atari XEGS =

1987 video game console

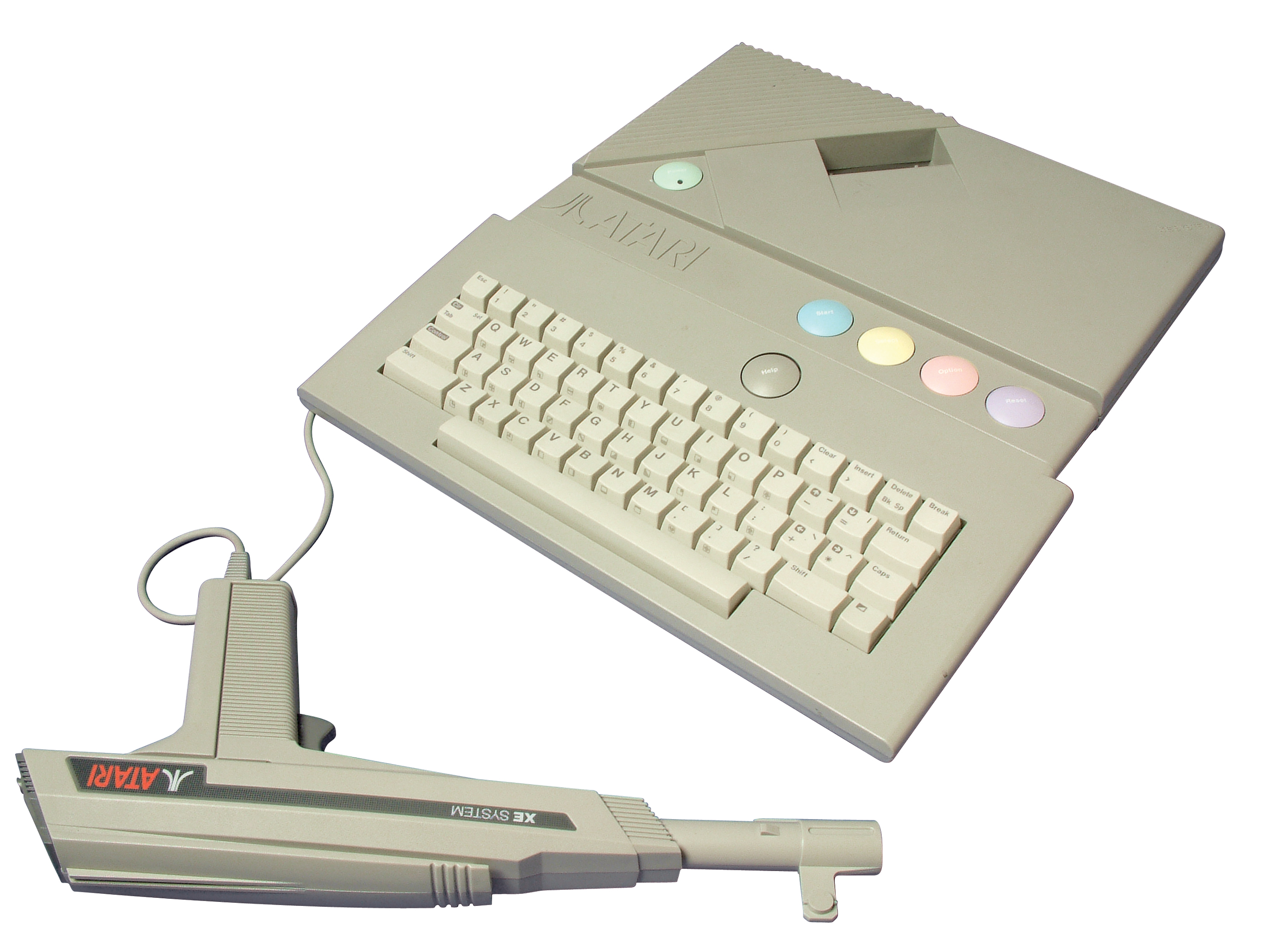
- Manufacturer: Atari Corporation
- Type: Home video game console Home computer
- Generation: Third (8-bit era)
- Released: late 1987
- Introductory price: US$159 (equivalent to $450 in 2025)
- Discontinued: December 1991
- Units sold: 100,000
- Media: ROM cartridge
- CPU: MOS Technology 6502C @ 1.79 MHz
- Memory: 64KB RAM
- Display: RF and composite out, 384 × 240 (overscan), 16 colors from a 256 color palette
- Graphics: ANTIC (graphics); GTIA (video)
- Sound: POKEY
- Backward compatibility: Atari 8-bit computers
- Predecessor: Atari 7800
- Successor: Panther (canceled); Jaguar

The Atari XE Video Game System (Atari XEGS) is an industrial redesign of the Atari 65XE home computer and the final model in the Atari 8-bit computer series. It was released by Atari Corporation in 1987 and marketed as a home video game console alongside the Nintendo Entertainment System, Sega's Master System, and Atari's own Atari 7800. The XEGS is compatible with existing Atari 8-bit computer hardware and software. Without keyboard, the system operates as a stand-alone game console. With the keyboard, it boots identically to the Atari XE computers. Atari packaged the XEGS as a basic set consisting of only the console and joystick, and as a deluxe set consisting of the console, keyboard, CX40 joystick, and XG-1 light gun.

The XEGS release was backed by new games, including Barnyard Blaster and Bug Hunt, plus cartridge ports of older games, such as Fight Night (Accolade, 1985), Lode Runner (Broderbund, 1983), Necromancer (Synapse Software, 1982), and Ballblazer (Lucasfilm Games, 1985). Support for the system was dropped in 1992 along with the rest of the 8-bit computer line, the Atari 2600, and the Atari 7800.

== Development ==
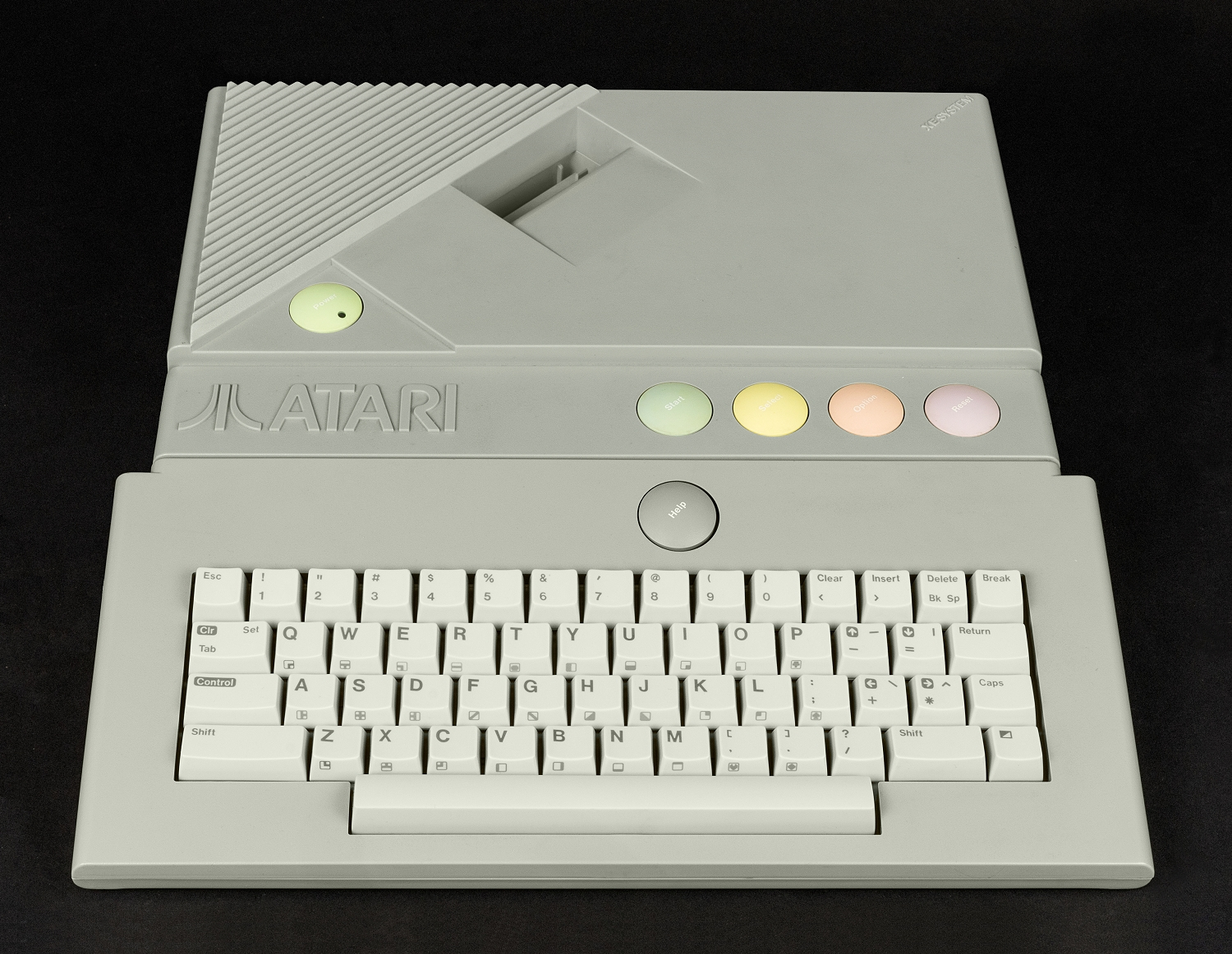
Atari XEGS with keyboard

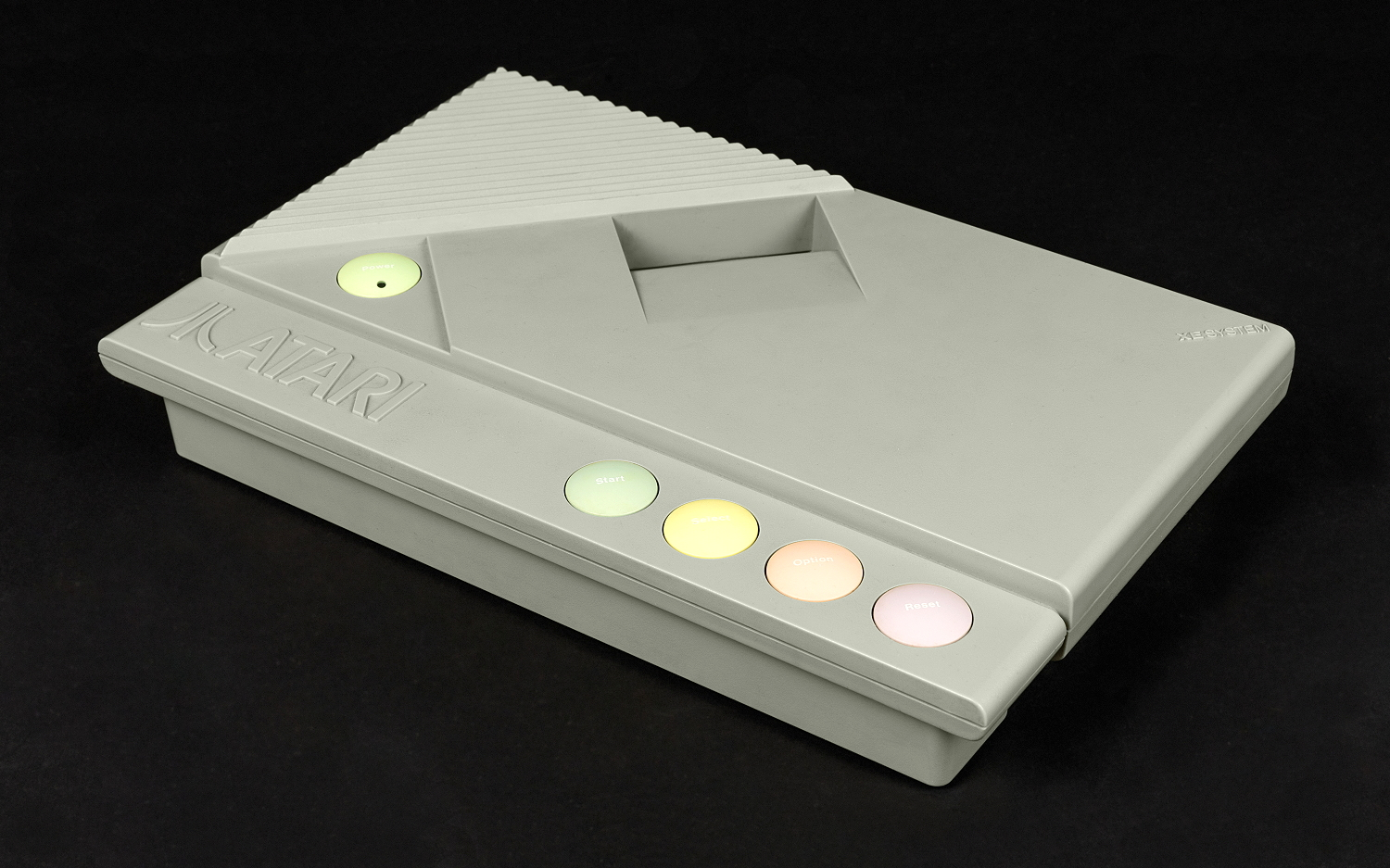
Atari XEGS

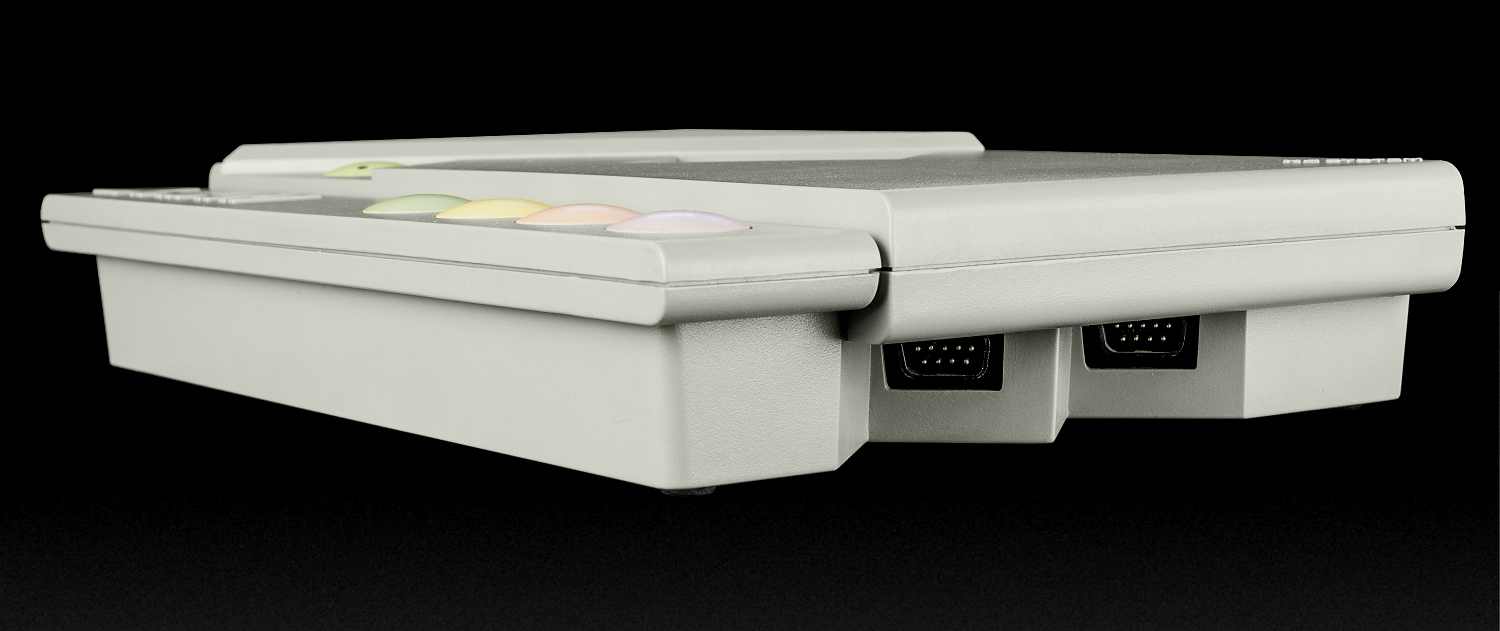
Joystick ports

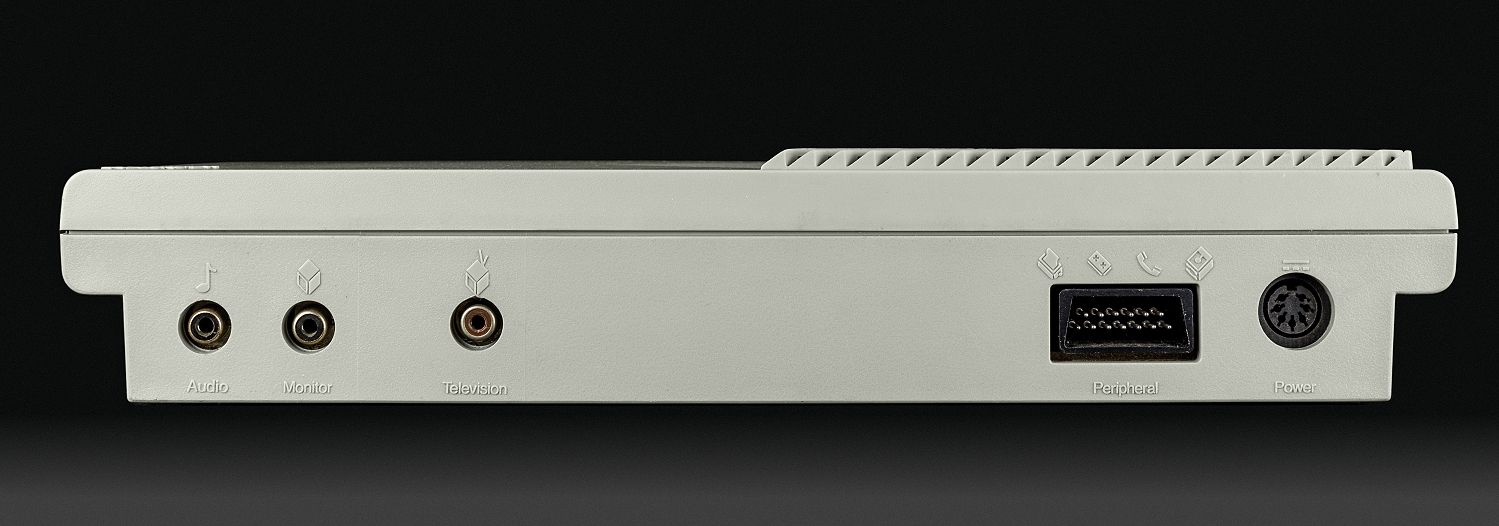
Rear input and output ports

In 1984, following the video game crash of 1983 when Atari, Inc. had great financial difficulties as a division of Warner Communications, John J. Anderson of Creative Computing stated that Atari should have released a video game console in 1981 based on its Atari 8-bit computers and compatible with that software library. The company instead released the Atari 5200, which is based on the 8-bit computers but is incompatible with their software.

After Jack Tramiel purchased the company, Atari Corporation re-released two game consoles in 1986: the Atari 7800, which had previously been released in a brief test run in 1984; and a lower cost redesign of the Atari 2600.

Atari conceived the console in a plan to increase the company's console market share while improving sales of its 8-bit home computer family which had started with the Atari 400 and 800. Providing a "beginning computer" and "sophisticated game console" in one device, was thought to convince more retailers and software developers to support the platform. Matthew Ratcliff, who had been contributing editor for Antic magazine, recalled that "Atari executives asked the heads of several major toy store chains which product they'd rather sell—the powerful 65XE home computer for about $80, or a fancy new game system for about $150. The answer was, 'You can keep the computer, give us that game machine!" In May 1987, Atari's Director of Communications, Neil Harris, updated the online Atari community by outlining this plan, noting that the XEGS was intended to further the 8-bit line by providing mass-merchants with a device that was more appealing to their markets.

The XEGS is a repackaged Atari 65XE home computer, compatible with the existing range of Atari 8-bit computer software and peripherals, and thus can function as a home computer. At a more premium US$159 (equivalent to about $450 in 2025), it co-existed with the Atari 7800 and remodeled Atari 2600, and was occasionally featured alongside those systems in Atari print ads and television commercials.

Atari Corporation discontinued their 8-bit product line, including the XEGS, in December 1991.

== Games ==
The XEGS shipped with the Atari 8-bit version of Missile Command built in, Flight Simulator II bundled with the keyboard component, and Bug Hunt which is compatible with the light gun. As the XEGS is compatible with the earlier 8-bit software, many games released under the XEGS banner are simply older games rebadged. This was done to the extent that some games were shipped in the old Atari 400/800 packaging, bearing only a new sticker to indicate that they are also compatible with the XEGS.

== Peripherals ==
The XEGS was released in a basic set and a deluxe set. The basic set includes only the console, and a standard CX40 joystick with a grey base to match the XEGS rather than its original black. The deluxe set consists of the console, the CX40 joystick, a keyboard which enables home computer functionality, and the XG-1 light gun. The keyboard and light gun were also released separately outside North America. This is the first light gun produced by Atari, and it is also compatible with the Atari 7800 and Atari 2600.

The system can use Atari 8-bit computer peripherals, such as disk drives, modems, and printers.

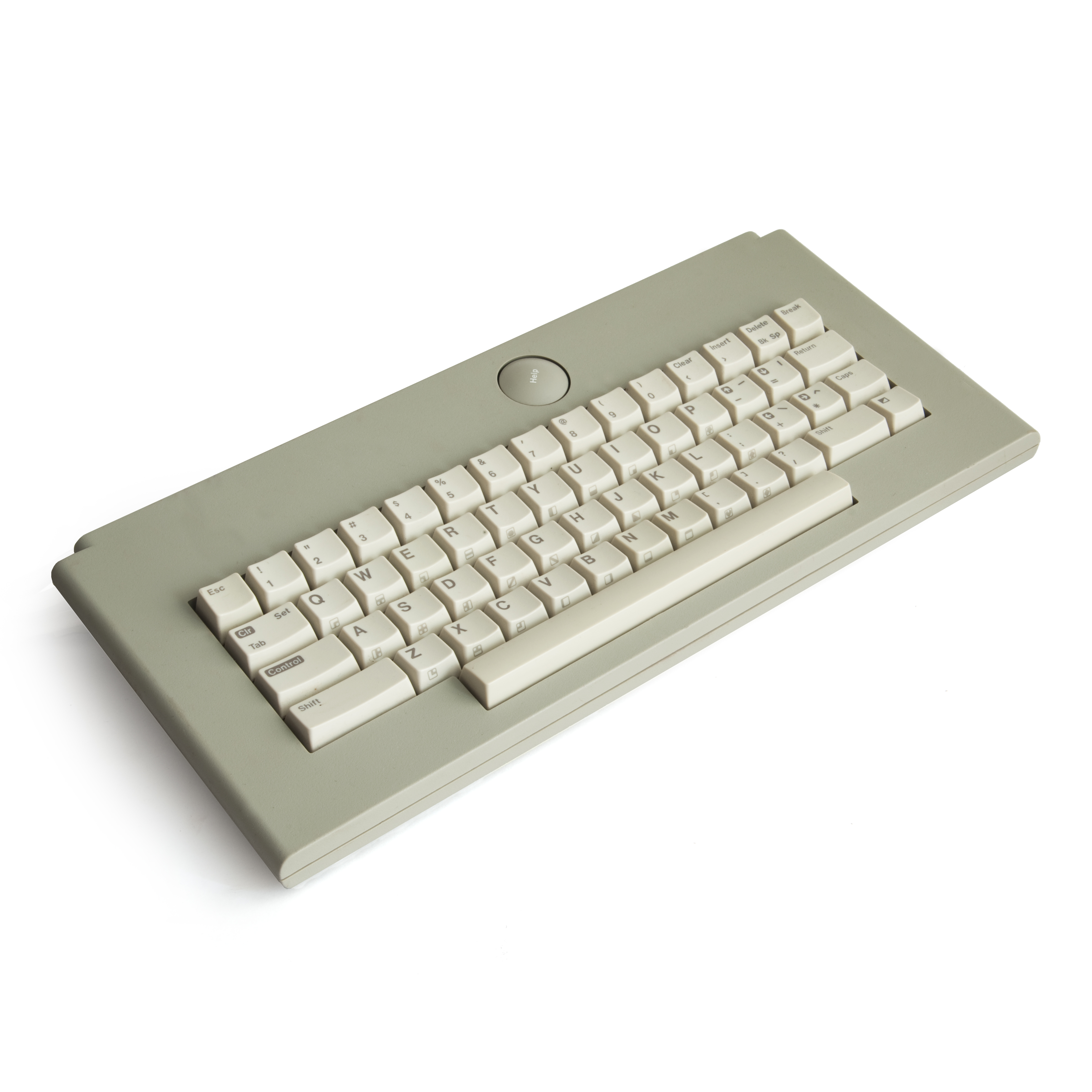
XEGS keyboard

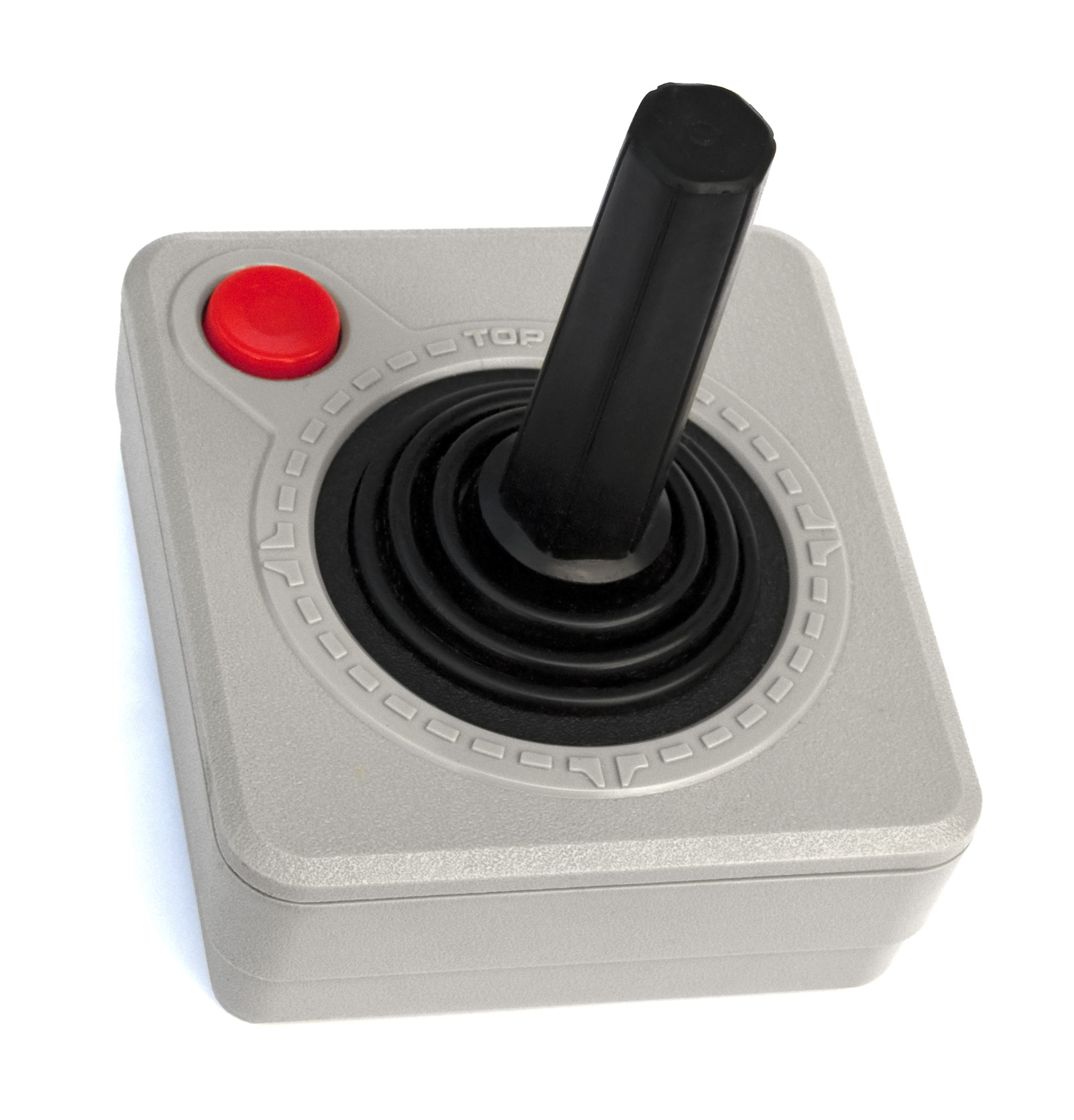
CX40 joystick in XEGS color scheme

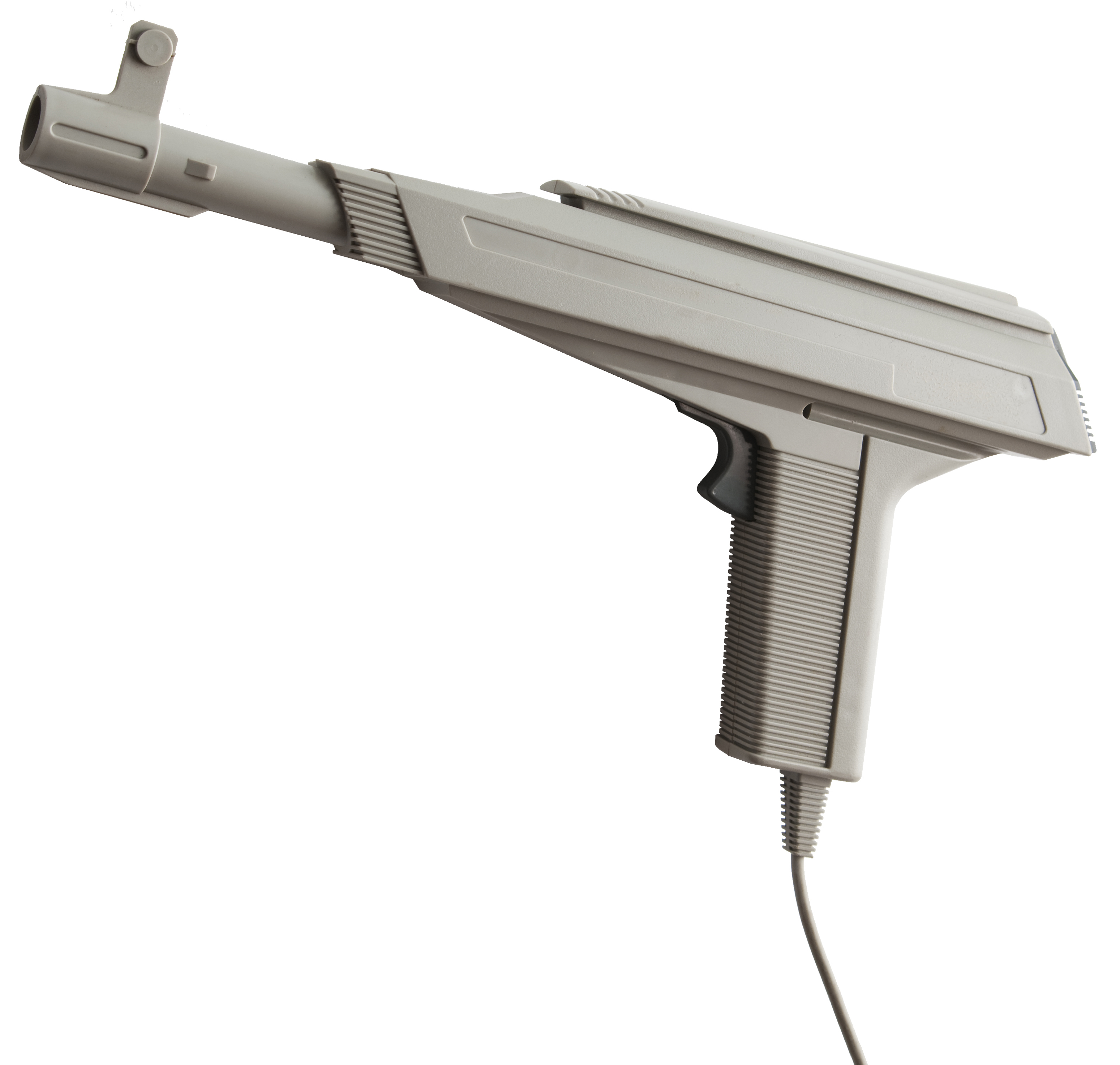
XG-1 light gun

== Reception ==
Atari sold 100,000 XE Game Systems during the Christmas season in 1987, every unit that was produced during its launch window. Matthew Ratcliff called the game and computer combination "a brilliant idea", which "has been selling out almost as fast as toy stores can get them in". He said, "The XEGS may not seem like such a hot idea to serious Atari computer users. But just think about it. If you were afraid of computers or don't have the foggiest idea what to do with one, you'd have absolutely no interest in an Atari 65XE—even if it could play great games. However, you'd probably have no compunction about buying a great video game system, the XEGS, as a new addition to the family entertainment center." In 1988, he wrote in Antic magazine that, to switch between light gun and joystick games, active XEGS gamers are frustrated by the need to continually re-plug their devices and power cycle the system, due to the system's lack of autodetection, which is complicated by its awkwardly downward slanting ports. He said "Barnyard Blaster and Bug Hunt could have been just a bit smarter" by including the simple routine that he was forced to write and publish as a workaround.

Computer Entertainer was highly skeptical of the XEGS prior to launch. Following its announcement at Winter CES 1987, they wondered why anyone would choose it over a similar Atari 8-bit computer like the 65XE or 130XE. Atari's answer that "some people don't want anything to do with computers" was unconvincing due to the system's keyboard. At Summer CES, Computer Entertainer questioned why Atari was producing new hardware instead of shipping software for the Atari 7800 (which had a total of 10 games at the time, all of which had shipped more than six months prior). At launch, they criticized the joysticks, which they saw as outdated, and described the keyboard as "stiff and easy to make mistakes with." They also criticized the lack of original software, including the pack-in title Missile Command which they believed most players had grown out of, and recommended consumers not to buy the system unless "some pattern of new, exciting titles become available."

== See also ==
- History of Atari
- Atari 8-bit peripherals
- Commodore 64 Games System
