= Global Silicon =

Global Silicon Limited
- Type: Private
- Industry: Semiconductors
- Founded: October 28, 1997
- Founder: Martin Brennan, Morgan Colmer
- Headquarters: Hong Kong SAR
- Number of locations: Hong Kong SAR, China PRC
- Products: Semiconductors
- Services: Consultancy
- Website: www.global-silicon.com

Global Silicon Limited is a fabless semiconductor company founded in 1997 in Cambridge, United Kingdom. It designed and produced system level semiconductors for the consumer audio market. Initial products focused on solutions for CD players, later expanding to also include MP3 and WMA compressed formats. Global Silicon's DART IC was used in the CD/MP3 Boombox (Philips AZ3038) and a subsequent IC (Xin) was used in a number of consumer products including the CD/MP3/WMA boombox (Packard Bell OP10). Global Silicon created a number of patents to cover the new technology that had been created. Global Silicon did not achieve commercial success, the investors decided to close the company in 2006 citing lack of sales traction. In 2007, the CTO of Global Silicon purchased the company's intellectual property (excluding patents), stock and assets including a HK subsidiarity and has been operating the company from Hong Kong since. Currently Global Silicon is a consulting company and consumer audio design house.

== Founding and investment ==
Global Silicon was founded in Cambridge, UK by engineer Martin Brennan. Initially the company was called "The Cheap & Cheerful Chip Company Limited". Brennan was joined by engineer Morgan Colmer in 1998. Together Brennan and Colmer developed an FPGA based demonstration for a new CD player IC that integrated the functions of several system ICs into one system-on-a-chip (SoC). After successfully raising £2 million (GBP) from investment firm MTI in 1999, the company went on to turn the demonstration system into an ASIC. The company changed its name to Global Silicon prior to the first round of investment. In 2005, Global Silicon received further investment of £5.7 million (GBP) from a consortium of investors made up of MTI, Quester and Celtic House.

== Management ==
- William Jeffrey served as CEO and Chairman from the initial investment in 1999 until he took a leave of absence in 2006 following being diagnosed with terminal cancer.
- Martin Brennan served as Managing Director until he left Global Silicon in 2001 to form a new audio company called 3GA.
- Morgan Colmer served as the CTO for the company until 2006 and then participated in the management buy out of company assets and from 2007 has served as the Managing Director.
- David Leith served as the CEO of the company from 2003 until 2004.
- Steve Cliff served as Sales and Marketing Director from 2004 to 2005.
- Andrew Hamer served as Sales and Marketing Director from 2002 to 2003.
- Nick Rich served as CFO from December 2004 to October 2006, then served as Managing Director until December 2006.

== Products ==
Global Silicon produced 6 different ICs with varying degrees of success. All of the semiconductor products are now discontinued.

IC name	date of release	number produced	target products	details
DART	2003	<100K	CD/MP3 boombox	0.35μm NEC process
ARROW	2003	<1K	CD/MP3 boombox	0.5μm AMS process. Was never brought to productions due to cost issues
DART2	2004	<1K	test chip	0.35μm CSM process. Was created as a test device for the next ICs
Xin	2004	<1000K	CD/MP3/WMA boombox	0.18μm CSM process
Xif	2005	<1K	Flash MP3 Player	0.18μm CSM process. Not released due to a major bug
Xif2	2006	<1K	Flash MP3 Player	0.18μm CSM process. Bug fixed version of Xif

== Patents and technology ==
Global Silicon's initial products focussed on the Compact Disc player market and one of the key pieces of technology that was created on the Xin-Core platform, was a complete CD player including servo, data decoder and audio player. Upon this base, the company also created their own hand-crafted implementations of MP3 and WMA decoders. Additional DSP effects were created as was a User Interface (UI) layer that could easily be customised for the majority of consumer audio applications. Patents created by the company were:

- Digital audio processing
- Driver circuit for a liquid crystal display
- Radio receiver
  - Divisional filing for above relating to novel demodulation technique
- Method for cancelling a beat frequency in a radio receiver
- De-bouncing Circuit
- Replaying digital media
- Sigma-delta modulator
- Random number generator
- Flash memory error correction
- A sigma delta modulator utilizing feedback loop and logic circuit
- A network set-up device
- Radio tuner user interface

== Closing the UK company ==
In December 2006, the board decided to close the business and a buyer was sought for the IP, stock and assets. The investors cited "investment in Global Silicon was written off following its failure to get significant sales traction despite having a proven product". It is also self-evident that the loss of the company's Chairman, William Jeffrey due to cancer will have factored in the decision process. The timing of the closure was also at a pivotal point in the consumer audio market, with Compact Disc equipment sales falling and being replaced with products such as the iPod. The company's patent portfolio was sold separately.

== Management buyout ==
In January 2007, the company CTO, Morgan Colmer, purchased from the administrators the intellectual property (IP), stock and assets of the company including a Hong Kong subsidiary. All assets and intellectual property were then transferred to the subsidiary company (of the same name) and has operated since as a consulting business in Asia.
