= Flare Technology =

Defunct computer hardware company

- Industry: Computer hardware
- Founded: 1986; 40 years ago
- Founder: Martin Brennan; Ben Cheese; John Mathieson
- Headquarters: Cambridge, England, United Kingdom
- Products: Flare One; Konix Multisystem; Flare II

Flare Technology was a computer hardware company based in Cambridge, United Kingdom. It was founded in 1986 by Martin Brennan, Ben Cheese, and John Mathieson, former engineers at Sinclair Research.

== History ==
Flare One
- Manufacturer: Flare Technology
- Type: video game console/home computer
- Released: technology demonstrator
- CPU: Z80B, custom DSP
- Memory: 1 MB
- Display: Composite and RGB output, 256 × 256 with 256 colors; 512 × 256 with 16 colors
- Sound: 8 channel sound
- Input: Keyboard, light pen
- Connectivity: RS232, MIDI in/out, Joystick
- Successor: Konix Multisystem

Flare Technology first worked for Amstrad before developing a technology-demonstrator system called Flare One. The Flare One was intended as a home computer or games console with extensive audio and video capabilities.

Related to the Loki project they had worked on previously at Sinclair Research, which in turn was derived from the ZX Spectrum home computer, Flare One was based around a Zilog Z80B CPU (working as an 8-bit-per-pixel blitter and a video controller) and a custom 16-bit DSP chip (responsible for 8 channel sound and 3D computation), 1 MB or RAM, with a display resolution of 256 x 256 with 256 colors or 512 x 256 with 16 colors, and an expected price of £200 in 1988.

Flare One was used in some arcade game cabinets including a line of video quiz machines produced by Bellfruit (A Question of Sport, Beeline, Every Second Counts, Inquizitor, Quizvaders and Treble Top). The Flare One chipset was further developed into the Konix Multisystem Slipstream prototype.

In 1989 Martin Brennan was contracted by Atari Corp. to complete and implement the chip design of the unreleased Atari Panther.

Martin Brennan and John Mathieson went on to design the Flare II, which was purchased by Atari and became Atari Jaguar.
