= Missile Command 3D =

1995 video game

- Developer: Virtuality Entertainment
- Publisher: Atari Corporation
- Producer: John Skruch
- Designers: James Tripp; Mark Brown; Martin Brownlow; Robert Powers; Scot Jones
- Programmer: Martin Brownlow
- Artists: Mark Brown; Scot Jones
- Composer: Dale Robins
- Series: Missile Command
- Platform: Atari Jaguar
- Release: NA: December 12, 1995; EU: December 1995
- Genre: Shoot 'em up
- Mode: Single-player

Missile Command 3D is a 1995 shoot 'em up video game developed by Virtuality Entertainment and published for the Atari Jaguar. As part of Atari's 2000 series of arcade game revivals, it is an update of Dave Theurer's arcade game Missile Command (1980). The game has the player defend six cities from incoming missiles by launching anti-ballistic missiles.

Virtuality agreed to create a Jaguar VR headset for Atari, which included development of Missile Command 3D. The game was ultimately completed by Martin Barlow as lead programmer, but the VR headset was cancelled due to health concerns. It remains the only game compatible with the peripheral. Missile Command 3D received mixed reviews from critics; Journalists were divided regarding the "Original" mode, but gave more favorable comments to the "3D" mode, while others considered the "Virtual" mode to be the best variant. Retrospective commentary for the game has been generally favorable. In 2022, it was included in the Atari 50 compilation.

== Gameplay ==

Top: Original mode gameplay
Middle: 3D mode gameplay
Bottom: Virtual mode gameplay

Missile Command 3D is a shoot 'em up game based on the arcade game Missile Command, where the player defends a city by firing missiles at incoming targets. The player's anti-ballistic missiles also leave a temporary trail of fire, which destroys enemy missiles caught within range. Each base becomes useless when all of its missiles have been deployed or if it is destroyed by enemy missiles. Other hazards include bomber planes and satellites, as well as smart missiles that can evade the player's missiles. The player can rebuild destroyed cities by reaching certain high scores at the end of each level.

The game offers three modes: "Original", "3D", and "Virtual". Original mode is a recreation of Missile Command, offering graphics and gameplay similar to the arcade original. 3D mode is similar to the original mode but with three-dimensional visuals. Virtual mode departs from the original gameplay by introducing a first-person perspective, power-ups, varied stages and bosses. In all three game modes, the goal is to defend six cities from incoming missiles by launching anti-ballistic missiles from three bases. The game is set in a country attacked by foreign nations and on a distant planet where alien forces invade human colonies.

In Virtual mode, players mainly defend the cities using lasers, with missiles becoming a secondary defense mechanism. Power-up items offer upgrades such as improved lasers, smart bombs, and repairs. There are three stages in virtual mode, each divided into three waves with a boss encounter. There are also three difficulty levels in virtual mode, however, the game ends after finishing the first stage if played on the easiest difficulty. The game is over once all bases or cities in the stage are destroyed. The game features support for the ProController. If a Jaguar VR headset is detected, it can be played with in both 3D and Virtual modes.

== Development ==
Missile Command 3D is an update of Dave Theurer's arcade game Missile Command (1980). It was developed by Virtuality Entertainment (previously W Industries), a Leicester-based virtual reality (VR) developer founded in 1987. In 1993, Atari announced a VR peripheral for the Atari Jaguar and approached Virtuality to produce it, but no agreement was settled. After discussions resumed in 1994, the companies announced a partnership in 1995, leading to the production of a VR headset for the Jaguar based on Virtuality's technology. According to the terms of the deal, Virtuality would develop software that would allow Atari and third-party developers to produce VR-compatible titles, while Atari would finance Virtuality's production of two VR games for Jaguar, including Missile Command.

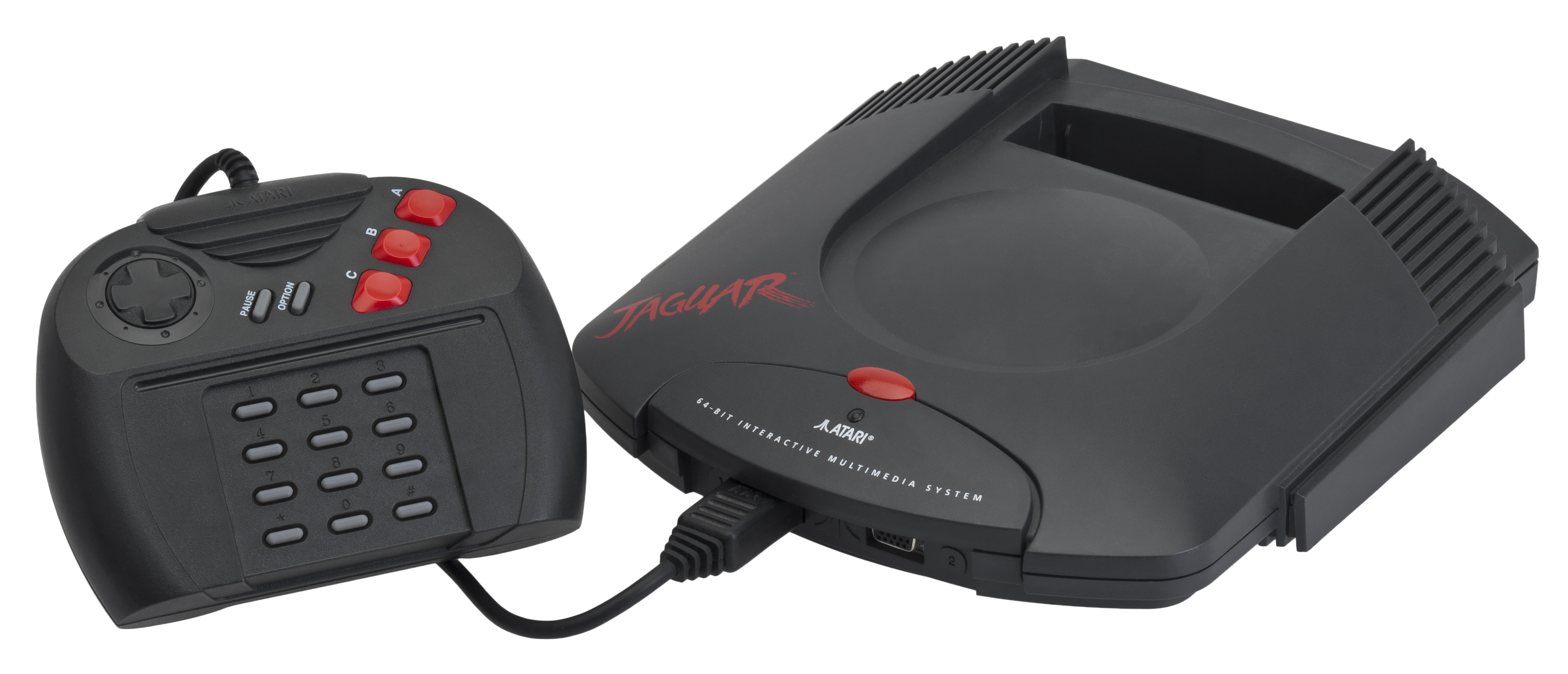
Atari partnered with Virtuality to make a virtual reality (VR) peripheral for the Jaguar. Atari would also finance Virtuality's development of Jaguar VR games, including Missile Command

Missile Command became part of a series of arcade game revivals from Atari, a strategy initiated by producer John Skruch after the release of Tempest 2000. The game was programmed by Martin Brownlow, who had previously written the VR arcade games Buggy Ball and Virtuality Boxing. Brownlow also acted as co-designer of the "Virtual" mode alongside James Tripp, as well as artists Mark Brown and Scot Jones. Robert Powers of Atari was responsible for designing the "3D" mode, while the soundtrack was composed by Dale Robins.

Despite his initial skepticism towards adapting Missile Command into virtual reality, Brownlow eventually agreed to take part in the project. According to Brownlow, the 3D mode was written in two weeks, but he did not receive support for the Original mode from Atari, which instead provided him with a design document for the Microsoft Arcade iteration of Missile Command for reference. Atari demanded that he implement texture mapping even though Brownlow explained that texture-mapped polygons would cause performance issues. Near the end of the project, Skruch wanted a type of missile similar to a MIRV that would target the player's bases and said to call it "SWIRV", but the name was changed by Brownlow to "Unknown". Brownlow found it difficult to develop for the Jaguar hardware due to its limited GPU memory, as well as a bug in the Blitter processor. Production of the game took six months, and development was complete by December 11, 1995.

== Release ==
The game was first showcased at E3 1995 under the name Missile Command 2000, intended for release with the Jaguar VR peripheral in Christmas 1995. It made appearances at Atari during "Fun 'n' Games Day", an event to showcase upcoming Atari Jaguar games to journalists. The game was released under its final name, Missile Command 3D, in North America on December 12, 1995, followed by Europe the same month. After the game's release, the Jaguar VR headset was cancelled. A PC port was to be published by Atari Interactive, but it was never released due to the division's closure in 1996. In 2022, Missile Command 3D was re-released for the first time as part of the Atari 50 compilation, porting the game to Nintendo Switch, PlayStation 4, Xbox One, and Windows PCs.

== Reception ==
Reception

Review scores
Publication	Score
Computer and Video Games	3/5
Game Players	83%
Next Generation	2/5
ST Format	75%
Atari Fan	88/100
Digital Press	7/10
Game Zero Magazine	27/50
ST-Computer	76%
ST Magazine	57%
Ultimate Future Games	30%
Ultimate Gamer	7/10
VideoGames	8/10

Missile Command 3D received mixed reviews, with journalists being divided on their opinion of the "Original" mode. Game Players' Chris Charla said that the mode was fun from a nostalgic viewpoint, while Game Zero Magazine described it as a faithful port of the arcade original. However, Ultimate Future Games saw it as nothing more than a nostalgic novelty. ST Format's Iain Laskey felt that the original mode was a poor replica of Missile Command, while Digital Press' Edward Villalpando felt that the different background borders added nothing to the original mode. Marc Abramson of the French ST Magazine criticized the original mode as slow and unplayable.

Meanwhile, the "3D" mode received more favorable commentary. Computer and Video Games' Paul Davies praised its audiovisual presentation. Charla found the updated polygonal graphics to be enjoyable. VideoGames thought the explosion effects in 3D mode were impressive but the lens flare effect seemed artificial. Abramson said that the 3D mode was an improvement over the Original mode. Villalpando found it difficult to get into the 3D mode due to the lack of a missile launch sound cue. Ultimate Future Games felt that the 3D mode is the same as the original mode in terms of content. Next Generation noted that it offers a convincing three-dimensional feel but not enough to become boring after a few rounds.

The Virtual mode received mostly positive reception. Next Generation regarded Virtual mode to be the best of the three versions, while feeling that its gameplay deserved to be expanded. Davies felt that the mode updated the game with the first-person perspective, while Charla saw that it did a good job of updating the arcade original with power-ups and different stages. Villalpando considered it to be the most interesting variant due to the bosses, but disliked the mechanics for manually detonating missiles. Ultimate Future Games regarded Virtual mode to be the most fun of the three variants but they still found it very repetitive, while Abramson found it boring after a few minutes. Game Zero Magazine criticized the mode's frame rate, while German publication ST-Computer noted crashes and instability on European Atari Jaguar consoles.

Retrospective commentary for Missile Command 3D has been generally favorable. The Atari Times' Bruce Clarke felt that the Virtual mode showed off the Jaguar's capabilities, comparing it favorably to contemporary games for the PlayStation and Nintendo 64. Polish magazine Click! Konsole highlighted the graphics in 3D mode as well as the large final bosses in Virtual mode. GamesTM regarded it as one of the six best games for the Jaguar. Retro Gamer called it "a worthy update of one of the greatest arcade games of all time", while PCMag found it fun to play. In contrast, neXGam commended its three distinct modes and graphical effects but criticized its sluggish controls and poor gameplay variety.

== Legacy ==
Missile Command 3D was one of two games planned to launch with the Jaguar VR peripheral, but it was the only one released officially compatible with it. The deal between Atari and Virtuality Entertainment was falling through in 1995 and collapsed in 1996, with Atari cancelling the Jaguar VR due to health concerns. An arcade game based on the game titled Missile Command VR was developed by Simon Fox of Virtuality and released under the Atari Games license. In 2023, video game programmer Rich Whitehouse implemented VR support in Missile Command 3D for the Atari Jaguar emulator BigPEmu, allowing use of modern headsets such as the HTC Vive.
