= Zone Hunter =

1994 video game

- Attract title screen
- Developers: Taito, Virtuality Group
- Publishers: Taito, Virtuality Group
- Designer: Andy Smith
- Programmers: Jason Woodward; Tarique Naseem
- Artist: Mark Hardisty
- Composer: Mike Adams
- Platform: Arcade
- Release: WW: 1994
- Genres: First-person shooter, rail shooter
- Modes: Single-player, multiplayer
- Arcade system: 2000SU

Zone Hunter (Note: Japanese: ゾーン ハンター, Hepburn: Zōn Hantā) is a virtual reality first-person rail shooter video game developed and published in conjunction by Taito and Virtuality Group in 1994 for arcades, though the former is not credited in-game.

== Gameplay ==
Zone Hunter is a first-person shooter, and was one of the first VR arcade games.

== Development and release ==
Zone Hunter was co-developed by the UK-based virtual reality company Virtuality Group and the Japanese arcade specialist Taito. It was the first title in Virtuality's second generation (2000 series) of products introduced in 1994. It was produced at the same time as Sega's virtual reality Model 1 arcade game TecWar, (Note: Also known as ElectronicBrain.) which was also a joint effort with Virtuality. Taito conceived Zone Hunter and worked alongside Virtuality as a deal to bring the game into Japanese arcade markets under their banner. Due to low sales in the region, Taito terminated the deal between them and Virtuality, with the latter opening their own office in Japan afterwards.

A port for the Atari Jaguar was announced and planned to be released alongside the Jaguar VR headset peripheral at launch. A demo was created for demonstration purposes. However, neither the port nor the peripheral were ever released due to problems between Virtuality and Atari Corporation in their deal.

== Reception ==
Reception

Review scores
Publication	Score
Computer and Video Games	82/100
Next Generation	2/5
Sega Pro	8/10

Next Generation said that the game was neither as fun or playable as Doom, nor as "good looking" as Virtua Cop. Reviewing the game at Sega World, Sega Pro rated the game eight out of ten and concluded that "Virtuality's hard work and R&D is finally paying off" despite it not having "the final stroke of realism to put you in a Lawnmower Man-esque situation." Brian Osserman of Intelligent Gamer commented, "The game is fun, but it is highly questionable whether it is worth $5 a shot."
