= Virtuality (product) =

Virtual reality gaming machine

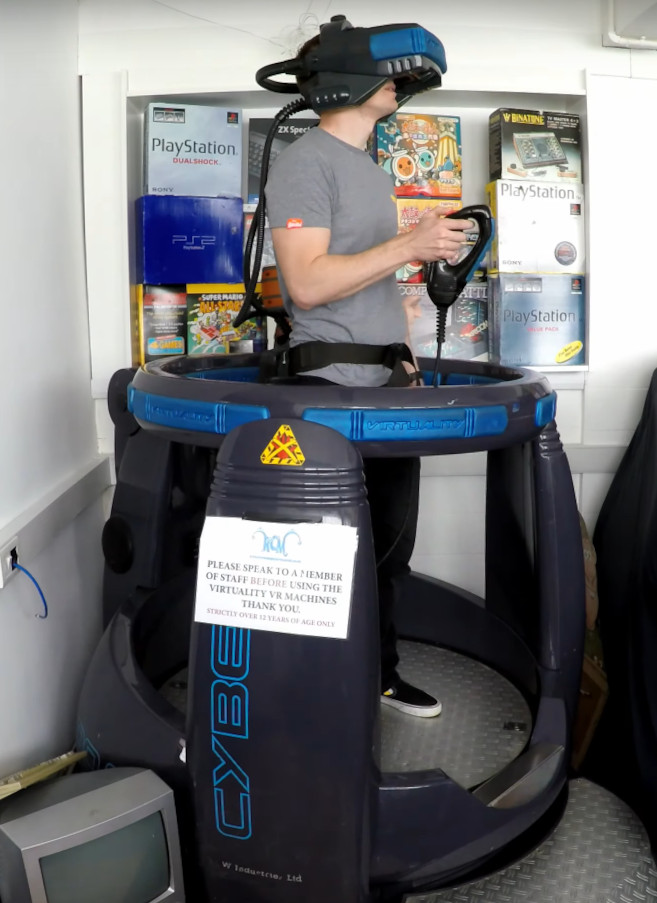
The 1991 Virtuality 1000CS arcade unit showing the headset and space joystick controller. The unit has original "W Industries" branding with Virtuality embossed and the word "cyber" prominently displayed on the side.

Virtuality was a range of virtual reality machines produced by Virtuality Group, and found in video arcades in the early 1990s. The machines delivered real-time VR gaming via a stereoscopic VR headset, joysticks, tracking devices and networked units for a multi-player experience.

Virtuality Group was originally founded in October 1987 as "W Industries", named after Dr. Jonathan D Waldern, and renamed to Virtuality in 1993. Work by Waldern at the Human Computer Interface Research Unit of Leicester Polytechnic (now De Montfort University), which later moved to Loughborough University, had by 1986 produced a system known as the "Roaming Caterpillar" that could deliver a stereoscopic view of a three-dimensional scene. The image was viewed on a moveable CRT screen using shutter glasses, with head and hand tracking incorporating acoustic sensors to determine the user's position. Waldern subsequently formed W Industries to commercialise 3D visualisation technology together with colleagues Al Humrich, Richard Holmes and Terry Rowley. The team would produce multiple prototype VR units (including the "giraffe", which was a mechanically tracked headset mounted on a boom arm) with a fifth prototype version being produced by 1989 that would form the basis of the first commercially released Virtuality system.

The Virtuality 1000SU VR system was launched in 1990 at the Computer Graphics ’90 exhibition held at Alexandra Palace in London. There were two types of units, referred to by the company as "pods". In one version the player stood up (SU) and in the other they sat down (SD). Both unit types used a virtual reality headset as a display (described as a "visette" in Virtuality documentation) that contained a pair of LCD screens originally with a resolution of 372x250 per eye. Four speakers and a microphone were also built into the headset.

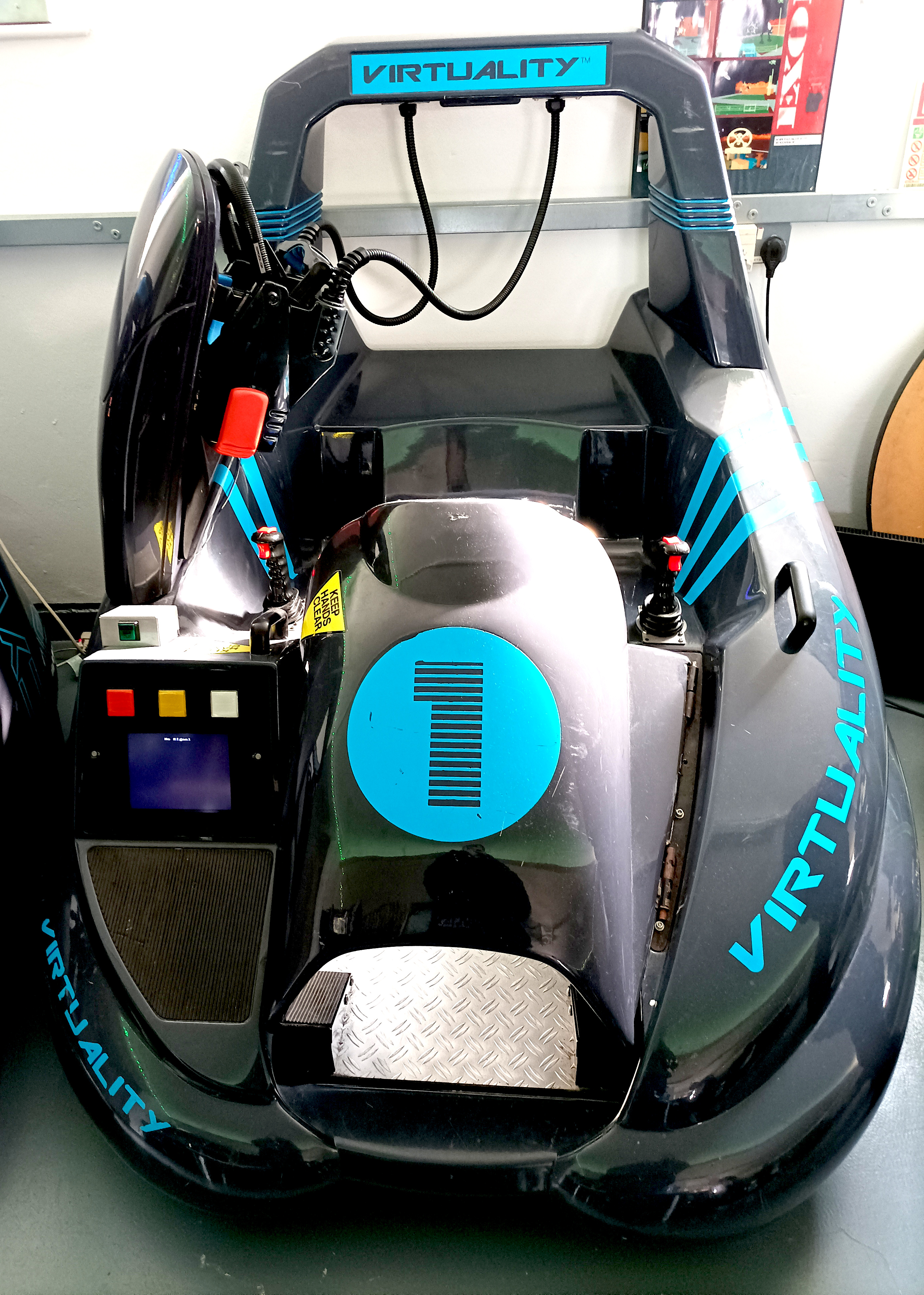
The 1000SD (sit-down) version of the Virtuality arcade system. The VR headset is hanging on a hook to the left. Two joysticks for controlling the game are either side of the seat.

The first two networked VR systems were sold to British Telecom Research Laboratories to experiment with networked telepresence applications. Many other systems were sold to corporations including Ford, IBM, Mitsubishi and Olin.

The availability of Virtuality systems coincided with a rise in public interest in virtual reality technology in the early 1990s, exemplified by the movie Lawnmower Man. To capitalise on this interest and determining that the largest market for the devices would be gaming, Virtuality produced an arcade variant of the 1000SU for public use called the 1000CS which was released in 1991. The CS postfix referred to "cyberspace" branding which was consistent with language being used in popular media to describe VR environments at the time.

Several non-gaming virtual reality systems were also created by the company including a VR attraction in partnership with Creative Agency Imagination for the launch of the 1995 Ford Galaxy and a virtual trading floor for the London International Financial Futures and Options Exchange (LIFFE).

Sales of arcade gaming systems ultimately declined following the general trend of customers transitioning to primarily home gaming. Virtuality did attempt to produce home VR systems but efforts were not successful and the company entered bankruptcy in 1997. Virtuality assets were sold to Cybermind Interactive Europe. By this time about 1,200 Virtuality arcade machines were in use. The arcade assets were acquired by Arcadian VR in 2004 and then by VirtuosityTech in 2012.

== 1000 series ==
The original 1000CS and 1000SD Virtuality units were powered by a Amiga 3000 with 4 MB of fast RAM and a CD-ROM. The Amiga included a pair of graphics accelerators (one for each eye) based around the Texas Instruments TMS34020 chips with a TMS34082 floating point co-processor. Each of these cards could deliver about 40 Mflops with a capability to render 30,000 polygons/s at 20FPS.

The 1000 series headset used a pair of LCD screens supplied by Panasonic with a resolution of 372x250 that were derived from a camcorder accessory. The screens were too heavy to be positioned directly in front of the user's eyes as the weight would unbalance the headset and drag it forwards. For this reason the screens were positioned either side of the headset and reflected with mirrors into the lenses.

The 1000CS version featured 6dof AC magnetic tracking delivered by a Polhemus Fastrack unit embedded in the waist height ring that surrounded the player. This device tracked both the headset and the freely moving controller, which was known as the "space joystick". The space joystick has two buttons. One button is typically used as a trigger for the game (e.g. a fire button) and the other button moves the player in the direction they are facing. The space joystick was holstered in a belt worn by the player that is tethered to the headset.

The SD version used a considerably lower cost DC magnetic tracking solution from Ascension that had the disadvantage of a shorter range. This issue was however acceptable given the user was seated and could not freely roam around. A bar (resembling a car roll cage) was mounted over the player's head that contained the tracking unit and maintained close proximity to the headset. The Ascension unit could only track one object and therefore could not track a controller in addition to the headset, however in this version the user used a fixed joystick, steering wheel or aircraft yoke (depending on the game) and a freely moving controller was not necessary.

=== 1000CS games ===
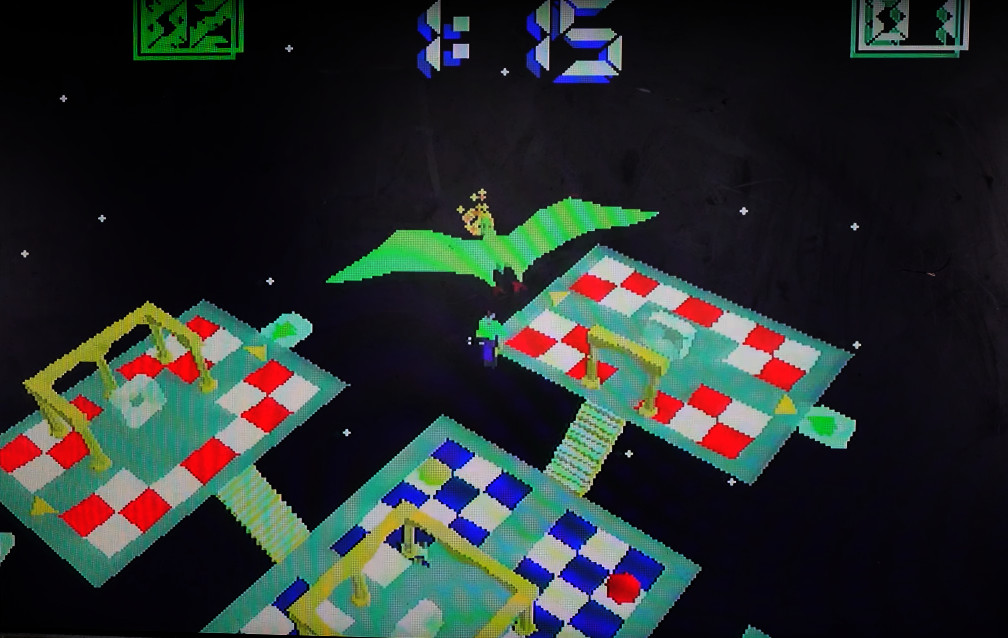
Virtuality Dactyl Nightmare VR game running on original 1000CS hardware

There were four original games for the 1000CS unit:

- Dactyl Nightmare - A first-person multi-player shooter featuring a map on several levels where players compete in deathmatch or capture the flag game modes. A pterodactyl flies overhead and occasionally swoops down to pick up unwary players. Players are represented by 3D human avatars drawn with polygons, the player can look down and see their own representation, and carry weapons that fire projectiles reacting to gravity.
- Grid Busters - Robot shoot-em-up.
- Hero - Locked door puzzle.
- Legend Quest - Fantasy adventure.

=== 1000SD games ===
- Battlesphere - a space battle game.
- Exorex - a multi-player mecha robot battle game (originally released under the title "Heavy Metal").
- Total Destruction - a stock car racing game.
- VTOL - a Harrier jump jet simulator.
- Flying Aces - a biplane dogfight simulator.

Virtuality's release surprised the existing VR industry. Despite crude graphics, it offered what Computer Gaming World in 1992 described as "all the necessary hallmarks of a fully immersive system at what, to many, is a cheap price. The main complaint ... has so far been its lack of resolution and software support".

== 2000 series ==
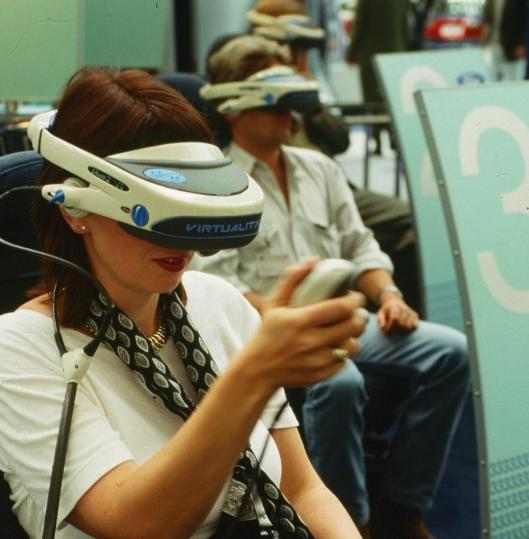
The lighter weight and higher resolution 2000 series headset, shown at a launch event for the Ford Galaxy in 1995

The 2000SU and SD models were introduced in 1994 with texture mapping and other enhanced graphics capabilities. The headset used in these models was a redesigned lighter weight version, with a higher resolution of 800x600 pixels per eye delivered by two 1.6" LCD screens now mounted for direct viewing and offering a wider field of view with an improved lens system.

The 2000 series was powered by a 33 MHz Intel 486DX based SBC host. A 1993 designed Virtuality proprietary card, known as the Expality PIX 1000, was used for graphics processing. The graphics card contained a pair of Motorola 88110 RISC processors, 8 MB of DRAM and 4 MB of VRAM. The graphics processors delivered around 200 MIPS and used a secondary card with a pair of Brooktree RAMDACs for analogue video output to the headset. It was possible to enhance the system performance by adding additional graphics processing cards. An Ensonic Soundscape card was used to deliver the audio.

Positioning was delivered by a Polhemus InsideTrak magnetic tracking card that could position multiple objects at a range up to 76 cm from a transmitter in 6dof with a static accuracy of about 1.3 cm and 2 degrees of rotation. A range of up to 1.5 m was possible with reduced precision.

Games available for the system included:

- Buggy Ball - A game of football played using cars in an arena in a similar style to Rocket League.
- Dactyl Nightmare SP
- Dactyl Nightmare 2 - Race for the Eggs
- Zone Hunter - a first-person on-rails shooter similar to Virtua Cop
- Pac-Man VR
- Shoot for Loot - a VR game show where the player competes with another contestant in various mini-games.
- Missile Command - a VR recreation of the classic arcade game.
- Ghost Train - the player rides a cart on rails through a mine.
- Virtuality Boxing - a boxing sports simulator
- Sphere - a capture-the-flag style title where the player controls a tank and has to capture a sphere while avoiding being hit by other players.
- X-Treme Strike - a space combat game

== 3000 series ==
The 3000 series was similar to the 2000 series machines but used an upgraded Intel Pentium based host and included a rifle shaped VR controller. The machines were offered in two versions, the SU-3000 was supplied with a generic rifle controller and the "Total Recoil" version had a replica Winchester controller that featured a CO_{2}-powered blowback mechanism. The "Total recoil" version shipped with the game package "Quickshot Carnival" which featured clay shooting and other target practice. The SU-3000 version shipped with the game "Zero Hour", which was a first-person on-rails shooter that was tailor-made for the gun controller.

== Space Glove ==
A Virtuality data glove peripheral called the "Space Glove" was released in 1991 that could position the user's hands and also provided finger tracking. The glove was capable of measuring one angle of flex for each finger and two angles for the thumb with 12-bit A/D converters. The glove was positioned using a magnetic tracker.

An enhanced version was subsequently released called the "Virtuality Force Feedback Glove" that contained pneumatic actuators delivering tactile feedback such that virtual objects could have a physical presence.

== Mega Visor Display ==
Virtuality partnered with Sega on the Japanese VR-1 virtual reality theme park attraction in 1994, producing the "Mega Visor Display" headset (unrelated to the Sega VR headset), which was first released at Joypolis in Yokohama. The headset had a resolution of 756x244 pixels with a field of view of 60 degrees horizontal and 47 degrees vertical, with a weight of 640 grams.

Virtuality co-developed the VR arcade game Netmerc (also known as TecWar) with Sega in 1994 for Sega's Model 1 hardware which also used the Mega Visor Display, although few cabinets were ever produced. This was a first-person shooting title where the player glides through various environments firing a machine gun at mecha style robots and other enemies.

== Jaguar VR Headset ==
In 1994 Virtuality was commissioned by Atari Corporation to develop a VR headset for the Jaguar video game console. A prototype version was produced by 1995 and expected to be on sale by Christmas of that year however the device was never commercially released.

The headset was capable of tracking based on an infra-red signal received from a base station with at least a 120 degree field of view. Connections were included with the future intent of adding additional base stations for the full 360 degrees. At least one game title was produced by Virtuality for the peripheral, which was a VR version of Missile Command and a demonstration version of Zone Hunter was shown working.

The unused Jaguar VR technology was sold to two companies. The Japanese toy manufacturer Takara released the Dynovisor TAK-8510 headset. A headset was released in August 1998 by Philips as the Scuba Visor. Both companies combined sold more than 160,000 headsets.

== Project Elysium ==
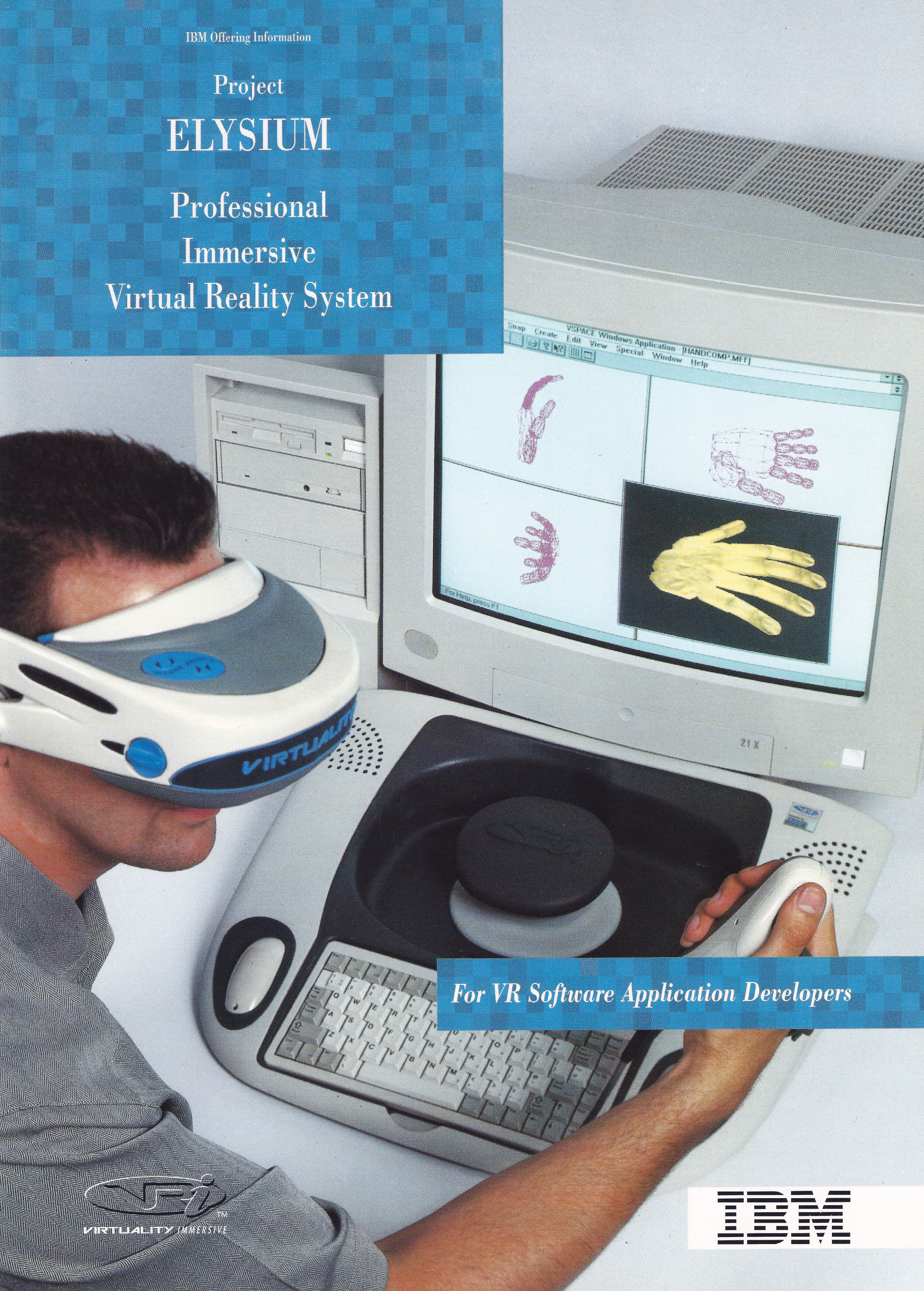
Cover page from an informational brochure for Virtuality's Project Elysium

Virtuality applied their technology to non-gaming use cases. Project Elysium was a virtual reality system developed by Virtuality for IBM for use in architectural, medical and educational markets. The system, released in July 1994, included a visette (headset) and hand-held control device called the V-Flexor.
