= Atari Panther =

Cancelled video game console

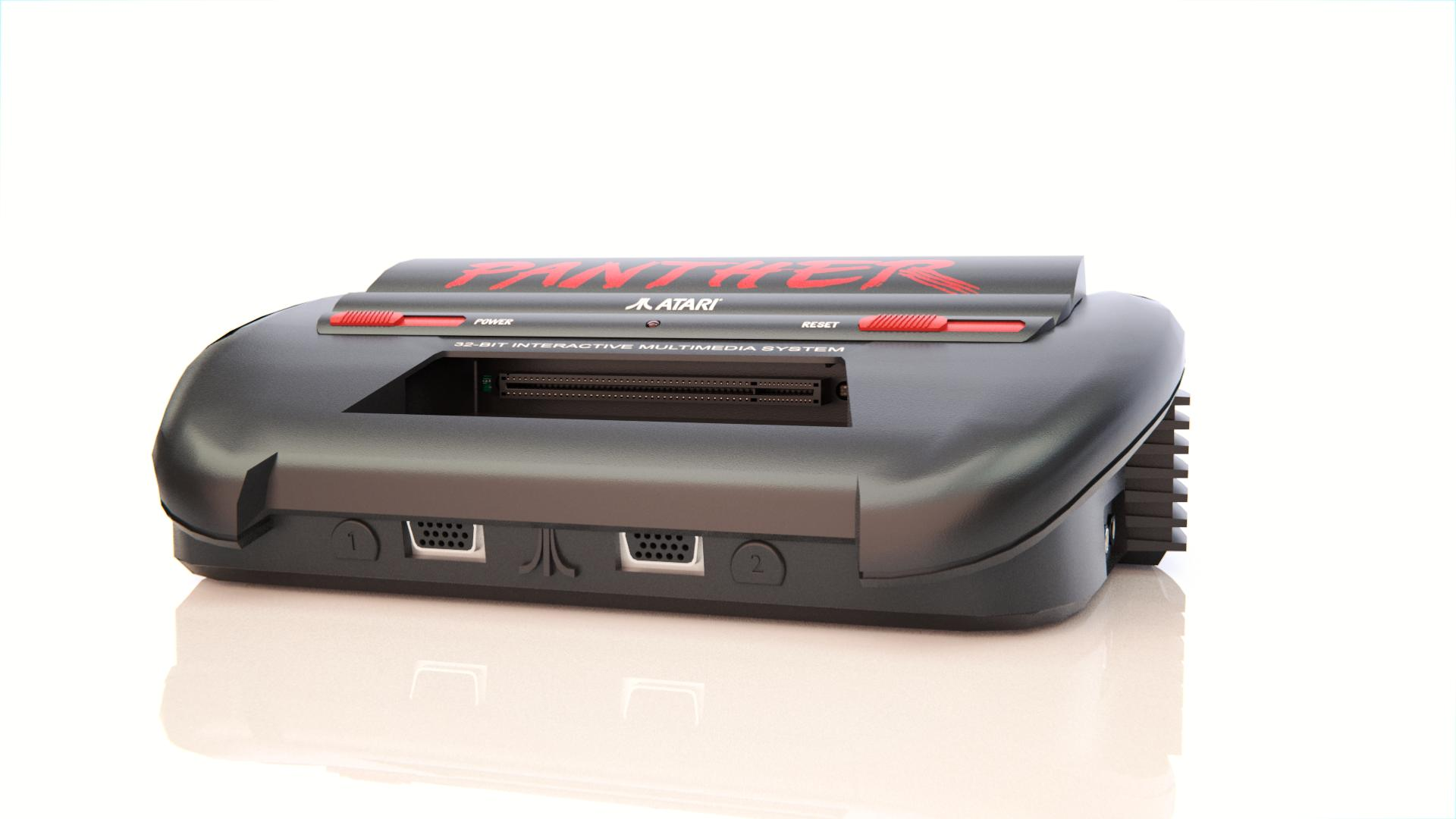
- Unofficial 3D model
- Developer: Atari Corporation
- Type: Home video game console
- Generation: Fourth
- Released: Canceled
- Media: Cartridge
- CPU: 68000
- Graphics: Panther
- Predecessor: Atari 7800, XEGS
- Successor: Jaguar

Atari Panther was the codename for a cancelled video game console from Atari Corporation planned as the successor to the Atari 7800 and the Atari XEGS. It was developed by Flare Technology, the same ex-Sinclair team who worked on the cancelled Flare One and Konix Multisystem consoles. It was planned to be a 16-bit console and was slated at one point to be 32-bit.

Work started in 1988 with a planned 1991 release to compete with the Super Nintendo Entertainment System and the Sega Genesis. The Panther was never commercially released as the design was abandoned for the Atari Jaguar.

== Hardware ==
The system has three primary chips:

1. A Motorola 68000 running at 16 MHz
2. An object processor called the "Panther"
3. An Ensoniq sound processor, nicknamed "Otis", with 32 channels (presumably an ES5505)
