= Konix Multisystem =

Cancelled video game system

- Manufacturer: Konix
- Type: Video game console
- Released: Presented in 1989, cancelled
- CPU: 16-bit 8086 processor @ 6 MHz
- Memory: 128 to 768 KB
- Removable storage: 880KB 3.5" floppy disk, Cartridge
- Graphics: Custom blitter; 4096 colours; Resolutions: 256×200 (256 colours), 512×200 (16 colours), 256×200 (16 colours)
- Sound: Custom RISC-based DSP, 8 channel stereo
- Related: Atari Jaguar

The Konix Multisystem was a cancelled video game system under development by Konix, a British manufacturer of computer peripherals.

== Initial concept ==
The Multisystem began life in 1988 as an advanced Konix peripheral design intended to build on the success of the company's range of joysticks. The design, codenamed Slipstream, resembled a dashboard-style games controller, and could be configured with a steering wheel, a flight yoke, and motorbike handles. It promised advanced features such as force feedback, hitherto unheard of in home gaming.

However, it soon became apparent that the Slipstream project had the potential to be much more than a peripheral. Konix turned to their sister company Creative Devices Ltd, a computer hardware developer, to design a gaming computer to be put inside the controller to make it a stand-alone console in its own right.

== Flare Technology ==
It was shortly after this development began that Konix founder and chairman Wyn Holloway came across a magazine article that described the work of a British group of computer hardware designers whose latest design was looking for a home.

The article in question, published in issue 10 of ACE magazine in July 1988, featured Flare Technology, a group of computer hardware designers who, having split from Sinclair Research (creators of the ZX81 and ZX Spectrum home computers), had built on their work on Sinclair's aborted Loki project to create a system known as Flare One.

Flare's prototype system was Z80 based but featured four custom chips to give it the power to compete with peers such as the Amiga and Atari ST. The 1MB machine (128k of ROM, 128k of video RAM, 768k of system RAM) promised graphics with 256 colours on-screen simultaneously, could handle 3 million pixels per second, output 8 channel stereo sound and had a blitter chip that allowed vertical and horizontal hardware scrolling.

Flare were specifically aiming their machine at the gaming market, eschewing such features as 80 column text display (considered the requisite for business applications such as word processing) in favour of faster graphics handling. This meant that in spite of its modest 8-bit CPU the system compared well against the 16-bit machines in the market at the time. It could move sprites and block graphics faster than an Atari ST, and in 256 colours under conditions when the ST would only show 16 colours. It could also draw lines 3 times faster than an Amiga and even handle the maths of 3D models faster than the 32-bit Acorn Archimedes.

In spite of these specifications and bearing in mind their target gaming market, Flare aimed to retail their machine for around £200 (equivalent to £560 in 2025), half of what the Amiga and ST were selling for. Ultimately, Flare's resources to put it into mass production were limited.

== Development ==
Holloway approached Flare and proposed a merger of their respective technologies to create an innovative new kind of gaming console with the computer hardware built into the main controller and in July 1988 a partnership was formed. Development work was carried out by Flare, with assistance from British games programmer Jeff Minter.

Konix wanted the machine to use a 16-bit processor, so the Z80 was removed and replaced with an 8086 processor. They also demanded that the colour palette be expanded to 4096 colours, the same as that of the Amiga. To reduce manufacturing costs, the Flare One's four custom chips were integrated into one large chip. In order to keep the cost of software down, it was decided that the software media would be 3.5” floppy discs rather than ROM cartridges used universally by consoles up to that time.

The embryonic console was revealed to the computing press at a toy fair held at Earls Court Exhibition Centre in February 1989. It boasted market leading performance, MIDI support and revolutionary peripherals including a light gun with recoil action and the Power Chair, a motorised seat designed to reproduce in the home what "sit-in" arcade games such as After Burner and Out Run delivered in the arcades. Another innovative feature was the ability to link two MultiSystems together to allow for head-to-head two player gaming. Release was slated for August that year.

Several games in development had a version produced for the Konix Multisystem, including Vivid Image's Hammerfist.

A redesigned system oriented around a 32-bit processor clocked at 30 MHz with support for CDs exclusively was announced in 1993 in collaboration with TXC.

== Reception and games ==
Despite the impressive specification on paper, the design did suffer from some limitations. Nick Speakman of software developer Binary Designs pointed out that "the custom chips are very powerful, but they require a lot of programming talent to get anything out of them. The screen handling [also] isn't as fast as we anticipated it to be."

Brian Pollock of software publisher Logotron highlighted the limitations caused by the shortage of RAM (kept low to keep prices down), “My only concern is memory, or lack of it. For instance, in the game that I'm writing I am using six-channel FM synthesized sound. Now that takes up a hell of a lot of memory. I couldn't usefully fit any more samples, and that's sad.”

The memory issue was also flagged by Crash magazine, which pointed out that the floppy disk format meant that games had to be loaded into the machine's RAM (originally intended to be 128k) in turn requiring the system to be constantly accessing the disk drive. Konix intended to remedy the problem with RAM upgrade cartridges, provided that the price of RAM fell in the future.

Overall though, programmers received the system positively. Jeff Minter described the controller itself as "superb," while Chris Walsh of Argonaut Games stated that "Polygon based games like Starglider 2 are going to be easy to program. The machine is geared up to rotating masses of vertices at incredible rates." However, of the original Flare One's vertex computation performance, Zarch author David Braben had noted that whilst similar levels of performance might be difficult to achieve on an Archimedes computer, the performance bottlenecks in solid 3D games were actually "scanning databases of shapes and putting polygons on screen".

Numerous game developers were recruited to produce games for the system, including Jeff Minter's Llamasoft, Electronic Arts, Psygnosis, Ocean, Palace and U.S. Gold, with Konix promising 40 games to be available by Christmas. Lucasfilm was mooted as a developer with the possibility of releasing their own branded version of the machine in the US, but nothing was ever confirmed.

Games known to be in development for the system during 1988 included Llamasoft's Attack of the Mutant Camels (as Attack of the Mutant Camels '89), System 3's Last Ninja 2, Vivid Image's Hammerfist, and Logotron's Star Ray. A game called Bikers was to be developed by Argonaut Software to be included as a free game with the system.

== Demise ==
Signs of trouble in the progress to the release of the console did not take long to arrive. By May the release date had slipped from August to October. By October, a first quarter 1990 release was envisaged. The December edition of The Games Machine magazine revealed the scale of the problem. According to company sources, Konix had been on the brink of calling in receivers. Cheques had bounced, employees hadn't been paid and software development had been brought to a halt in mid-October as developers had reached the stage where they could continue no further without a finished machine.

In March 1990 it was revealed that Konix had sold the rights to sell their joystick range in the UK to Spectravision who also manufactured the rival QuickShot joystick range. They had effectively sold off the family silver in order to keep the MultiSystem project alive. Autumn 1990 was to be the new release time.

Eventually, beset by delays and in spite of all of the media coverage and apparent demand for the machine, the project ultimately went under when Konix ran out of cash without a completed system ever being released.

== Legacy ==
After the project was abandoned, Flare Technology began work on a new project, Flare Two, which was eventually bought by Atari and, after further development, formed the basis for the Atari Jaguar game console.

The original Flare One technology was purchased by arcade gambling machine manufacturer Bellfruit for use in their quiz machines. Drivers for these games are also included in the multi emulator MAME.

The Konix Multisystem's design was later released independently by a Chinese company called MSC (MultiSystem China) as the MSC Super MS-200E Multi-System, although this was simply an inexpensive PC games controller, without any special internal hardware.

Video taped footage showing several games being worked on for the system survives. Excerpts from the footage were later issued on the cover disc of issue 8 of Retro Gamer magazine.

A playable version of the unreleased Attack of the Mutant Camels '89 was included in Digital Eclipse's video game compilation Llamasoft: The Jeff Minter Story.

== Specifications ==
- CPU: 16-bit 8086 processor (running at 6 MHz)
- Co-processor: ASIC processor
- RAM: 128K RAM; later it would be upgraded to 256K RAM after complaints from developers. An optional 512K RAM cartridge was considered to boost the total RAM for the machine to 768K.
- Graphics:
  - Custom blitter
  - 4096 colour palette
  - Resolutions:
    - 256×200 (256 colours)
    - 512×200 (16 colours)
    - 256×200 (16 colours)
- Sound:
  - Custom RISC-based DSP
  - Stereo sound
- Storage: Custom 880KB 3.5" disk drive
- Misc: Cartridge expansion slot
