= Atari Jaguar =

Home video game console

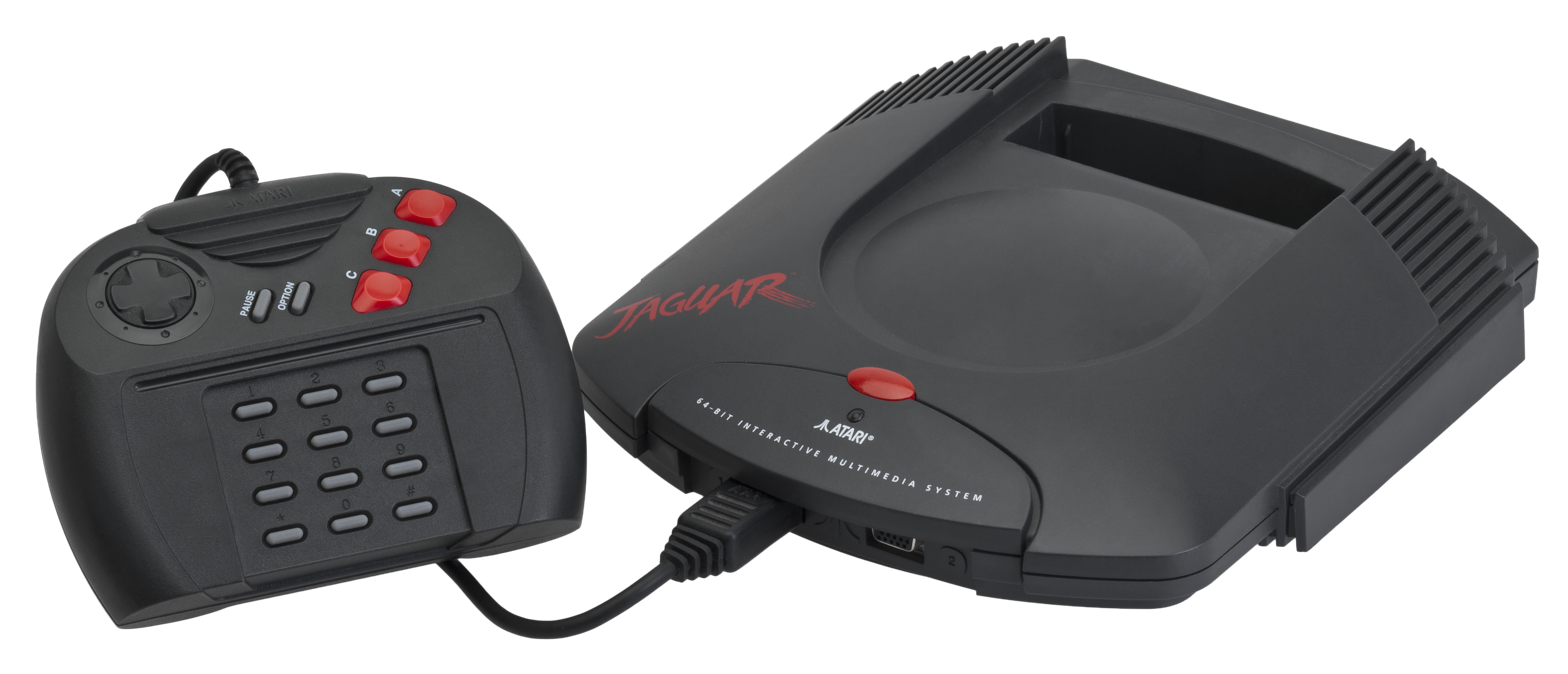
- Jaguar with original PowerPad controller
- Developer: Atari Corporation
- Manufacturer: IBM
- Type: Home video game console
- Generation: Fifth
- Released: NA: November 23, 1993; EU: June 27, 1994; DE: September 1994; JP: December 8, 1994; ESP: April 1995
- Discontinued: 1996
- Units sold: 250,000
- Media: ROM cartridge
- CPU: Motorola 68000 @ 13.295 MHz, 2 custom RISC processors @ 26.591 MHz each
- Memory: 2 MB RAM
- Storage: Internal RAM, cartridge
- Display: Composite, S-Video, RGB, or RF TV out
- Graphics: Tom chip @ 26.591 MHz (32-bit RISC architecture, 4 KB internal RAM)
- Sound: Jerry chip @ 26.591 MHz (16-bit CD-quality stereo sound, two DACs, wavetable and AM synthesis)
- Controller input: PowerPad, Pro Controller
- Best-selling game: Alien vs Predator (52,223)
- Predecessor: 7800; XEGS; Panther (canceled)

The Atari Jaguar is a home video game console developed by Atari Corporation and released in North America in November 1993. Atari marketed it as the world's first 64-bit game system, drawing controversy as some argued that this configuration did not meet the definition of a 64-bit system. The Jaguar launched with Cybermorph as the pack-in game. A total of 63 licensed games (50 on cartridge, 13 on CD-ROM) were released for the system prior to its discontinuation in 1996.

Development started in the early 1990s by Flare Technology, which focused on the system after cancellation of the Panther console. The Jaguar became a more important system for Atari after discontinuing Atari ST computers in favor of consoles. However, game development was complicated by the complex multi-chip architecture, hardware bugs, and poor programming tools. Underwhelming sales further eroded third-party support.

The Jaguar launched as part of the fifth generation of video game consoles, but like other early fifth generation consoles, it struggled to capture major market share from the dominant last generation consoles, the Genesis and Super NES. Atari attempted to extend the system's lifespan by releasing the Jaguar CD add-on, and emphasizing the Jaguar's price, which was over US$100 cheaper than that of its fifth generation competitors, among them the Sega Saturn and Sony PlayStation, which both launched in 1995. However, the Jaguar failed to find its niche. Atari internally abandoned the system by the end of that year, liquidating its inventory by 1996. The commercial failure of the Jaguar prompted Atari to leave the console market and restructure itself as a third-party developer. After Hasbro Interactive acquired all of Atari Corporation's properties, it released the Jaguar patents into the public domain in 1999 and declared it an open platform. Since its discontinuation, the Jaguar has gained a cult following, with new games being released for the system by a homebrew community.

== History ==
=== Development ===
Atari Corporation's previous home video game console, the Atari 7800, was released in 1986. It was considered an "also-ran" and far behind rival Nintendo. Around 1989, development began on a new console leveraging technology from Atari ST computers. It was originally named the Super XE, following the XE Game System, and eventually became the Panther using either 16 or 32-bit architecture. Development also began on a more advanced system, codenamed Jaguar.

Both the Jaguar and Panther were developed by the members of Flare Technology, a company formed by Martin Brennan and John Mathieson. The team had claimed that they could not only make a console superior to the Genesis or the Super NES, but they could also be cost-effective.

Work on the Jaguar design progressed faster than expected, so Atari canceled the Panther project in 1991 to focus on the more promising Jaguar. Rumors were already circulating of a 1992 launch and its 32-bit or even 64-bit architecture. By this time, the Atari ST had long been surpassed in popularity by the Amiga, and Atari and Commodore became victims of Wintel, which became the dominant computer platform. In January 1992, Atari dropped support for their legacy 8-bit products, and ST computers were canceled during the Jaguar's release in 1993.

The Jaguar was unveiled in August 1993 at the Chicago Consumer Electronics Show (CES), and was later showcased during CES 1994 and 1995.

=== Launch ===
The Jaguar was launched on November 23, 1993, at US$249.95 (equivalent to $600 in 2025), under a $500 million manufacturing deal with IBM. The system was initially available only in the test markets of New York City and San Francisco, with the slogan "Get bit by Jaguar", claiming superiority over competing 16-bit and 32-bit systems. During this test launch, Atari sold all units hoping it would rally support for the system. A nationwide release followed six months later, in early 1994. The Jaguar struggled to attain a substantial user base. Atari reported shipping 17,000 units as part of the test market in 1993. By the end of 1994, it reported that it had sold approximately 100,000 units.

Computer Gaming World wrote in January 1994 that the Jaguar was "a great machine in search of a developer/customer base", as Atari had to "overcome the stigma of its name (lack of marketing and customer support, as well as poor developer relations in the past)". Atari had "ventured late into third-party software support" for the Jaguar, but competing console 3DO's "18 month public relations blitz" resulted in "an avalanche of software support". The small size and poor quality of the Jaguar's game library became the most commonly cited reason for tepid adoption, because early releases like Trevor McFur in the Crescent Galaxy, Raiden, and Evolution: Dino Dudes also received poor reviews, the latter two for failing to take full advantage of the Jaguar's hardware. Jaguar eventually earned praise with games such as Tempest 2000, Doom, and Wolfenstein 3D. The most successful game during the Jaguar's first year was Alien vs. Predator. However, these occasional successes were seen as insufficient while the Jaguar's competitors were receiving a continual stream of critically acclaimed software; GamePro concluded its rave review of Alien vs. Predator by remarking "If Atari can turn out a dozen more games like AvP, Jaguar owners could truly rest easy and enjoy their purchase." Next Generation commented that "thus far, Atari has spectacularly failed to deliver on the software side, leaving many to question the actual quality and capability of the hardware. With only one or two exceptions – Tempest 2000 is cited most frequently – there have just been no truly great games for the Jaguar up to now." It further noted that though Atari is well known by older gamers, the company had much less overall brand recognition than Sega, Sony, Nintendo, or even The 3DO Company. However, they argued that with its low price point, the Jaguar might still compete if Atari could improve the software situation.

In Japan, Mumin Corporation distributed the console rather than Atari Japan. Starting in December 1994, Mumin sold the Jaguar at 25 Toys "R" Us locations bundled with Alien vs Predator.

=== Bit-count controversy ===
Atari tried to downplay competing consoles by proclaiming the Jaguar was the only "64-bit" system; in its marketing in the American market the company used the tagline "Do the math!", in reference to the 64 number. This claim was widely derided as misleading, because the Motorola 68000 CPU and the Tom and Jerry coprocessors execute 32-bit instruction sets. Atari's reasoning that the 32-bit Tom and Jerry chips work in tandem to add up to a 64-bit system was ridiculed in a mini-editorial by Electronic Gaming Monthly, which commented that "If Sega did the math for the Sega Saturn the way Atari did the math for their 64-bit Jaguar system, the Sega Saturn would be a 112-bit monster of a machine." Next Generation, in a mostly negative review of the Jaguar, maintained that it is a true 64-bit system, because the data path from the DRAM to the CPU and Tom and Jerry chips is 64 bits wide.

=== Arrival of Saturn and PlayStation ===
In early 1995, Atari announced that it had dropped the price of the Jaguar to US$149.99 (equivalent to $300 in 2025), to be more competitive. Atari ran infomercials with enthusiastic salesmen touting the game system for most of 1995, but did not sell the remaining stock. The major shortcoming of presenting the Jaguar as the low-cost next-generation system was that the Jaguar did not measure up to the other next-generation systems in other respects, and consumers who were simply looking for an inexpensive video game console favored the Super NES and Genesis, since in addition to having a massive selection of games, they were priced at less than $100.

In a 1995 interview with Next Generation, CEO Sam Tramiel declared the Jaguar at least as powerful than the newly launched Saturn, and slightly weaker than the upcoming PlayStation. Next Generation received a deluge of letters in response to Tramiel's comments, particularly his threat to bring Sony to court for price dumping if the PlayStation entered the U.S. market at a retail price below $300. Many readers found this threat hollow and hypocritical, since Tramiel noted in the same interview that Atari was selling the Jaguar at a loss. The editor responded that price dumping does not have to do with a product being priced below cost, but its being priced much lower in one country than another—which, as Tramiel said, is illegal. Tramiel and Next Generation agreed that the PlayStation's Japanese price converts to approximately $500. His remark, that the small number of third party Jaguar games was good for Atari's profitability, angered Jaguar owners already frustrated at the small library.

Atari's 1995 annual report noted:

Jaguar sales were substantially below Atari's expectations, and Atari's business and financial results were materially adversely affected in 1995 as Atari continued to invest heavily in Jaguar game development, entered into arrangements to publish certain licensed titles and reduced the retail price for its Jaguar console unit. Atari attributes the poor performance of Jaguar to a number of factors including (i) extensive delays in development of software for the Jaguar which resulted in reduced orders due to consumer concern as to when titles for the platform would be released and how many titles would ultimately be available, and (ii) the introduction of competing products by Sega and Sony in May 1995 and September 1995, respectively.

In addition, Atari had severely limited financial resources, and so could not create the level of marketing which has historically backed successful gaming consoles.

=== Decline ===
Figures from the NPD Group showed that at the end of year 1995, the Jaguar had statistically a share of zero percent of the "sold through" units (which are systems purchased by consumers) in the 32-bit market, which was also lower than the one percent held by its struggling rival 3DO.

By November 1995, mass layoffs and insider statements were fueling journalistic speculation that Atari had ceased both development and manufacturing for the Jaguar and was simply trying to sell off existing stock before exiting the video game industry. Although Atari continued to deny these theories going into 1996, core Jaguar developers such as High Voltage Software and Beyond Games stated that they were no longer receiving communications from Atari regarding future Jaguar projects.

In its 10-K405 SEC Filing, filed April 12, 1996, Atari informed stockholders that its revenues had declined by more than half, from $38.7 million in 1994 to $14.6 million in 1995, then gave them the news on the truly dire nature of the Jaguar:

From the introduction of Jaguar in late 1993 through the end of 1995, Atari sold approximately 125,000 units of Jaguar. As of December 31, 1995, Atari had approximately 100,000 units of Jaguar in inventory.

The filing confirmed that Atari had abandoned the Jaguar in November 1995 and in the subsequent months was concerned chiefly with liquidating its inventory of Jaguar products. On April 8, 1996, Atari Corporation agreed to merge with JTS, Inc. in a reverse takeover, thus forming JTS Corporation. The merger was finalized on July 30. After the merger, the bulk of Jaguar inventory remained unsold and was finally moved out to Tiger Software, a private liquidator, on December 23, 1996. Telegames continued to publish games for the Jaguar after it was discontinued, and for a time was the only company to do so.

== Technical specifications ==
From the Jaguar Software Reference manual, page 1:

Jaguar is a custom chip set primarily intended to be the heart of a very high-performance games/leisure computer. It may also be used as a graphics accelerator in more complex systems, and applied to workstation and business uses. As well as a general purpose CPU, Jaguar contains four processing units. These are the Object Processor, Graphics Processor, Blitter, and Digital Sound Processor. Jaguar provides these blocks with a 64-bit data path to external memory devices, and is capable of a very high data transfer rate into external dynamic RAM.

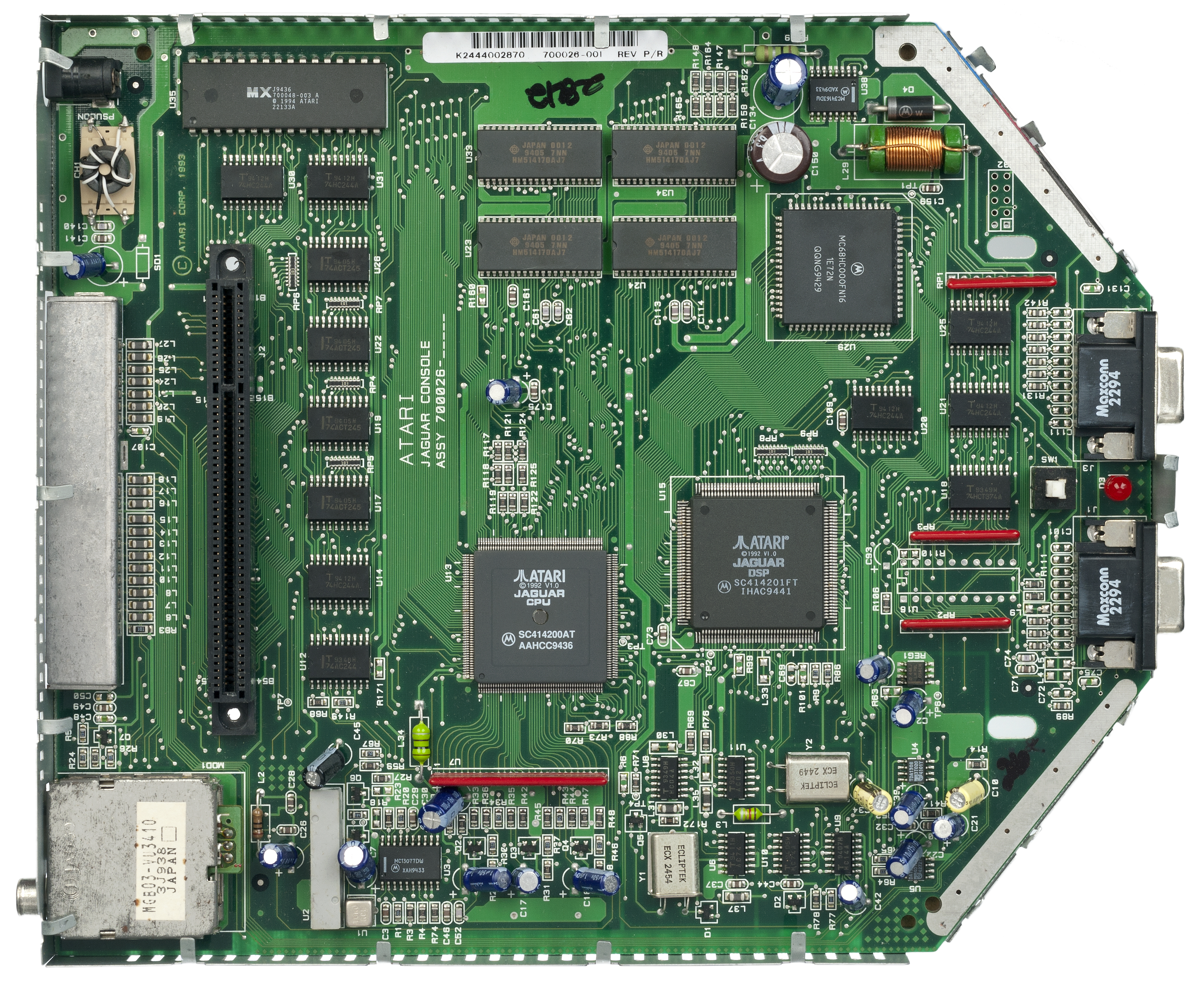
The Jaguar's multi-chip architecture was difficult to use for most contemporary developers.

The Atari Jaguar has a Motorola 68000 CPU and two custom 32-bit coprocessors named Tom and Jerry. Design specs for the console allude to the GPU or DSP being capable of acting as a CPU, leaving the Motorola 68000 to read controller inputs. Atari's Leonard Tramiel also specifically suggested that the 68000 not be used by developers. In practice, however, many developers use the Motorola 68000 to drive gameplay logic due to the greater developer familiarity of the 68000 and the adequacy of the 68000 for certain types of games. Most critically, a flaw in the memory controller means that certain obscure conventions must be followed for the RISC chips to be able to execute code from RAM.

The system is notoriously difficult to program for, because its multi-processor design is complex, development tools were released in an unfinished state, and the hardware has crippling bugs. The Tom and Jerry chips operate independently, and hardware bugs are triggered when software attempts to synchronize those chips. This conflict forced developers to rely on the slower Motorola 68000 CPU to manage data flow, creating a bottleneck that limited the console's performance.

The Jaguar has two distinct versions that are discernable by the first letter of the serial number on the bottom of the system. Most Jaguars have a "K" serial (manufactured by IBM), while others have an "M" serial (manufactured by JVC). Early "K" serial systems have an ADC chip, which supports analog control. Later "K" serial (shown right) and "M" serial systems fixed the crippling hardware bugs found in earlier models but lack the ADC chip as a result of cost-cutting.

=== Processors ===
- Tom chip @ 26.591 MHz
  - Graphics processing unit (GPU) – 32-bit RISC architecture, 4 KB internal RAM, all graphical effects are software-based, with additional instructions intended for 3D operations
  - Object Processor – 64-bit fixed-function video processor with 64-bit internal registers, converts display lists to video output at scan time.
  - Blitter – 64-bit high speed logic operations, z-buffering and Gouraud shading, with 64-bit internal registers.
  - DRAM controller, 8-, 16-, 32- and 64-bit memory management
- Jerry chip @ 26.591 MHz
  - Digital Signal Processor – 32-bit RISC architecture, 8 KB internal RAM
    - Similar RISC core as the GPU, additional instructions intended for audio operations
  - CD-quality sound (16-bit stereo)
    - Number of sound channels limited by software
    - Two DACs (stereo) convert digital data to analog sound signals
    - Full stereo capabilities
  - Wavetable synthesis and AM synthesis
  - A clock control block, incorporating timers, and a UART
  - Joystick control
- Motorola 68000 @ 13.295 MHz
  - General purpose 16-bit control processor with 32-bit wide registers, "used as a manager"

=== Other features ===
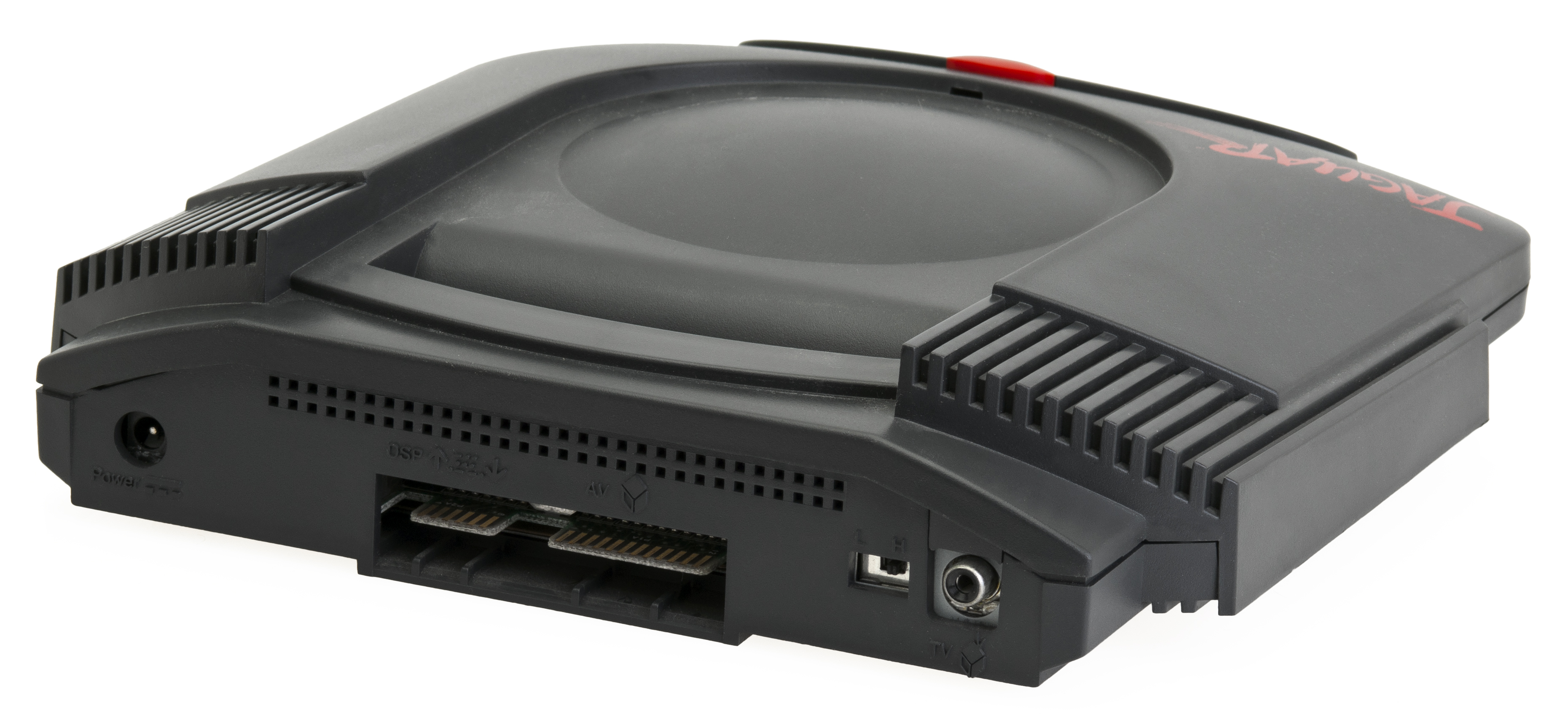
The inputs and outputs of an NTSC Jaguar

- RAM: 2 MB on a 64-bit bus using 4 16-bit fast-page-mode DRAMs (80 ns)
- Storage: ROM cartridges – up to 6 MB
- ADC chip - allows for analog control, only found in early "K" models
- DSP-port (JagLink)
- Monitor-port (composite/S-Video/RGB) - proprietary connector
- Antenna-port (UHF/VHF) - fixed at 591 MHz in Europe; not present on French model
- Support for ComLynx I/O
- NTSC/PAL machines can be identified by their power LED colour, Red: NTSC; Green: PAL.

=== Atari CoJag ===
Atari Games licensed the Jaguar's chipset for use in its arcade games. The system, named CoJag (for "Coin-Op Jaguar"), replaced the 68000 with a 68020 or MIPS R3000-based CPU (depending on the board version), added more RAM, a full 64-bit wide ROM bus (Jaguar ROM bus is 32-bit), and optionally a hard drive (some games such as Freeze are ROM only). It runs the lightgun games Area 51 and Maximum Force, which were released as dedicated cabinets or as the Area 51 and Maximum Force combo machine. Other games were developed but never released: 3 On 3 Basketball, Fishin' Frenzy, Freeze, and Vicious Circle.

== Peripherals ==
Prior to the launch of the console in November 1993, Atari had announced a variety of peripherals to be released over the console's lifespan. This included a CD-ROM-based console, dial-up Internet access with support for online games, a virtual reality headset, and an MPEG-2 video card. However, due to the poor sales and eventual commercial failure of the Jaguar, most of the peripherals in development were canceled. The only peripherals and add-ons released by Atari for the Jaguar are a redesigned controller, an adapter for four players, a CD console add-on, and a link cable for local area network (LAN) gaming.

=== Controllers ===
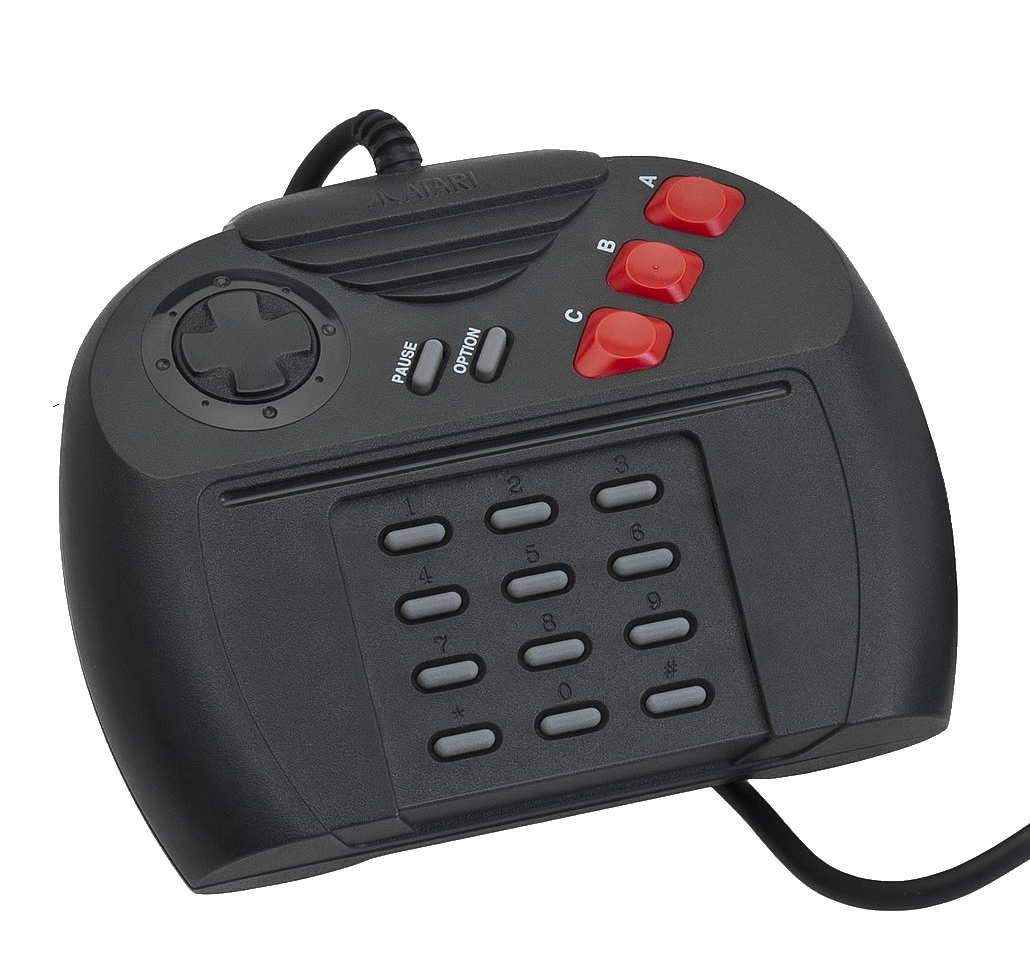
Original PowerPad Controller

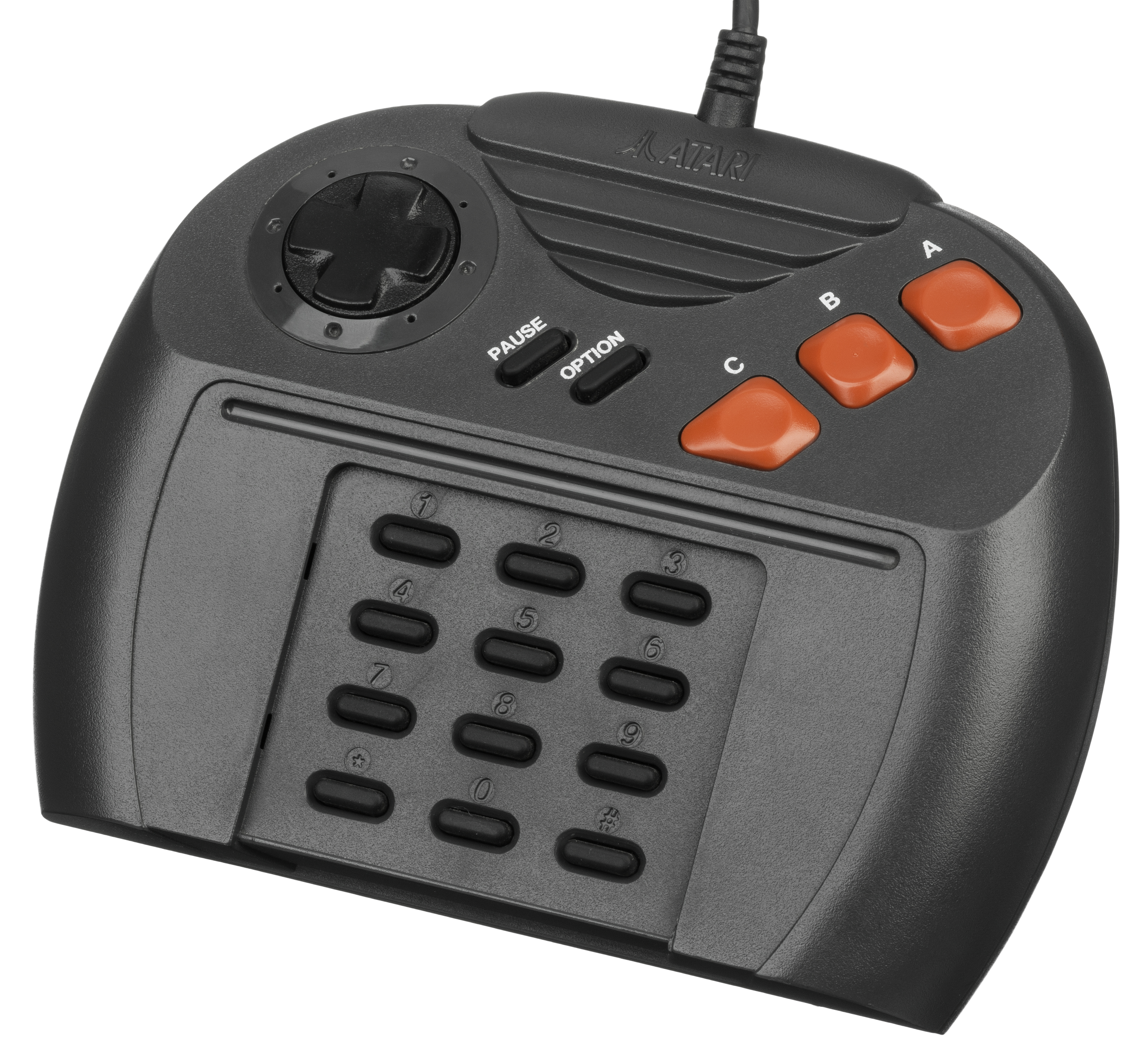
Revised PowerPad Controller

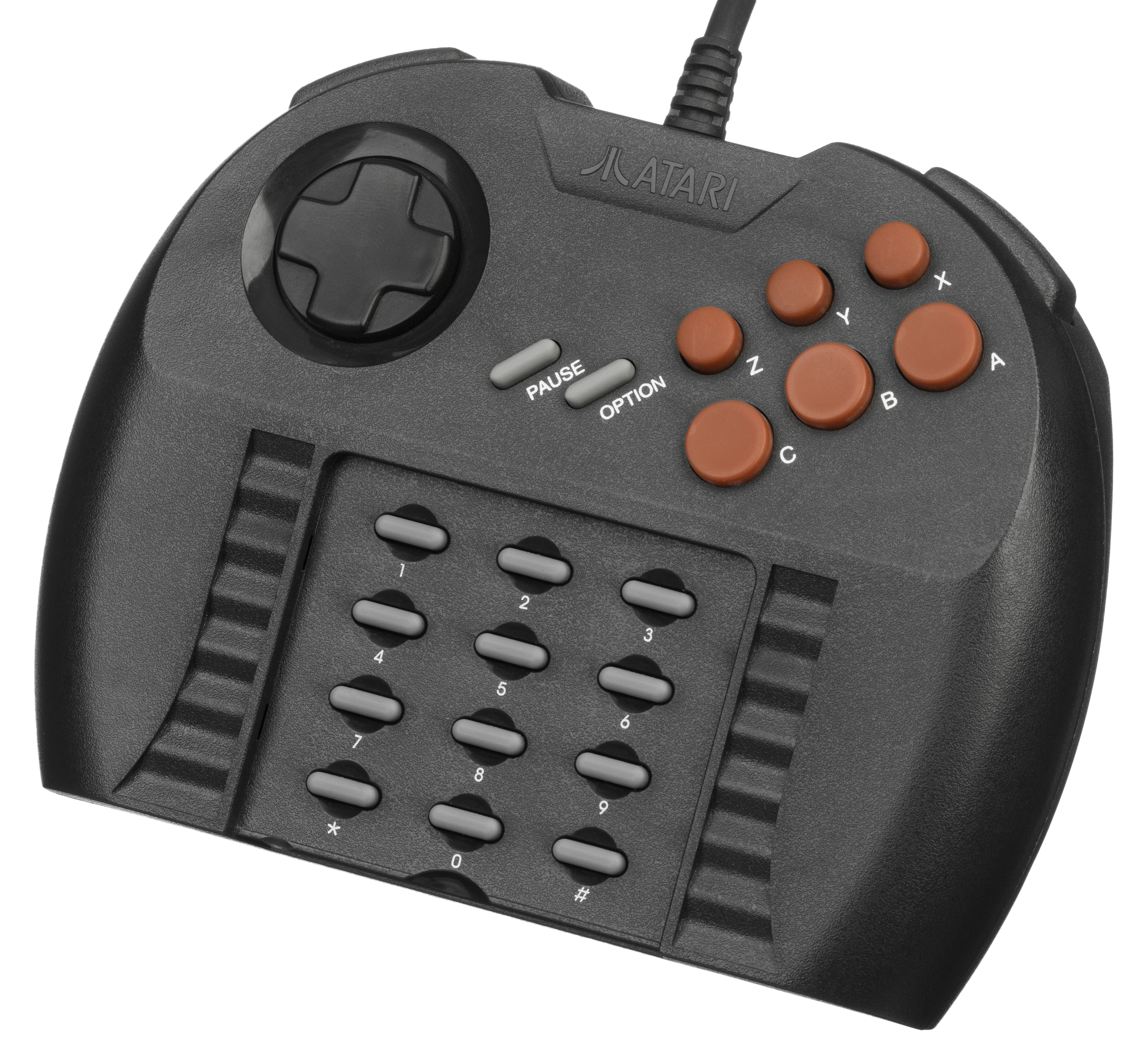
Redesigned Pro Controller

The Jaguar was bundled with one controller, the PowerPad. It is a 17-button controller with three face buttons, a 12-button keypad, pause and option buttons, and a directional pad. Many games released for the system utilize the keypad to add extra functionality and gameplay elements, such as quickly selecting weapons in Doom, and quicksaving in Wolfenstein 3D. Plastic overlays can be slotted over the keypad in order to better label what each button does in specific games.

To cut costs later on in the Jaguar's life, Atari released a slightly revised version of the PowerPad controller. Notable differences between this version and the original are a thinner cord, black buttons instead of gray, and a cheapened, internally-simplified directional pad. The connector that plugs into the console also has fewer pins that connect compared to the original.

Later on in the system's life, Atari released a second controller, the Pro Controller, which added three more face buttons and two triggers, and lengthened the wire that connects to the console. It was created in response to the criticism of the original controller, said to lack enough buttons for fighting games in particular. It was never bundled with the system and was only sold separately.

=== Multiplayer ===
The Team Tap multitap adds 4-controller support, compatible only with the optionally bundled White Men Can't Jump and NBA Jam Tournament Edition. Eight player gameplay with two Team Taps is possible but not supported by either of the compatible games. For LAN multiplayer support, the Jaglink Interface links two Jaguar consoles through a modular extension and a UTP phone cable. It is compatible with three games: Doom, AirCars, and BattleSphere.

=== Jaguar CD ===
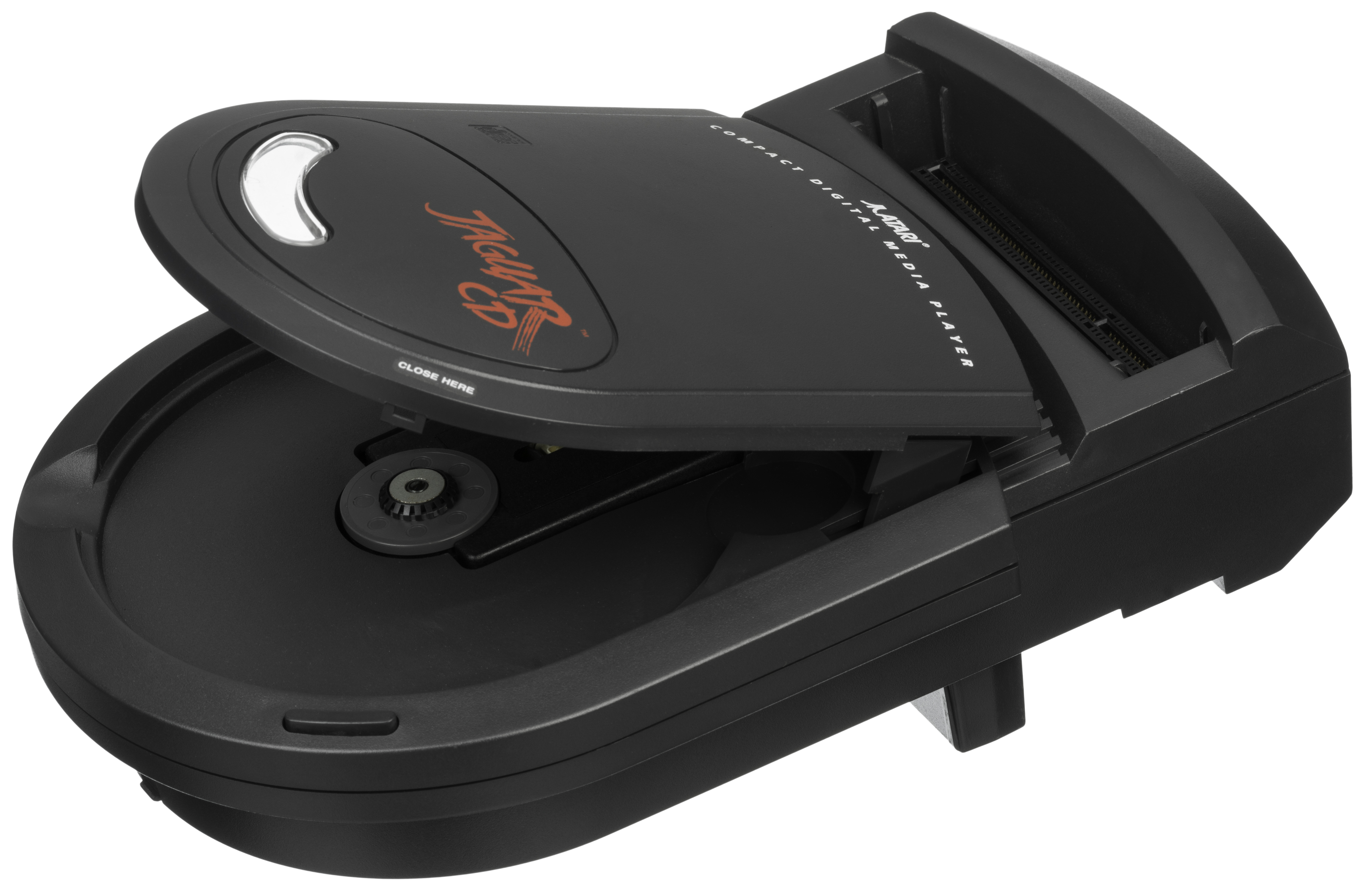
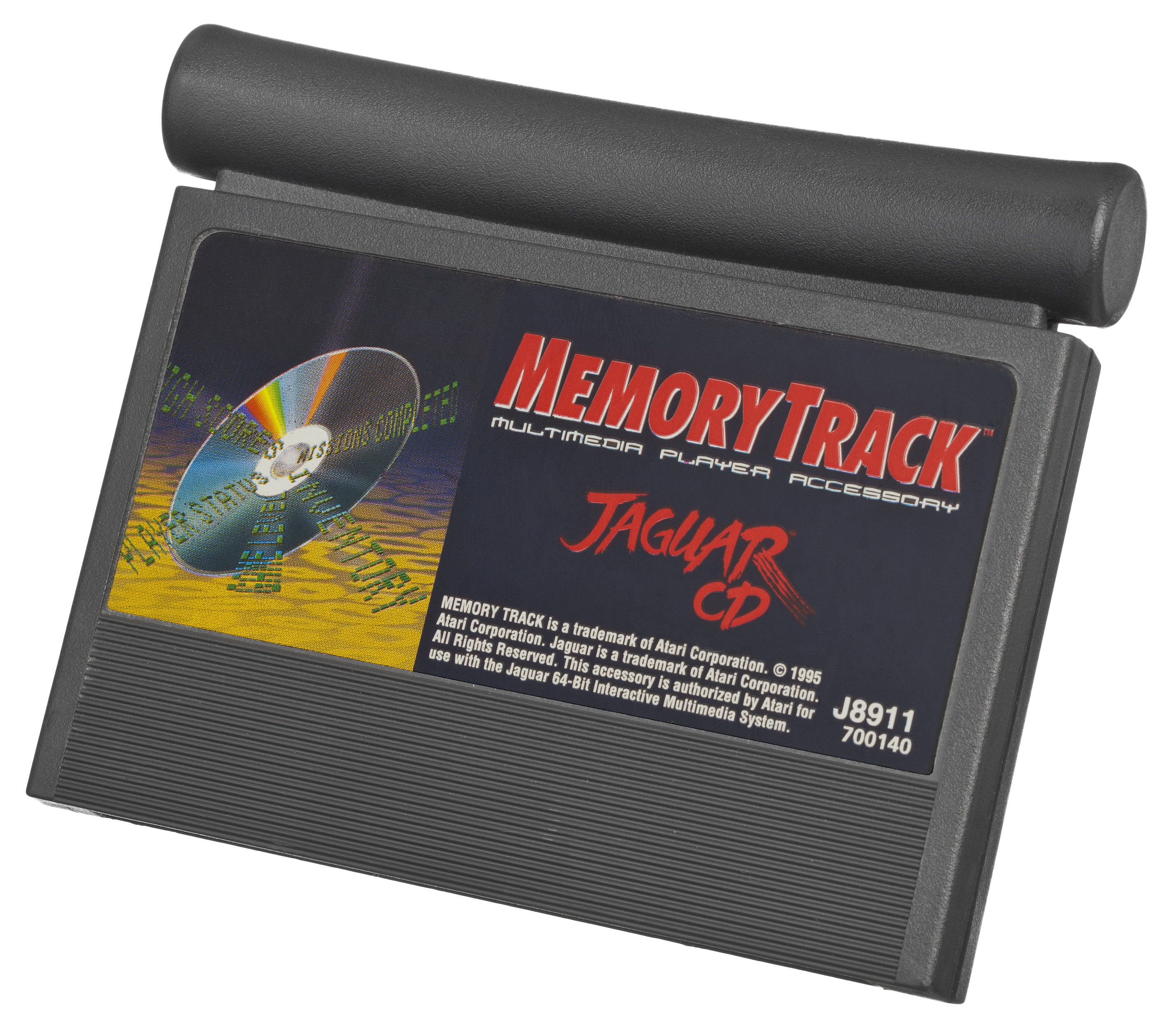
The Jaguar CD and Memory Track cartridge

The Jaguar CD is a CD-ROM peripheral for games. It was released in September 1995, two years after the Jaguar's launch. Eleven CD games were released for the Jaguar CD during its manufacturing lifetime, with more being made later by homebrew developers. Each Jaguar CD unit has a Virtual Light Machine, which displays light patterns corresponding to music, if the user inserts an audio CD into the console. It was developed by Jeff Minter, after experimenting with graphics during the development of Tempest 2000. The program was deemed a spiritual successor to the Atari Video Music, a visualizer released in 1976.

The Memory Track is a cartridge accessory for the Jaguar CD, providing Jaguar CD games with 128 K EEPROM for persistent storage of data such as preferences and saved games. The Jaguar Duo (codenamed Jaguar III) was a proposal to integrate the Jaguar CD to make a new console, a concept similar to the TurboDuo and Genesis CDX. A prototype, described by journalists as resembling a bathroom scale, was unveiled at the 1995 Winter Consumer Electronics Show, but the console was canceled before production.

=== Unlicensed peripherals ===
An unofficial expansion peripheral for the Jaguar dubbed the "Catbox" was released by the Rockford, Illinois company ICD. It was originally slated to be released early in the Jaguar's life, in the second quarter of 1994, but was not actually released until mid-1995. The ICD CatBox plugs directly into the AV/DSP connectors located in the rear of the Jaguar console and provides three main functions. These are audio, video, and communications. It features six output formats, three for audio (Line level stereo, RGB monitor, headphone jack with volume control) and three for video (composite, S-Video, and RGB analog component video) making the Jaguar compatible with multiple high quality monitor systems and multiple monitors at the same time. It is capable of communications methods known as CatNet and RS-232 and DSP pass through, allowing the user to connect two or more Jaguars together for multiplayer games either directly or with modems. The ICD CatBox features a polished stainless steel casing and red LEDs in the jaguar's eyes on the logo that indicate communications activity. An IBM AT-type null modem cable may be used to connect two Jaguars together. The CatBox is also compatible with Atari's Jaglink Interface peripheral.

=== Jaguar VR ===
A virtual reality headset compatible with the console, tentatively titled the Jaguar VR, was unveiled by Atari at the 1995 Winter Consumer Electronics Show. The development of the peripheral was a response to Nintendo's tabletop portable console, the Virtual Boy, which had been announced the previous year. The headset was developed in cooperation with Virtuality, which had previously created many virtual reality arcade systems, and was already developing a similar headset for practical purposes, named Project Elysium, for IBM. The peripheral was targeted for a commercial release before Christmas 1995. However, the deal with Virtuality was abandoned in October 1995. After Atari's merger with JTS in 1996, all prototypes of the headset were allegedly destroyed. However, two working units, one low-resolution prototype with red and grey-colored graphics and one high-resolution prototype with blue and grey-colored graphics, have since been recovered, and are regularly showcased at retrogaming-themed conventions and festivals. Only one game was developed for the Jaguar VR prototype: a 3D-rendered version of the 1980 arcade game Missile Command, titled Missile Command 3D. A demo of Virtuality's Zone Hunter was created.

In 2022, developer Rich Whitehouse released BigPEmu, the first emulator to run the Jaguar's entire library, and in 2023 updated it to run Jaguar VR games on modern headsets after he reverse-engineered the communication protocols from Missile Command 3D.

=== Modem ===
At CES 1994, Atari announced that it had partnered with Phylon to create the Jaguar Voice/Data Communicator. The unit was delayed. An estimated 100 units were produced, but in 1995, it was canceled. The Jaguar Voice Modem or JVM utilizes a 19.9 kbit/s dial up modem to answer incoming phone calls and store up to 18 phone numbers. Players directly dial each other for online play, only compatible with Ultra Vortek.

== Game library ==
The small size and poor quality of the Jaguar's game library became the most commonly cited reason for its failure in the marketplace. The pack-in game Cybermorph was one of the first polygon-based games for consoles, but was criticized for design flaws and a weak color palette, and compared unfavorably with the SNES's Star Fox. Other early releases like Trevor McFur in the Crescent Galaxy, Raiden, and Evolution: Dino Dudes also received poor reviews, the latter two for failing to take full advantage of the Jaguar's hardware. The Jaguar did eventually earn praise with games such as Tempest 2000, Doom and Wolfenstein 3D. The most successful title during the Jaguar's first year was Alien vs. Predator. However, these occasional successes were seen as insufficient, while the Jaguar's competitors were receiving a continual stream of critically acclaimed software; GamePro concluded its rave review of Alien vs. Predator by remarking: "If Atari can turn out a dozen more games like AvP, Jaguar owners could truly rest easy and enjoy their purchase." In a late 1995 review of the Jaguar, Game Players remarked: "The Jaguar suffers from several problems, most importantly the lack of good software." Next Generation likewise commented that "thus far, Atari has spectacularly failed to deliver on the software side, leaving many to question the actual quality and capability of the hardware. With only one or two exceptions – Tempest 2000 is cited most frequently – there have just been no truly great games for the Jaguar up to now." They further noted that though Atari is well known by older gamers, the company had much less overall brand recognition than Sega, Sony, Nintendo, or even The 3DO Company. However, they argued that with its low price point, the Jaguar might still compete if Atari could improve the software situation. They gave the system two out of five stars. Game Players also stated though it is 64-bit, the Jaguar is much less powerful than the 3DO, Saturn, and PlayStation, even when supplemented with the Jaguar CD. With such a small library of games to challenge the incumbent 16-bit game consoles, the Jaguar's appeal never grew beyond a small gaming audience. Digital Spy commented: "Like many failed hardware ventures, it still maintains something of a cult following but can only be considered a misstep for Atari."

== Reception ==
Reviewing the Jaguar just a few weeks prior to its launch, GamePro gave it a "thumbs sideways". They praised the power of the hardware but criticized the controller, and were dubious of how the software lineup would turn out, commenting that Atari's failure to secure support from key third party publishers such as Capcom was a bad sign. They concluded: "Like the 3DO, the Jaguar is a risky investment – just not quite as expensive."

The Jaguar won GameFan's "Best New System" award for 1993.

In 2006, IGN editor Craig Harris rated the original Jaguar controller as the worst game controller ever, criticizing the unwarranted recycling of the 1980s "phone keypad" format and the small number of action buttons, which he found particularly unwise given that Atari was actively trying to court fighting game fans to the system. In an overview of the Jaguar's launch, Andrew McNamara of Game Informer said that the controller "is better than we suspected, but is still behind the times", arguing that by this time a controller with at least six action buttons was essential, if not as a pack-in, then at least as a peripheral available at launch. Ed Semrad of Electronic Gaming Monthly commented that many Jaguar games gratuitously used all of the controller's phone keypad buttons, making the controls much more difficult than they needed to be. GamePro's The Watch Dog remarked: "The controller usually doesn't use the keypad, and for games that use the keypad extensively (Alien vs. Predator, Doom), a keypad overlay is used to minimize confusion. But yes, it is a lot of buttons for nuttin'." Atari added more action buttons for its Pro Controller, to improve performance in fighting games in particular.

== Legacy ==
On March 16, 1998, two years after the Jaguar's discontinuation, Hasbro Interactive acquired all of Atari's assets after buying out JTS for $5 million. On May 14, 1999, Atari fans successfully lobbied Hasbro to release the Jaguar's patents and rights into the public domain, transforming the console into an open game development platform and allowing software developers to make games for it without a licensing agreement. Jayson Hill, former public relations manager for Hasbro, hoped that fans would appreciate Hasbro getting the Jaguar into the public domain. Since its discontinuation, the Jaguar has gained a cult following and continues to receive support from a homebrew community.

In the United Kingdom in 2001, Telegames and retailer Game made a deal to bring the Jaguar to Game's retail outlets. It was initially sold for £29.99 new and software ranged between £9.99 for more common games such as Doom and Ruiner Pinball and £39.99 for rarer releases such as Defender 2000 and Checkered Flag. The machine had a presence in the stores until 2007, when remaining consoles were sold off for £9.99 and games were sold for as low as 97p.

The console's complex architecture obstructed accurate emulation and homebrew development for decades. In 2022, the compilation Atari 50 was released with a collection of Jaguar games, as one of the first instances of Jaguar software being officially re-released by Atari. Due to the unique design of the original Jaguar controller, the games feature reworked control layouts to allow them to work with modern hardware. That same year, developer Rich Whitehouse released BigPEmu, the first emulator to run the entire Jaguar library, and in 2023 this included Jaguar VR games on modern headsets.

=== Molds ===
In 1997, Steve Mortensen, a developer of dental imaging equipment, purchased the Jaguar cartridge and console factory molds, including the molds for the CD add-on, from JTS. With minor modification, they fit its HotRod camera, and the cartridge molds were reused to create an optional memory expansion card. In a retrospective, Imagin founder Steve Mortenson praised the design, but admitted that their device came at the time of the dental industry's transition to USB, and apart from a few prototypes, the molds went unused.

In December 2014, the molds were purchased from Imagin Systems by Mike Kennedy, owner of the Kickstarter funded Retro Videogame Magazine, to propose a new crowdfunded video game console, the Retro VGS, later rebranded the Coleco Chameleon with a licensing agreement with Coleco. The purchase of the molds was far cheaper than designing and manufacturing entirely new molds, and Kennedy described their acquisition as "the entire reason [the Retro VGS] is possible". However, the project was terminated in March 2016 following criticism of Kennedy and doubts regarding demand for the proposed console. Two "prototypes" were discovered to be fakes and Coleco withdrew from the project. After the project's termination, the molds were sold to Albert Yarusso, the founder of the AtariAge website.

== See also ==
- Contiki, portable operating system, including GUI, TCP/IP, and web browser for the Jaguar
