= Varuna's Forces =

- Splash screen from the unreleased 3DO version
- Developer: Accent Media Productions
- Publishers: Atari Corporation (Jaguar CD); JVC (3DO, Dreamcast, PC, Saturn)
- Producer: Paul Fullwood
- Designer: Mike Montague
- Programmer: Eric Adem
- Platforms: 3DO, Atari Jaguar CD, Dreamcast, PC, PlayStation, Sega Saturn
- Release: Unreleased
- Genres: First-person shooter, rail shooter, real-time strategy
- Mode: Single-player

Varuna's Forces is an unreleased sci-fi video game that was in development by Accent Media Productions and planned to be published by Atari Corporation for the Atari Jaguar CD and JVC for 3DO Interactive Multiplayer, Dreamcast, PC, PlayStation and Sega Saturn.

Assuming command of four soldiers from the eight-man Marine Attack Division team of the United Coalition of Planets, the player would have the choice of selecting a number of scenarios, each one featuring a different set of objectives to successfully complete by taking advantage of the unique attributes that each member of the team has to do so. Varuna's Forces was being created by the same company who previously developed titles for the Philips CD-i based on both The Joker's Wild and Jeopardy! TV game shows. It also stars Michael Clarke Duncan in one of his first video game roles along with Panic in the Park, among other actors that were involved in the production of the project prior to its cancellation.

The Jaguar CD version of Varuna's Forces was slated to be published in late 1995. However, along with the 3DO version, the Jaguar version was never released; this was due to discontinuation of both platforms. The Saturn version was slated to be released around summer 1996, but this version was later discontinued and development was transferred to the Dreamcast instead; the Dreamcast version would later be cancelled due to the system being discontinued. The PC version remained into development until JVC ran into financial difficulties that left AMP without funds to continue with the project, ultimately ceasing development of Varuna's Forces and leaving it unfinished as a result.

== Gameplay ==
Gameplay screenshot from the beta build of the 3DO version.

Varuna's Forces is a hybrid rail shooter/third-person shooter game with strategy elements, where the player assume role of a Maverick Assault commander, taking control of either one or four soldiers from the eight-man Marine Attack Division team of the United Coalition of Planets, which are nicknamed as with the game's main title. Before starting, a mission briefing cutscene is played and showcases the location where the mission takes place, the main objectives to complete and enemies to eradicate, among other elements. The game's missions would have varied from hostage rescue, to reconnaissance and capturing the enemy base, etc. Once the player is ready to begin, they are launched into the planet where the mission takes place on the Maverick craft, starting the rail shooter segment, which are pre-rendered fractal terrains and the player must shoot upcoming enemies before landing on a set location of the planet, similar to Psygnosis' 1994 Novastorm. After the rail shooter section is over, the first-person shooter section starts, and the player must manage the team and plan their movements in order to successfully complete the objective within the set time limit, which are reminiscent of Electronic Arts' 1993 real-time tactical game Space Hulk.

=== Soldiers ===
Each member of the team has their own set of skills and attributes that can be taken advantage of to complete the missions, however, the soldiers also have their own quirks that the player must be aware during the mission such as a sudden change in behavior:

- William Kunkel
- Andrew Ozuna
- Tom Burnet
- Julie Makela
- Joshua Carson
- Dana Palmer
- Michael Henley
- Carl Tomas (Played by Michael Clarke Duncan)

== History ==
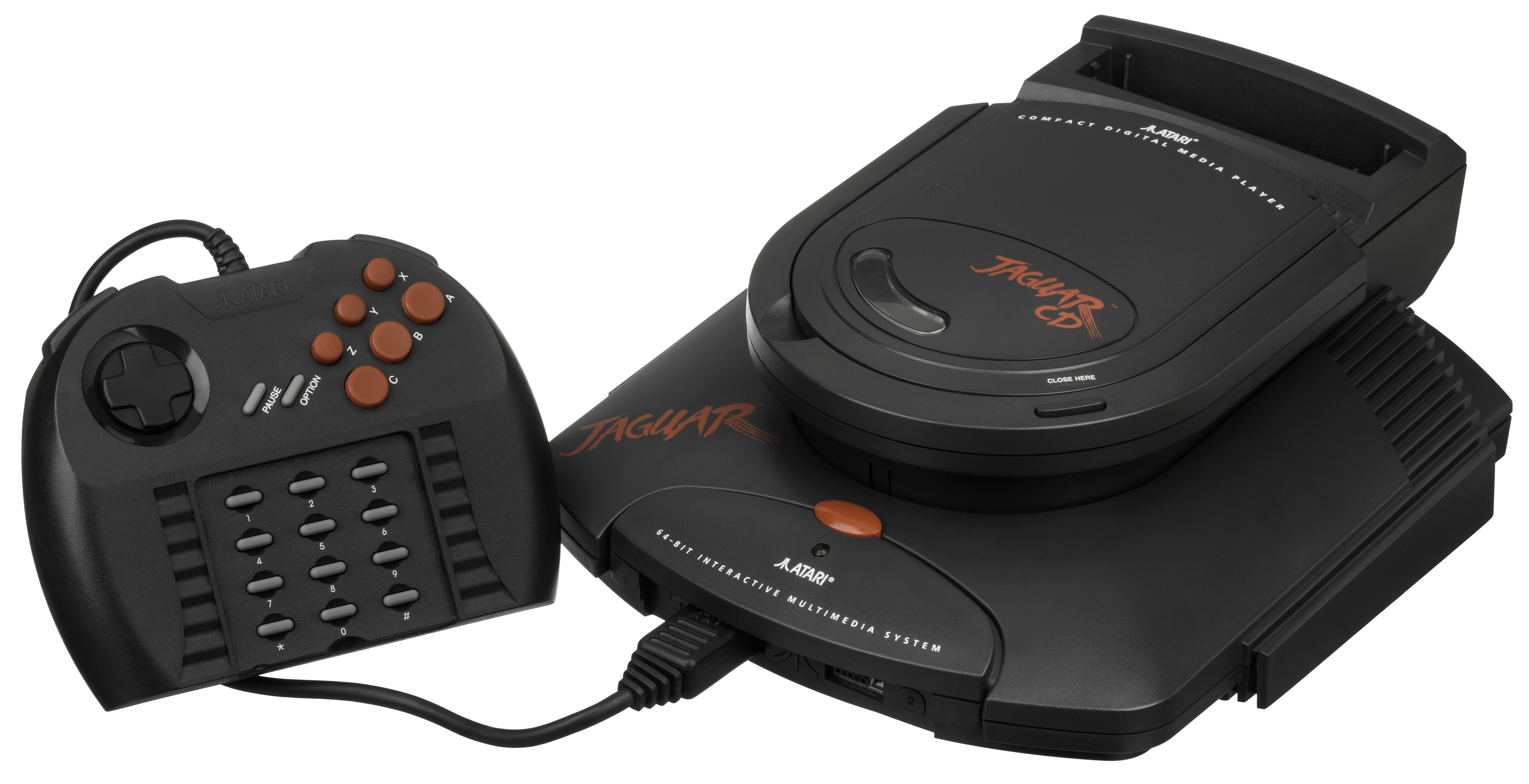
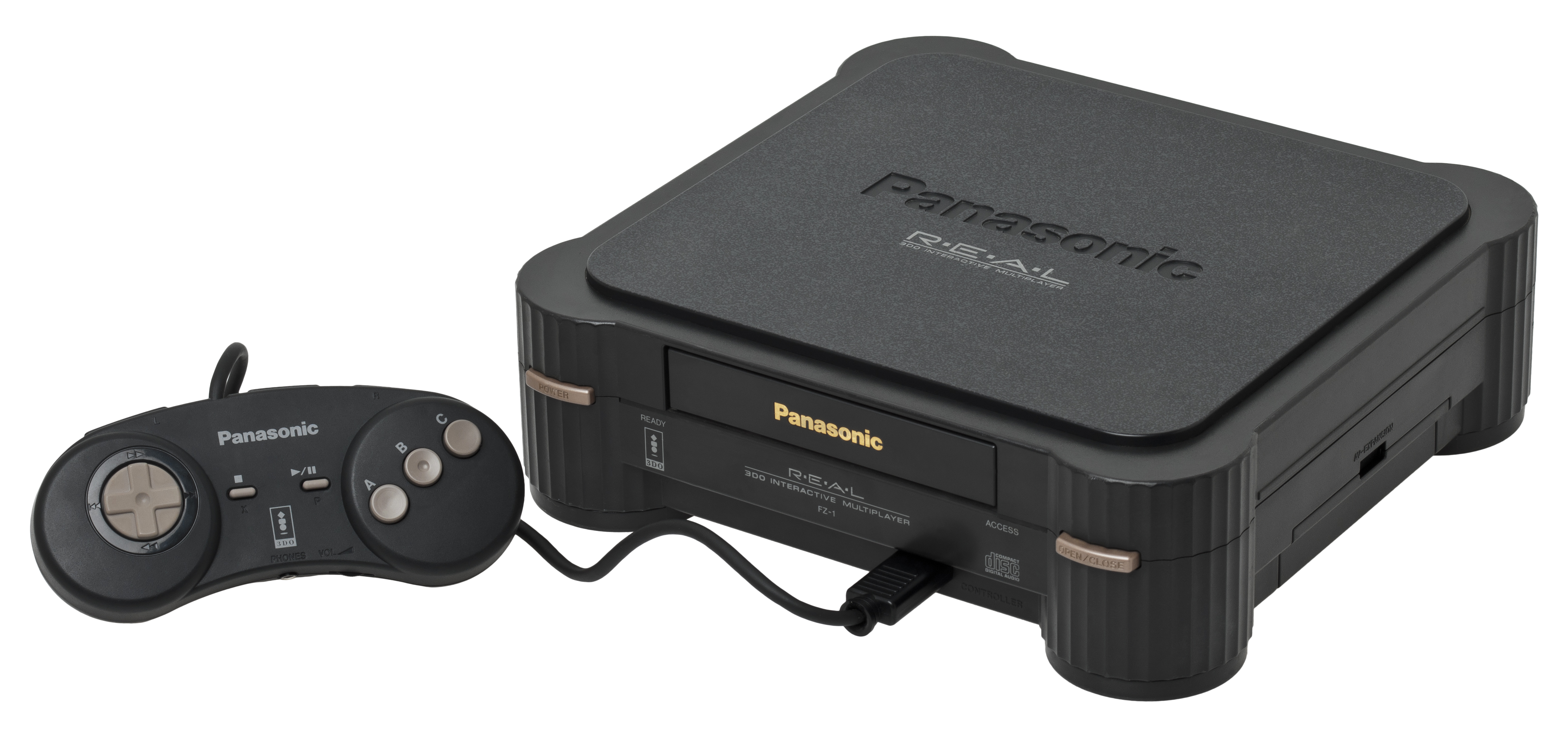

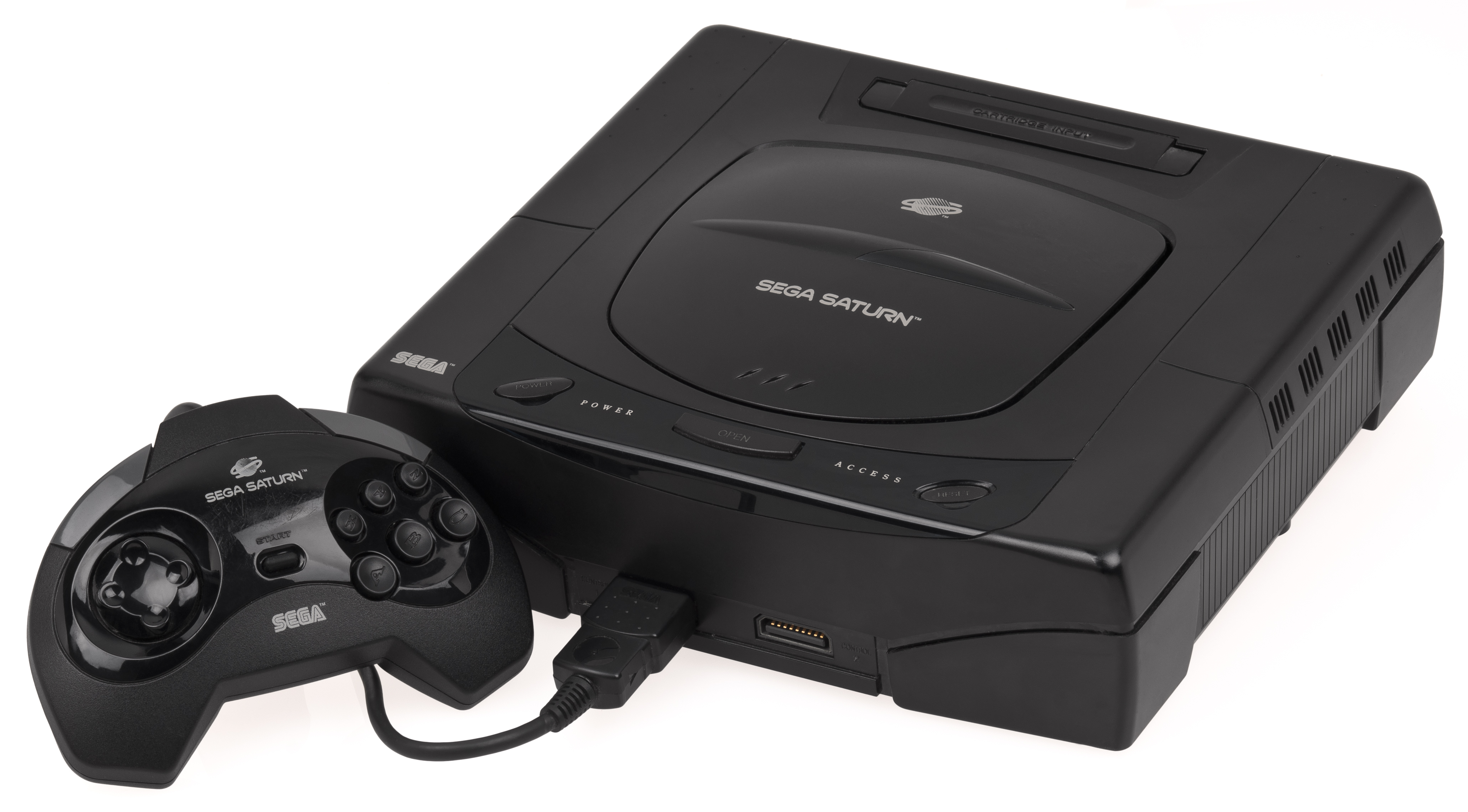
Initially announced for the Atari Jaguar CD, development of Varuna's Forces was later spawned across multiple systems such as the 3DO Interactive Multiplayer and Sega Saturn, with neither platform receiving the title.

Varuna's Forces was first announced for the Jaguar CD and displayed to the public at Atari Corporation's booth during the Winter Consumer Electronics Show in 1995 along with other titles in development for the add-on such as Battlemorph and Blue Lightning. Reports stated that around 30 actors from Hollywood were cast for the game; among them was Michael Clarke Duncan, who was a relatively unknown actor at the time of the game's production. The developer of the project, Accent Media Productions, previously worked on video game adaptations of The Joker's Wild and Jeopardy! television game shows for the CD-i. Mike Montague, one of the original developers, was hired by AMP during the same year the game was showcased on WCES 1995 and he worked on various aspects of the project such as creating environments, texture mapping and special effects by using Autodesk 3D Studio on MS-DOS, with his previous role being working on the unreleased CD-i version of Interplay Entertainment's 1988 Battle Chess. Mike stated that the actors were shot in front of a green screen, with the videos being originally filmed on analog and later being transferred to digital using Macintosh computers. Eric Adem, one of the programmers for the project joined AMP after working on Viridis Corporation's 1995 management simulation game Eco: East Africa for Windows, which was published by IVI Publishing.

Varuna's Forces was later showcased during the first Electronic Entertainment Expo in 1995, where it was announced that the game would also come to the 3DO Interactive Multiplayer and Sega Saturn as well besides the Jaguar CD, with previews showing a non-playable version of the rail shooter sections, small portions of the first-person shooter sequences and other differences compared to its earlier counterpart. It was also showcased during the Fun 'n' Games Day event hosted by Atari Corp. on June 20, 1995. The Jaguar CD version was going to be published by Atari and was slated for a November/Q4 1995 release, while both the 3DO and Saturn versions were going to be published by JVC instead, with the latter being originally slated for an October/November 1995 release. In their September 1995 issue, Computer and Video Games assessed that the Jaguar CD version was comparable to the PC version, which was also going to be published by JVC. An internal document from Atari showed that the Jaguar CD version was still listed under development as of December 1995.

Despite Varuna's Forces kept being advertised in magazines and catalogs, both the 3DO and Jaguar CD versions would be cancelled in 1996 due to the two systems being discontinued for poor commercial performance. The Saturn version was later slated for a Summer 1996 release, but according to AMP founder Paul Fullwood, development on this version was stopped after they were informed by Sega about the then-upcoming Dreamcast, transferring their work to the new system instead. However, Peter also stated that the Dreamcast version was cancelled as well, after the development team were informed by then-Sega of America president and COO Bernie Stolar that the system would be discontinued. Production of the PC version continued until JVC came across with financial difficulties that left AMP without financial support to keep developing the game, resulting into the complete cancellation of the project and leaving it unfinished as a result. Prior to its eventual discontinuation, Eric stated that each platform the game was being worked on had its own sub-team dedicated to work within the system's technical specifications. In the same year after it was cancelled for both the 3DO and Jaguar CD, its trademark was abandoned.

When Hasbro Interactive released the patents and rights to the Jaguar into public domain in 1999 by declaring it as an open platform and opening the doors for homebrew development, it permitted independent publisher and developers to release unfinished titles from the system's past life cycle as a result. Two non-playable builds of the Jaguar CD version were sold and published by B&C Computervisions in 2009. On February 15, 2009, 3DO community member bitrate uploaded footage of an early playable build from the 3DO version of Varuna's Forces to YouTube. In more recent years, footage from a playable build of the Jaguar CD version has also been uploaded online, showing several differences between it and the 3DO version.
