= Country Vid Grid =

1995 video game

- Developer: Geffen Records
- Publisher: Jasmine Multimedia Publishing
- Producer: Norman Beil
- Series: Vid Grid
- Platform: Windows
- Release: NA: May 1995
- Genres: Interactive movie, puzzle
- Mode: Single-player

Country Vid Grid is a tile-matching full motion video game developed by Geffen Records and published by Jasmine Multimedia Publishing for Windows in May 1995. It is a spin-off of the original Vid Grid, which was released in June 1994, and is the third and last entry in the franchise of the same name.

Similarly with the previous two titles, the main objective of the players is to resolve and finish a jigsaw puzzle on time before the music video that is being played on the background ends. Produced by series creator Norman Beil and conceived as a joint-venture between MCA Nashville and Jasmine Multimedia, Country Vid Grid puts emphasis on country music as its main theme unlike the original Vid Grid and Kid Vid Grid, which were themed after rock music and cartoons respectively.

== Gameplay ==
Gameplay screenshot.

For further information about the gameplay, see: Gameplay of Vid Grid

As with the previous two titles in the series, Country Vid Grid is a tile-matching FMV puzzle game where the main objective is to reassemble the music video correctly on time before the song playing on the background finishes across five levels in total, each one featuring nine puzzles to be solved and they increase in both complexity and difficulty as players progress further, while an extra puzzle is unlocked after reaching the fourth level. A source of difficulty that is shared between each entry are the videos themselves, as most of them feature quick cuts, scenery changes, among other distractions within. Like the two previous games, the scoring system is based upon the level of complexity from puzzles and how long it took players to resolve said puzzles. During gameplay, players have a variety of options to choose from such as solving or reset the puzzle.

== Development and release ==
Country Vid Grid was produced by series creator Norman Beil, who was also involved with the previous two titles, as a joint-venture between MCA Nashville and Jasmine Multimedia Publishing, who have been involved with all Vid Grid titles since the first entry. The game launched in May 1995 and it was an expansion of the original's concept but delving into the country music genre instead of the first game's rock-themed approach and the second game's cartoon thematic. A conversion of Country Vid Grid was developed and completed by High Voltage Software for the Atari Jaguar CD, but it went unreleased for unknown reasons and no prototypes of this port has surfaced to date.

=== Audio ===
The soundtrack of Country Vid Grid consists mainly of licensed songs, emphasizing solely on country music combining genres and subgenres such as neotraditional country. Producer Norman Beil stated the artists were happy to license their music for the project:

Track list
No.	Title	Length
1.	"Why Haven't I Heard from You" (Reba McEntire)	4:27
2.	"High-Tech Redneck" (George Jones)	2:26
3.	"Watermelon Crawl" (Tracy Byrd)	3:01
4.	"Highways and Heartaches" (Joe Ely)	4:13
5.	"What the Cowgirls Do" (Vince Gill)	3:03
6.	"Kiss Me, I'm Gone" (Marty Stuart)	3:05
7.	"Wrong Side of Memphis" (Trisha Yearwood)	2:46
8.	"What a Crying Shame" (The Mavericks)	3:50
9.	"It Sure Is Monday" (Mark Chesnutt)	3:20
