= Hover Strike: Unconquered Lands =

1995 video game

- North American box art
- Developer: Atari Corporation
- Publisher: Atari Corporation
- Producer: Leonard Tramiel
- Designers: Cary Gee; Craig Suko; Denis L. Fung
- Programmers: Eric Smith; Hans-Martin Kröber; Robert Zdybel
- Artists: Ken Saunders; Keoni Los Baños; Jennie Birch
- Composers: Brad Wait; Robert Wait
- Platform: Atari Jaguar CD
- Release: NA/EU: October 23, 1995
- Genre: Shooter
- Modes: Single-player, multiplayer

Hover Strike: Unconquered Lands is a shooter video game developed and published by Atari Corporation exclusively for the Atari Jaguar CD in North America and Europe on October 23, 1995. A remake of Hover Strike for the Atari Jaguar, it was created by most of the original team who worked on the original game and both titles share the same overall plot, where the Terrakian alien race seized control of a colonized foreign planet and players are tasked with piloting an armed hovercraft vehicle in an attempt of rescuing the captured colonists and destroy the invading forces from the planet's surface before the Federation armada arrives.

As with the original game, Hover Strike: Unconquered Lands received mixed reception from critics after its initial release and many felt divided in regards to multiple aspects of the game such as the presentation, visuals, sound and gameplay.

== Gameplay ==
Gameplay screenshot.

For further information about the gameplay, see: Gameplay of Hover Strike

Hover Strike: Unconquered Lands is a futuristic semi-open three-dimensional shooter game like its original predecessor, where the players take control of a heavily armed hovercraft vehicle across multiple missions set on a foreign planet, each one varying in terms of main objectives and thematic in order to annihilate the forces of the Terrakian Pirates from the planetary surface before the Federation's armada arrives to the location. The game's progression system, two-player mode and controls act like the original game, however a Memory Track cartridge has to be present for game saves. The remake features new missions and enemies not found within the original title, along with improved graphics, an arranged CD-quality soundtrack, among other extras.

== Development and release ==
Hover Strike: Unconquered Lands made its first appearance on the showfloor of E3 1995 and was in development as early as August 1995 and was originally listed for a September/Q3 1995 release. It would later be previewed in some video game magazines and the game was released on October 23, 1995 for the Jaguar CD add-on. Most of the development team from the original Hover Strike on the Jaguar were also involved in the production of the remake. Years after its release, the game's source code would be released by defunct Jaguar Sector II website under a CD compilation for PC titled Jaguar Source Code Collection on August 24, 2008.

== Reception ==
Reception

Review scores
Publication	Score
AllGame	2.5/5
Atari Gaming Headquarters	8 / 10
GamePro	11 / 20
The Electric Playground	4.5 / 10
Game Zero Magazine	34.5 / 50
MAN!AC	54%
Mega Fun	49%
ST Magazine	77%
Última Generación	39 / 100

Like the original game, Hover Strike: Unconquered Lands received mixed reception from critics after its release.
