= Hover Strike =

1995 video game

- Developer: Atari Corporation
- Publishers: NA/EU: Atari Corporation; JP: Messe Sansao, Inc.
- Producer: Leonard Tramiel
- Designers: Hank Cappa; Harry Kinney; Lance J. Lewis
- Programmers: Cary Gee; Craig Suko; Denis L. Fung
- Artists: Chris Thompson; Donald Wang; Ed Pearson
- Writer: Elizabeth Shook
- Composer: Brad Wait
- Platform: Atari Jaguar
- Release: NA: April 1995; EU: May 1995; JP: July 1995
- Genre: Shooter
- Modes: Single-player, multiplayer

Hover Strike is a shooter video game developed and published by Atari Corporation exclusively for the Atari Jaguar first in North America in April 1995, then in Europe on May of the same year and later in Japan around the same period, where it was published instead by Messe Sansao. Taking place in a future where the Terrakian Pirates have seized control of a colonized foreign planet, players are tasked with piloting an armed hovercraft vehicle in an attempt of rescuing the captured colonists and obliterate the invading alien forces from the surface of the planet before the Federation armada arrives.

Conceived as an update to Atari's 1980 arcade game Battlezone, the project originally went under the title Battlezone 2000 and was one of the first games to be greenlit and announced for the Jaguar prior to its launch, along with Cybermorph and Tempest 2000. After being showcased during the Summer Consumer Electronics Show in 1994 under the original title however, it was renamed to Hover Strike at one point during its development, likely due to it drifting away from the original source material.

Hover Strike received mixed reception from critics after its initial release, with many being divided in regards to multiple aspects of the game such as the presentation, visuals, sound and gameplay. As of April 1, 1995, it is unknown how many copies of the title were sold in total during its lifetime. A remake, Hover Strike: Unconquered Lands, was released months later for the Atari Jaguar CD and featured several enhancements compared to the original, although both shared the same overall storyline.

== Gameplay ==
Gameplay screenshot. From top to bottom, the game's HUD displays elements such as remaining number of lives, score, reticle, lock-on monitor, ammo, radar, selected sub-weapon and the hovercraft's current energy and shield levels.

Hover Strike is a futuristic semi-open 3D shooter game similar to Battlezone and T-MEK in which players pilot an armed hovercraft vehicle in order to complete a series of 30 missions, each one taking place across on different terrain types, as attempts to overthrow the Terrakian Pirates from a colonized foreign planet and rescue the remaining captured colonists before the Federation's armada arrives into the location to decimate the invading alien forces.

Before starting, players can choose between three difficulty settings and tackle either mission in any given order at the selection screen, which involves destroying a number of enemies and structures that are specified as main objectives at the briefing screen, however pressing the Option button during the mission selection brings the setup menu where various settings can be adjusted such as controls and sound configurations, in addition of saving their current progress.

After choosing a mission, players are immediately dropped into the playfield to fight against the enemies and destroy the main objectives to clear the mission, while power-ups and ammo can also be found by destroying carriers to restock their arsenal and the hovercraft's energy and shields respectively. If the players does not re-energize the hovercraft, it will self-destruct and it can also be destroyed by enemy fire if its shield are not regenerated and once all lives are lost, the game is over, though players have the option of resuming progress by loading their saved game into the last mission reached, but the number of lives used is also kept.

During gameplay, the action is viewed inside the cockpit of the hovercraft and controlling it is done by pressing A to accelerate, B for shooting photon energy and C for braking, while pressing left and right rotates the craft to the respective direction. Most of the enemies in the game are low flying aircraft that follow and shoot at the player. Moving the reticle is done by pressing up or down to shoot the photons, while pressing Option during gameplay alternates between each of the available sub-weapons and pressing either 1 or 3 on the keypad fires them. Pressing 2 will lock the reticle onto the closest enemy and pressing 5 cycles between multiple targets, while pressing 7 or 9 changes between different camera angles. Pressing either up or down with both A and C engages the vehicle into forward or reverse modes.

Terrain plays an important role in the game, as the craft automatically hovers over it and surroundings like the hills are useful for cover to avoid enemy fire, although falling off or colliding with high mountains or ledges are harmful to the vehicle. Most of the enemies in the game are low-flying aircraft that follow and shoot at the player's craft and there are also turrets and enemy hovercraft placed on the battlefield, in addition of environmental hazards. At any given time, players can abort the mission they are currently in by pausing the game and pressing any fire button to bring a setup menu, but collected power-ups will be removed and items collected during the mission are restored to their previous level upon doing so.

The game also has a two-player cooperative mode that is accessed by plugging in a second controller into the console, with one player controlling the hovercraft while the other player becomes the gunner, as they have full-range when controlling the reticle but only has access to weapons controls.

== Development and release ==
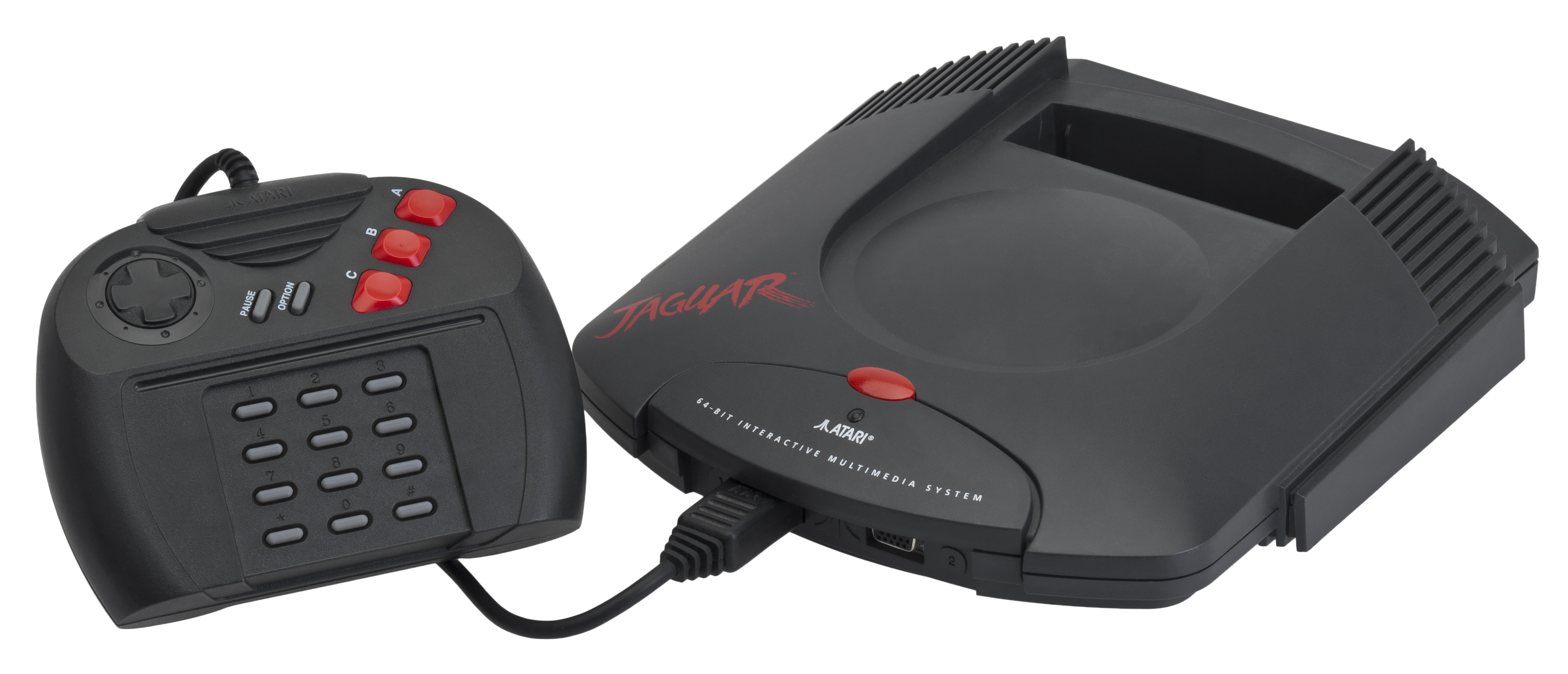
Originally intended to be an update of Battlezone as one of the first titles greenlit for the Jaguar, Hover Strike later became an original title after it began to drift away from the original source material.

Atari Corporation were already developing and planning to release an update of Battlezone for the Jaguar as early as August 1993, when the system was officially unveiled to the public. Originally titled Battlezone 2000 (not to be confused with Hand Made Software's 1995 Atari Lynx title of the same name), it was one of the first fourteen titles to be greenlit for the Jaguar before launch, along with other titles such as Cybermorph and Tempest 2000. The game was originally intended to be for only one player and it remained to be listed under its original title across various video game magazines. Battlezone 2000 for the Jaguar was first showcased to the public in a playable state at Summer Consumer Electronics Show in 1994, where it featured several visual differences compared to the final release. However at one point during its development, it was renamed to Hover Strike, likely due to the change in direction of the project and had its last trade show appearance at Atari Corp.'s booth during the Winter Consumer Electronics Show in 1995, with plans to be released early in the year.

The production of Hover Strike was spearheaded by ex-Atari vice-president in software development Leonard Tramiel, son of Jack Tramiel. Atari veteran Rob Zdybel also worked as one of the programmers. The music and sound effects were created by composer Brad Wait. Lead tester and level designer Lance J. Lewis referred to the game negatively in recent years, but stated that he had fun working on it.

Hover Strike was first released in North America in April 1995, then in Europe on May of the same year and later in Japan around the same time period, where it was distributed by Messe Sansao instead of Atari.

== Reception ==
Reception

Aggregate score
Aggregator	Score
GameRankings	45%

Review scores
Publication	Score
AllGame	3/5
Atari Gaming Headquarters	5 / 10
Computer and Video Games	69 / 100
Consoles +	70%
Electronic Games	C−
Game Players	65%
GamePro	13 / 20
Hobby Consolas	78 / 100
Hobby Hi-Tech	6 / 10
Joypad	85%
LeveL	80
MAN!AC	54%
Mega Fun	62%
Micromanía	74%
Next Generation	2/5
Player One	90%
Play Time	80%
ST-Computer	75%
Última Generación	38 / 100
Ultimate Future Games	18%
Video Games	60%

Hover Strike was met with mixed reception from critics and reviewers.

Next Generation reviewed the Jaguar version of the game, rating it two stars out of five, and stated that "despite some interesting challenges, this is, unfortunately, a serious simulator misfire."

== Legacy ==
A remake, entitled Hover Strike: Unconquered Lands, was released for the Jaguar CD add-on in October 23 of the same year. The remake featured improved graphics and additional levels. In 1996, a year after both the original and the remake were released, the game's trademark was abandoned. In May 2017, the game's source code was made freely available on a Jaguar-dedicated Facebook group.
