= FlipOut! =

1995 video game

- Jaguar cover art by Patrice Desjardins
- Developer: Gorilla Systems Corporation
- Publishers: Atari Corporation (Jaguar); GameTek, PC Games (DOS)
- Producers: Andy Rifkin; John Skruch; Jonathan Browne
- Programmers: Conrad Barski; Shawn Potts; Brian J. Gelger; Jeffrey Fullerton
- Artists: Daniel Ritchie; James Ford; Mike Taylor
- Composers: J.S. Bach; Michael Beaumont; Wolfgang A. Mozart
- Platforms: Jaguar, DOS
- Release: Jaguar: EU: July 7, 1995; NA: August 28, 1995; DOS: EU: 1996
- Genre: Puzzle
- Mode: Single-player

FlipOut! is a tile-matching video game developed by Gorilla Systems Corporation and originally published by Atari Corporation for the Atari Jaguar in Europe on July 7, 1995, and later in North America on August 28 of the same year. It is one of the first titles developed by Gorilla Systems.

In FlipOut!, the players are invited by the inhabitants of Cheese Planet, also known as Planet Phrohmaj in their native language, to join the Great Tile Flipping Festival hosted by King Fluffy across multiple planets and locations on Earth, alongside their home planet. Initially an exclusive to the Jaguar, it was later ported by the same team to DOS in 1996 and was published by GameTek. FlipOut! received mixed reception since its release, with critics being divided in regards to the game's graphics, sound, gameplay and originality.

== Gameplay ==
Jaguar screenshot

FlipOut! is a puzzle game where the main objective is to match the colored tiles into their respective colored spaces, with an extra tile that does not belong to the playfield being placed before starting a round and must be kept hanging in the air to match the other ones. Should the players take too long to match the tile into its respective space before landing on the ground, it will break and the round restarts as a result. There are nine stages to play through, each having their own number of rounds to play and ranging in thematic. There are also four levels of difficulty to choose from at the options screen of the main menu before starting a game, which changes the main gameplay. High-scores and other settings made by the players are automatically kept by cartridge's internal EEPROM, but progress must be saved manually by accessing the options menu at the map screen from the main mode.

On the initial level, players are tasked to match the tiles with their respective space on a 3x3 grid, with other rounds introducing new aliens that mess with the tiles and score is given after finishing each round depending on the player's performance. While gameplay remains relatively the same, stages increases in both difficulty and complexity as players progress through the game, with new aliens and obstacles being introduced to mess with the player's tiles. In addition, the playfield changes to reflect the location of the level. The final level is a 1v1 match with King Fluffy, ruler of the Cheese Planet on a 4x4 grid and defeating him results in the player being named the new ruler of the planet.

== Development and release ==
FlipOut! was one of the first titles developed by Gorilla Systems. An early design document shows ideas that either would be implemented into the final release, were changed or scrapped altogether, such as power-ups.

Both Electronic Gaming Monthly writer Michael Price and Dan McNamee of Atari Corp. were testers for FlipOut!. Price was tasked on pre-evalutating prototype builds of the game in Gorilla Systems' offices, while also giving feedback and suggestions to improve the experience. He also stated that the project was done on a low budget. McNamee, on the other hand, found ways to keep crashing the game but stated that he had fun with it. FlipOut! was first showcased at E3 1995, with minimal differences compared to the final release. When it launched, critics pointed out the flaws that Price suggested to improve before release but he recalls his experience with the game as a "great time and a very cool experience". After its release, the game was available to play at Atari Corp.'s UK division for the press.

FlipOut! was also ported by Gorilla Systems for MS-DOS and published by GameTek.

== Reception ==
Reception

Review scores
| Publication | Score |
|---|---|
| Next Generation | (Jaguar) 3/5 |
| Atari Gaming Headquarters | (Jaguar) 4 / 10 |
| Electronic Gaming Monthly | (Jaguar) 6.5/10, 3.5/10, 6/10, 4.5/10 |
| The Electric Playground | (Jaguar) 7 / 10 |
| Game Players | (Jaguar) 73% |
| GamePro | (Jaguar) 11.5 / 20 |
| Game Zero Magazine | (Jaguar) 34.0 / 50 |
| MAN!AC | (Jaguar) 54% |
| Mega Fun | (Jaguar) 69% |
| PC Games | (DOS) 60% |
| PC Joker | (DOS) 59% |
| PC Player | (DOS) 3/5 |
| Reset | (DOS) 6 / 10 |
| Score | (DOS) 4 / 10 |
| ST Magazine | (Jaguar) 68% |
| Última Generación | (Jaguar) 70 / 100 |
| Video Games | (Jaguar) 2/5 |
| VideoGames | (Jaguar) 6 / 10 |

FlipOut! received mixed reception when it was released.

Next Generation reviewed the Jaguar version of the game, and stated that "FlipOut! is an enjoyable and original puzzler on a system sadly devoid of them."

== Legacy ==
After FlipOut! was released, Gorilla Systems started developing a horror-themed game for the Atari Jaguar CD titled Dante's Inferno, which was based on the first part of Dante Alighieri's 14th-century epic poem Divine Comedy and was scheduled for a June 1996 release, but it was never released. In 2004, a demo of Dante's Inferno was released by the defunct Jaguar Sector II website under a CD-ROM compilation titled Jaguar Extremist Pack #1.
