= Sam Humphrey =

New Zealander-Australian actor (born 1994)

- Born: 1994 (age 31–32); New Zealand
- Occupation: Actor
- Years active: 2016–present
- Notable work: Neighbours; The Greatest Showman

Sam Humphrey (born 1994) is a New Zealand–born actor from Frankston, Victoria, Australia. He is best known for playing Charles Stratton in the 2017 film The Greatest Showman.

== Early life ==
Humphrey was born with a rare genetic disorder called acrodysplasia. As a child, he was also diagnosed with Crohn's disease, and spent much of his life in hospitals.

In an interview, he said that he had attempted suicide several times, but with support from his family, his faith and his resilience, he was able to overcome his challenges and pursue his dream of becoming an actor.

Humphrey has two siblings; his older brother is entrepreneur Josiah Humphrey, who co-founded the tech company Appster in 2011.

Humphrey attended Tawa intermediate, Wellington, New Zealand in 2006.

Humphrey is of half Asian descent.

== Career ==
Prior to his professional debut, Humphrey appeared in numerous school productions.

Humphrey began his acting career in television, his first role on Neighbours, where he appeared on four episodes. He made his film debut in the historical drama musical film The Greatest Showman, he played Charles Stratton, a dwarf performer who is also known by his stage name of General Tom Thumb. As he was taller than the real Tom Thumb, he had to walk on his knees and his voice was digitally altered to sound deeper.

In 2017, Humphrey starred in the television film Jeremy the Dud.

== Filmography ==
=== Film ===
Year	Title	Role	Notes
2017	The Greatest Showman	Charles Stratton	

=== Television ===
Year	Title	Role	Notes
2016–2017	Neighbours	James Udagawa	4 episodes
2017	Jeremy the Dud	Jai	Television film
