= Vid Grid =

1994 video game

- Developers: Geffen Records; High Voltage Software (Jaguar CD)
- Publishers: Windows: NA: Jasmine Multimedia Publishing; EU: Virgin Interactive; Jaguar CD: NA/EU: Atari Corporation
- Producer: Norman Beil
- Series: Vid Grid
- Platforms: Atari Jaguar CD, Windows
- Release: Windows: NA: September 13, 1994; EU: 1994; Jaguar CD: NA/EU: September 21, 1995
- Genres: Interactive movie, puzzle
- Mode: Single-player

Vid Grid is a tile-matching full motion video puzzle game originally developed by Geffen Records and published by Jasmine Multimedia Publishing for Windows on September 13, 1994. It was later ported to the Atari Jaguar CD by High Voltage Software in 1995, where it was included along with Blue Lightning as one of the pack-in games for the peripheral when it launched. It is the first entry in the series of the same name.

In Vid Grid, players have to solve a sliding puzzle. However, unlike traditional sliding puzzles which require the player to manipulate and sequence numbered tiles (usually 1 through 15) or reassemble a still graphic, in Vid Grid the jumbled tiles make-up the moving image of a music video.

Conceived by Geffen executive Norman Beil and produced in conjunction with Jasmine Multimedia as a joint-venture, the game was one of the first titles to use Microsoft's Video for Windows multimedia framework, which allowed to play and encode digital video up to a maximum resolution of 320x240 pixels.

Vid Grid was well received upon its original release on PC and has sold 100,000 copies as of April 8, 1995. The Jaguar CD version also garnered positive reception and was praised for the gameplay. Due to the critical and commercial success of the original game, two spin-offs were released in 1995, with each one featuring a distinctive thematic and selection of music videos respectively.

== Gameplay ==
Gameplay screenshot from the original Windows version.

A music video plays in a window. The window is divided into squares that are scrambled. The player must unscramble the squares by sliding them into an adjacent position while the music video is playing and before the music ends. The quick cuts, scenery changes and other distractions of a music video are what make Vid Grid challenging.

Vid Grid starts easy, with just 9 puzzle tiles in a 3x3 grid, but gets progressively more challenging as the number of squares increase, up to a 6x6 grid. In level one, players can simply drag-and-drop squares into position. After that, they can only move the squares by sliding them into an open adjacent position, just like a typical sliding tile puzzle. In the most difficult level, some of the squares are upside down. After all nine music videos have been solved for the highest level of difficulty, the player is rewarded with a hidden tenth video. The scoring is based upon the level of complexity from puzzles and how long it took players to resolve said puzzles. During gameplay, the players have a variety of options to choose from such as solve or reset the puzzle, while the Option button must be pressed to bring these extra options in the Atari Jaguar CD version. The Jaguar CD version also supports the Memory Track cartridge for game save.

== Development and release ==
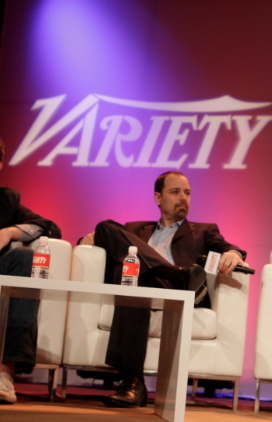
Jasmine Multimedia Publishing founder Jay Samit in 2011.

Vid Grid was first conceptualized by Geffen Records head of new media and former Billboard magazine editor Norman Beil during a jigsaw puzzle play session with his children in late 1993, where the idea of moving jigsaw puzzles intrigued him and it also occurred to Beil that music videos could be the ideal puzzle pieces. Beil then proceeded to contact Jasmine Multimedia Publishing, the company where he previously worked before, to pitch them the idea in early 1994 and acted as the game's producer during its development, which was done in conjunction between Geffen and Jasmine Multimedia as a joint-venture.

Jasmine founder Jay Samit stated that it was one of the first times where any company created the technology to "go inside" the video within its borders and move the puzzle pieces as the music video itself played, while Beil stated that development went smoothly due to the straightforward design and that the engineers at Jasmine managed to break the video barriers. In addition, Beil also worked closely with Jasmine's engineers after consulting with one of his children on the strategies and levels of difficulty found within the game. Samit also claimed the videos featured were four times larger than those found in other titles at the time and that the video compression (which was done with the Cinepak video codec) took over a day to digitize one minute of them. By June 1994, Beil and his team had a working prototype ready for demonstration and the game was showcased for the first time to the general public at the Summer Consumer Electronics Show of the same year.

Vid Grid was released in North America on September 13, 1994 and became one of the first major software products to make use of Microsoft's Video for Windows multimedia framework, which allowed to play and encode digital video up to a maximum resolution of 320x240 pixels. It marked the debut of Geffen Records in the video game industry and became one of the subjects of discussions in regards to the usage of music across other formats, music publishing rights, among other topics. Due to its music-lent nature, the game was distributed across multiple types of retailers. The title was also released in Europe by Virgin Interactive around the same period. It would be later showcased on various television series such as Lifestyles of the Rich and Famous and Wired TV.

=== Atari Jaguar CD version ===
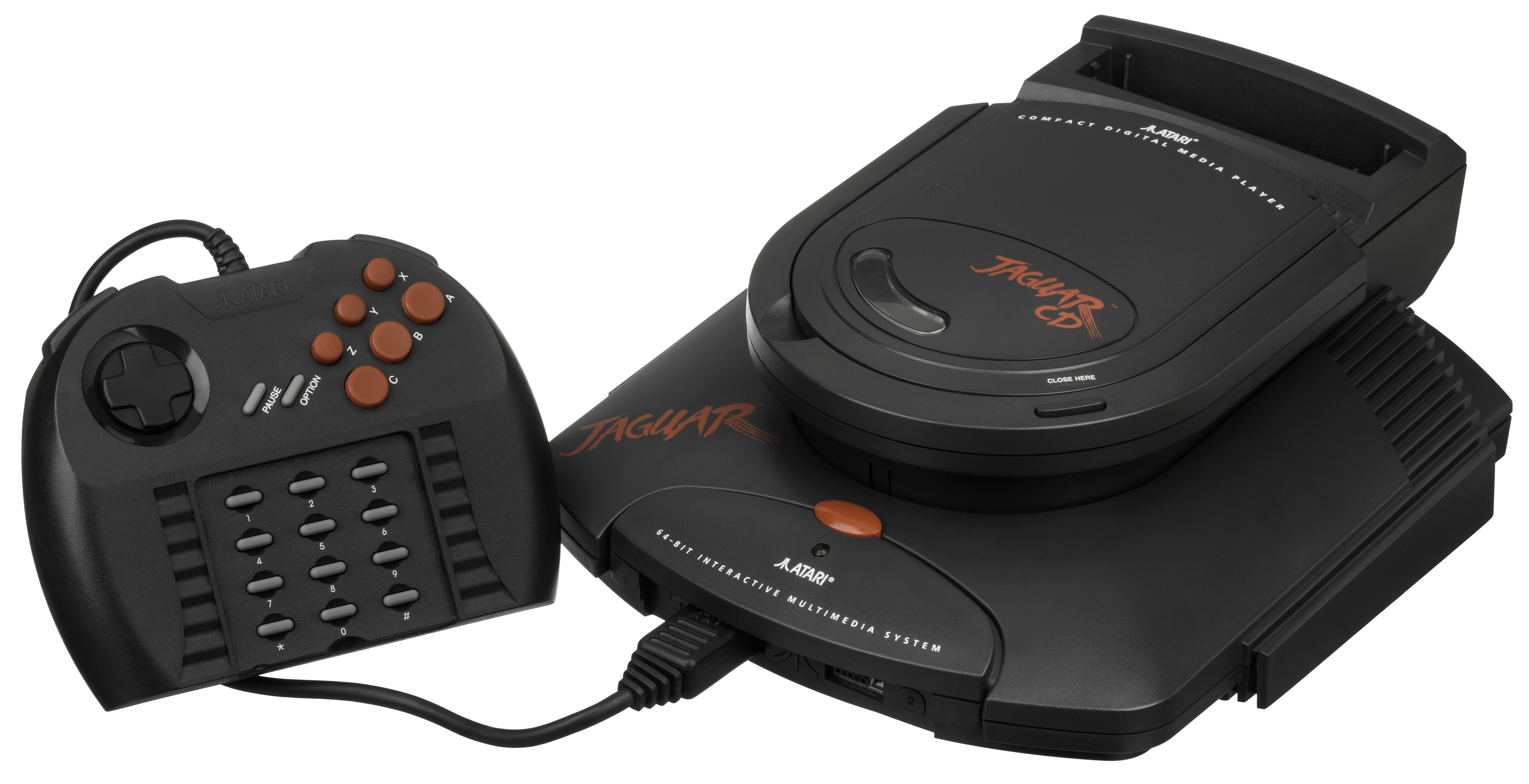
Being one of the two pack-in games for the Atari Jaguar CD, Vid Grid served as a showcase of the peripheral's full motion video capabilities.

After its release on PCs, Vid Grid was later ported to the Atari Jaguar CD by High Voltage Software, where it became one of the two bundled titles with the add-on during its launch on September 21, 1995, serving as a showcase of the system's full motion video capabilities. This version was first demonstrated to the attendees at Atari Corporation's booth during the Winter CES in early 1995 and it would be later demonstrated again on various trading shows such as E3 1995 and the Fun 'n' Games Day event hosted by Atari Corp. on the same year, in addition of being covered by the magazine press that were invited to Atari's UK division. It was originally planned for a Q1 1995 release but was later pushed back to an August/Q3 1995 release date instead.

In an online conversation with an anonymous High Voltage Software programmer for the Jaguar by website Cyberroach, he stated that they developed several additional features not found in the original PC version for the conversion but were scrapped as Atari wanted to keep the port faithful. Scott Corley, main programmer and one of the designers of Ruiner Pinball at High Voltage Software claimed in a thread at the 3DO Zone forums that the porting process of the title to the Jaguar CD, which was done by programmer Brian McGroarty, was one of the "smoothest projects" the company has worked on, as there were no major issues during development, despite a setback with audio compression formats. It is also the largest game released for the add-on in terms of memory size (at 630 MB).

=== Audio ===
The soundtrack of Vid Grid consists mainly of licensed songs with heavy emphasis on rock music combining genres and subgenres such as power ballad, blue-eyed soul, funk, hard rock, psychedelic, acid, heavy metal, blues, rap and grunge. Former Geffen Records A&R executive John Kalodner was responsible for compiling and providing the list of songs featured in the game from multiple record labels like Elektra, MCA and Warner Bros., among others including Geffen's own repertoire. Though he expected resistance from labels to have their tracks featured in the game, producer Norman Beil stated they agreed upon seeing the project and that the artists were eager to license their music videos, in addition of pushing to offer them royalties equal to the then-multimedia market. Each song is present in both Windows and Jaguar CD versions:

Track list
No.	Title	Length
1.	"Cryin'" (Aerosmith)	5:32
2.	"Sledgehammer" (Peter Gabriel)	5:02
3.	"November Rain" (Guns N' Roses)	9:17
4.	"Are You Experienced?" (The Jimi Hendrix Experience)	4:16
5.	"Enter Sandman" (Metallica)	5:31
6.	"Right Now" (Van Halen)	4:25
7.	"No More Tears" (Ozzy Osbourne)	5:58
8.	"Give It Away" (Red Hot Chili Peppers)	4:33
9.	"Spoonman" (Soundgarden)	4:26

Unpublicized hidden bonus video: "Smells Like Teen Spirit" (Nirvana)

== Reception ==
Reception

Review scores
Publication	Score
AllGame	(Jaguar CD) 4/5
Game Zero Magazine	(Jaguar CD) 39.0 / 50
Mega Fun	(Jaguar CD) 59%
ST Magazine	(Jaguar CD) 86%

Award
Publication	Award
Consumer Electronics Show (1994)	Best Multimedia Software

Vid Grid was well regarded upon its release on PC and as of April 8, 1995, it has sold 100,000 copies and received the "Best Multimedia Software" award at SCES 1994. The Jaguar CD version was also well received, due to being one of the pack-in titles for the peripheral when it launched, with praise towards the gameplay.

== Legacy ==
After the release of Vid Grid, Geffen Records and Jasmine Multimedia created two spin-offs that were released in 1995, with each one having a distinctive thematic and selection of music videos respectively; Kid Vid Grid (which prominently features cartoons from Hanna-Barbera) and Country Vid Grid (which focuses on country music as the name implies). On a May 1995 article by Billboard magazine, Jay Samit commented on the possibility of creating other titles in the series but themed around musicians from countries across the world such as Argentina and Germany. In 1997, two years after its release, the game's trademark was abandoned.
