= Kid Vid Grid =

1994 video game

- Developer: Geffen Records
- Publisher: Jasmine Multimedia Publishing
- Producer: Norman Beil
- Series: Vid Grid
- Platform: Microsoft Windows
- Release: NA: 1994
- Genres: Interactive movie, puzzle
- Mode: Single-player

Kid Vid Grid is a tile-matching full motion video puzzle game developed by Geffen Records and published by Jasmine Multimedia Publishing for Windows in 1994. It is a spin-off of the original Vid Grid, which was released on the same year, and is it also the second entry in the franchise of the same name.

In the game, the main objective of the players is to resolve and finish a jigsaw puzzle on time before the video clip that is being played on the background ends. Produced by series creator Norman Beil, Kid Vid Grid is mainly themed after cartoons and prominently features characters from animated series by Hanna-Barbera such as Huckleberry Hound and Snagglepuss unlike the original Vid Grid, which had a heavy emphasis on rock music combining multiple genres and subgenres.

== Gameplay ==
Gameplay screenshot.

For further information about the gameplay, see: Gameplay of Vid Grid

As with the original game, Kid Vid Grid is a tile-matching FMV puzzle game where the main objective of the players is to correctly reassemble the cartoon short on time before the video clip ends across five levels in total, each one featuring nine puzzles to be solved and they increase in both complexity and difficulty as players progress further, while an extra puzzle is unlocked after reaching the fourth level. Another source of difficulty are the videos themselves, as most of them feature various types of distractions within. Like the original title, scoring is based upon the level of complexity from puzzles and how long it took players to resolve said puzzles. During gameplay, the players have a variety of options to choose from such as solve or reset the puzzle, among other options. Unlike the original, however, the video clips last much longer and the first level consist of arranging 2x2 puzzles instead of 3x3 puzzles. After completing the puzzle, a small video clip is played as an award for the players.

== Development and release ==
Kid Vid Grid was a joint effort between Geffen Records head of new media Norman Beil, who was also involved as producer of the original Vid Grid, and Jasmine Multimedia Publishing. The game launched in 1994 and it was an expansion of the original's concept but delving into children's shows instead of music videos. It was showcased to attendees of Winter Consumer Electronics Show in 1995. A conversion of Kid Vid Grid was developed and completed by High Voltage Software for the Atari Jaguar CD, but it went unreleased for unknown reasons.

=== List of shorts ===
All of the cartoon shorts featured in Kid Vid Grid are mainly from those created by Hanna-Barbera. The game also includes short clips from others shows as a reward to players for completing the puzzle in time:

- 2 Stupid Dogs
- Dastardly and Muttley in Their Flying Machines
- Dino and Cavemouse
- The Huckleberry Hound Show
- Pixie and Dixie and Mr. Jinks
- Snagglepuss

== Legacy ==
In 1997, three years after its release, the game's trademark was abandoned.
