= Zzyorxx II =

Scrolling shooter video game

- Title screen
- Developer: Virtual Xperience
- Publisher: Virtual Xperience
- Producer: Rodolphe Czuba
- Programmer: Thierry Schembri
- Platform: Atari Jaguar
- Release: Unreleased
- Genre: Scrolling shooter
- Modes: Single-player, multiplayer

Zzyorxx II is an unreleased scrolling shooter video game that was in development and planned to be published by Virtual Xperience on a scheduled 1994 release date exclusively for the Atari Jaguar. It was one of the three projects Virtual Xperience had under development for the system that would never be finished and released to the public. In the game, players would have taken control of two distinct fighter crafts across five stages taking place on different time periods while fighting against an armada of enemies. Despite never receiving an official release to the public, a ROM image of an early build of Zzyorxx II was released online in 2018 at the AtariAge forum.

== Gameplay ==
Gameplay screenshot from the released beta build.

Zzyorxx II is an arcade-style scrolling shooter game similar to Axelay and Life Force where players take control of two distinct spacecraft through five stages set across different time periods, each one featuring their own thematic and alternating between horizontal and vertical scrolling, while fighting against enemies and bosses.

Pressing A activates a weak laser shot, while pressing B unleashes a special weapon unique for each craft. In addition, players could also collect power-ups in order to increase the ship's firepower, energy to restore their respective lifebars, and shields for protection against enemy contact.

== History ==
Virtual Xperience was a French video game development studio founded by Rodolphe Czuba in December 1993 after his previous company, Retour 2048, was closed due to management issues from two of their employees and would later be involved during the development of Shen Technologies' Super Burnout. The company had three projects under development for the Jaguar platform, two of which were Zzyorxx II and a platform game titled Indiana Jags. The game was first announced in early 1994 under the name Zozziorx and was touted for a Q2 1994 release, but GameFan and French magazine Joypad previewed some of the first screenshots for the game in the third quarter of 1994, now under the title Zzyorxx and planned for a Q3 1994 release instead.

It remained to be previewed across multiple magazines through 1995 under its final name but had no concrete release date set. However, Rodolphe and programmer Thierry Schembri stated that development of the project was halted two months before nearing completion by their then-managing associate at Virtual Xperience, with no reason given to this decision and the game was left unreleased as a result. It was listed by online magazine Atari Explorer Online in the last issue under their original name in January 1996, and was also last previewed by CD Consoles the same month.

Zzyorxx II made use of the console's DSP chip and runs at 60 frames per second. The hand-drawn graphics are rendered using the 256 color format and displayed up to 70 sprites on-screen, while sound effects were created using Atari Falcon. Thierry has stated in an online interview that he still owns some of the game's assets but not the development tools, which were made on the Amiga, making it difficult to retrieve. He also said that the rights to Zzyorxx II are now under Colt Technology Services, who purchased Virtual Xperience.

== Release ==
In April 2018, a ROM image of an early playable build of Zzyorxx II was released online by video game collector Clint Thompson at AtariAge which was stored on a diskette preserved by the National Videogame Museum, making it the only build of the game that has surfaced to date. The build supports two players simultaneously, but it only features one stage background and the gameplay is prone to glitches.
