= Deathwatch (video game) =

- Misspelled title screen
- Developer: Data Design Interactive
- Publisher: Atari Corporation
- Producer: Eamonn Barr
- Designer: John Court
- Programmer: Ben Whitlock
- Artist: Richard Priest
- Composer: Darren Wood
- Platform: Atari Jaguar
- Release: Unreleased
- Genres: Platform, run and gun
- Modes: Single-player, multiplayer

Deathwatch is an unreleased run and gun platform video game that was in development by Data Design Interactive and planned to be published by Atari Corporation on a scheduled December 1995 release date exclusively for the Atari Jaguar. It was the only game in development by DDI for the system.

Taking control of an anthropomorphic bug character wielding a gun, players would have needed to traverse through multiple levels while fighting against enemies and avoiding obstacles along the way. Deathwatch was demonstrated during the first Electronic Entertainment Expo held in 1995, featuring a visual style similar to that of Plok on the Super NES.

Atari Corp. halted and terminated development of Deathwatch along with multiple upcoming projects for the platform in March 1996, before merging with JT Storage in a reverse takeover the next month of the same year, while the game's source code has become lost with time.

== Gameplay ==
Gameplay screenshot from the E3 1995 beta build.

Deathwatch is a side-scrolling run and gun platform game where players would have taken the role of an anthropomorphic bug character who wields a gun for defensive purposes and capable of making double jumps in order to traverse across various levels, each one featuring their own set of obstacles and thematic, while shooting at enemies to avoid taking damage and collecting items along the way. Players would have also need to collect power-ups in the level to change the character's in-game appearance.

== History ==
Deathwatch was first showcased to the public at Atari Corporation's booth during E3 1995, featuring an artstyle similar to that of Plok, a platform title developed by Software Creations and released for the Super NES two years prior, while French magazine CD Consoles referred it as SwitchDeath. It was listed for a December/Q4 1995 release in magazines, with internal documents from Atari Corp. also revealing that the game was internally known as The Bug.

Though it was kept being advertised in catalogs and magazines for a late 1995 release, Atari halted its development before it was completed, with former DDI president and CEO Stewart Green stating in a 2003 forum post at AtariAge provided by community member panamajoe that the publisher's marketing department wanted to focus on 3D titles instead of 2D ones, in addition of stating that the source code of the game has become lost with time. Atari would also stop production of other upcoming titles for the Jaguar before merging with JT Storage in April 1996, ultimately resulting with the game not being released.

Although a prototype cartridge is rumored to exist, no ROM image of the title has managed to surface online. The only known gameplay footage of the game that exists as of date was shown by Atari Explorer Online on the "AEO at E3 1995" VHS release by Subspace Publishing.
