= Super Burnout =

1995 video game

- Developer: Shen Technologies SARL
- Publishers: NA/EU: Atari Corporation Virtual Xperience; JP: Messe Sansao, Inc.
- Producers: Bill Rehbock; Elysée Adé; Loïc Duval
- Programmer: Olivier Nallet
- Artists: Kheang Tan; Olivier Baron
- Composer: Alexandre Ekian
- Platform: Atari Jaguar
- Release: NA: 5 July 1995; EU: 7 July 1995; JP: July 1995
- Genre: Racing
- Modes: Single-player, multiplayer

Super Burnout (Note: Japanese: スーパーバーンアウト, Hepburn: Sūpā Bānauto) is a motorcycle racing video game developed by French studio Shen Technologies SARL and co-published by Atari Corporation and Virtual Xperience exclusively for the Atari Jaguar in North America and Europe in July 1995. It was also published in Japan by Messe Sansao during the same period. It is the first title to be created by Shen Technologies.

Heavily inspired by various arcade games such as Sega's Super Hang-On, Super Burnout is an arcade-style racer where players takes control from any of the available motorcycles against CPU-controlled opponents or against other players, with heavy emphasis on pseudo-3D sprite-scaling graphics at a high frame rate.

Super Burnout received mixed reception upon its release, with some reviewers giving praise to various aspects of the game such as controls, sound design and high sense of speed but was criticized by others for its gameplay and lack of originality, while many critics were divided towards the graphics. However, retrospective reviews in regards to the title have been more positive in recent years, with publications such as PC Magazine referring it as one of the best titles for the system.

== Gameplay ==
Gameplay screenshot.

Super Burnout is an arcade-style racing game that uses a behind-the-motorcycle perspective similar to Super Hang-On and Suzuka 8 Hours, featuring both single-player and multiplayer modes where players race across eight tracks set in the United States of America, Australia, Brazil, Canada, France, Germany, Hungary, and Japan; there is no time limit present nor checkpoints for time extension. Each time that the player's motorcycle crashes after colliding with an obstacle or with another motorcycle, they are instantly respawned into the track without pause, however, motor oil may be spilled after crashing and it must be avoided to not lose grip of the vehicle. All of the tracks in the game are rated based on technicality, semi-technicality or high speed. Before starting, players can access to options menu at the title screen where various settings can be changed such as controls, automatic or manual transmission, number of laps, among other options that are automatically saved into the cartridge's internal EEPROM, which also keeps the best times obtained when playing.

=== Modes ===
The game has four modes of play: Trainer, Versus, Championship and Record. Championship, as the name implies, is the main mode of the game where a single player competes against six computer-controlled opponents over eight tracks. In this mode, finishing each race will allow the player to achieve a certain number of standings points, depending on the position the player finishes in; a first-place finish rewards a maximum of 20 points for each track, and the total maximum number of points possible is 180. Trainer mode is recommended for beginners to practice in any of the available courses with other opponents and refine their driving skills. Versus mode allows two players to compete against each other in head-to-head races on a split screen. Record is a time trial mode where players compete against the clock in an attempt to obtain the best time possible.

=== Motorcycles ===
Super Burnout features six motorcycles to choose from before starting any game mode, each one having their own pros and cons that players must take advantage of depending on the track, however, a seventh motorcycle can be unlocked by either entering a cheat code or obtaining a high rank after finishing Championship mode:

1. Lightning Racer
2. Sliding Thunder
3. Killing Turtle
4. Super Rabbit
5. Reflex Z
6. Wheels of Terror
7. Punisher (Note: The bike is normally unlocked if the player obtains 140 points or more in the Championship mode (equivalent to a rank of A); the cheat code 2-1-9-7-4 can also be entered at the title screen to unlock the bike.)

== Production ==
=== Background ===
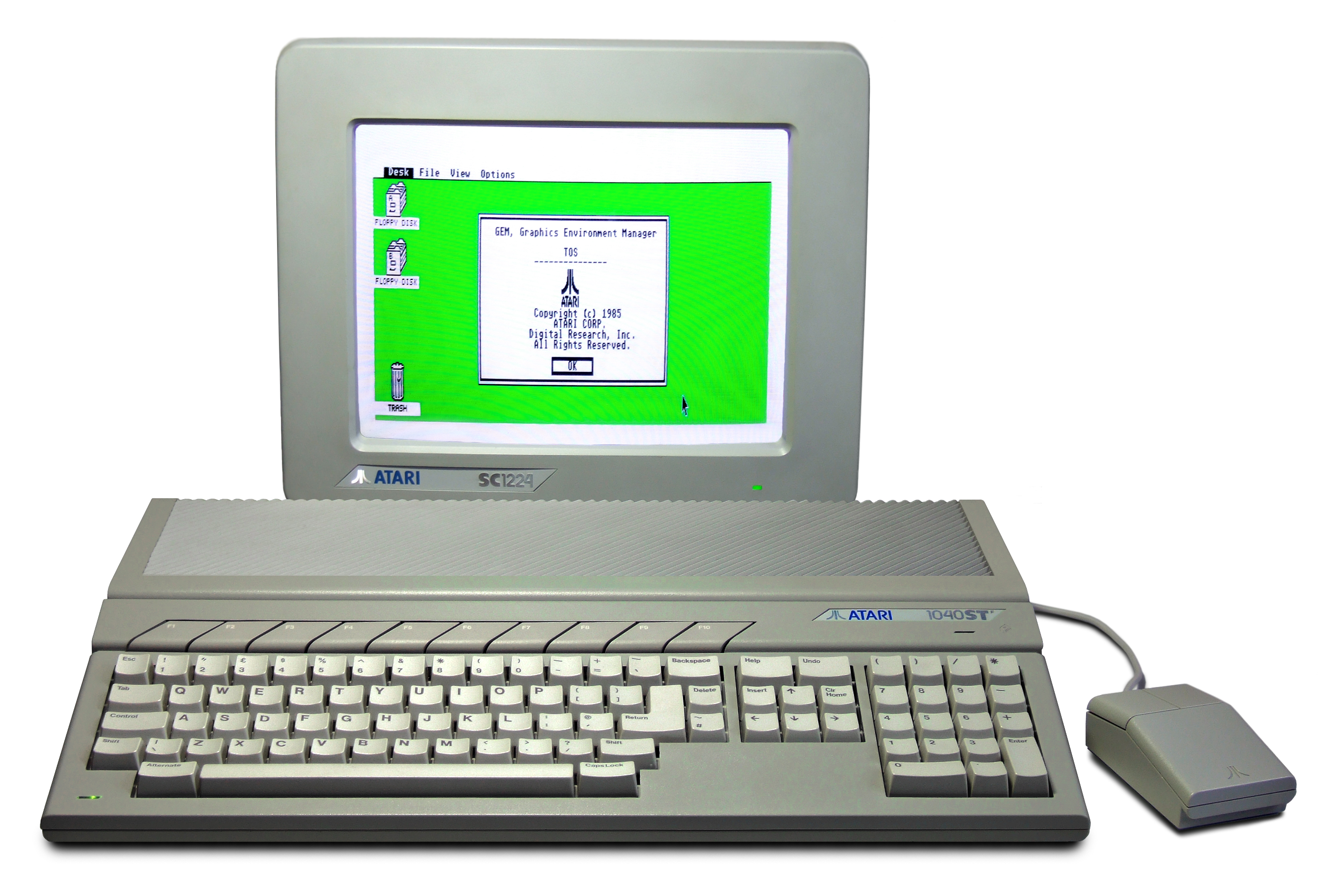
Many of the members that would later form Shen Technologies, began writing demos for the Atari ST platform.

In 1989, the demogroup Constellations was formed when Atari ST programmer Elysée Adé and graphic artist Kheang Tan met each other during high school in order to compete against other demoscene groups by creating demos that were capable of taking advantage of both the ST and Amiga, with a focus on fluidity. Originally a two-man team, the group grew when programmers Stéphane Bensoussan and Laurent Arquetoux joined them, creating their very first demo during this period. The group grew further when more people joined them including composer Alexandre Habekian and programmers William Ilzizine and Olivier Nallet, creating two more demos before the French division of Atari Corporation approached them and requested a demo for Atari STe to be featured in events and a promotional campaign. However, their activity dwindled when each member restarted pursuing their careers, while Elysée began writing articles for the French publication ST Magazine and eventually becoming editor-in-chief.

Virtual Xperience was a French video game development studio that was founded by Rodolphe Czuba in December 1993 as a successor to Retour 2048, which had closed due to management issues from two of their employees earlier that year. VX had three titles under development for the Jaguar; A platform game titled Indiana Jags, a shoot 'em up named Zzyorxx II and a space combat simulator called Starnet, neither of which were finished and released to the public.

=== Development ===
In 1992, Constellations thought of creating a track and field title inspired by the 1992 Summer Olympics, among other demos and ideas in order to attract a publisher. As the group were fans of Sega's Super Scaler arcade games such as After Burner, Out Run and Super Hang-On, they settled in making a motorcycle racing title modelled after the latter as the Jaguar lacked "a good racing game", according to Kheang in a 2006 online interview. Through one of his contacts who had connection with Virtual Xperience, Elysée and the team borrowed one of their Jaguar development kits to start working on the title during weekends, while VX acted as an intermediary between them and Atari Corporation, in addition of working on its production. Although the idea was conceived in late 1993, the game was created between February and December 1994, with the development process taking approximately 12 to 14 months in completing it. Kheang, Olivier Nallet and Alexandre worked on the game along with Elysée on his bedroom, with graphic artist Olivier Baron later joining the team during development to help with artwork. In a 2007 forum thread at AtariAge and a 2012 online interview, Olivier Nallet recounted more about the game's development process, stating that he worked at high hours during weekends before returning the borrowed development kit back to VX and keep with his college studies, but they later gave the team a development kit full-time to keep working on the project after seeing their results.

Besides Super Hang-On, Namco's Suzuka 8 Hours 2, along with the original Ridge Racer and its sequel also served as inspirations for the team during development. All the programming work was done using an Atari TT030, while all the artwork was realized using an Amiga 2000 with Deluxe Paint. Alexandre composed the soundtrack for Super Burnout by using the Atari STe and synthesizers, which was played at 32 KHz with 10 sound channels during gameplay. When showing a demo of the game, Atari Corp. became interested in publishing the title and started being more involved on its development, giving the team a few months to finish it before release. As the team received a sum of money from Atari for the development of the game prior to its release, they would establish Shen Technologies as a company.

== Release ==
Super Burnout was previewed in a feature article on the September 1994 issue of French magazine Joypad under its original name Burn Out, featuring a completely different art style compared to the final version, along with Indiana Jag and Zzyorxx II. Burn Out was then shown in the Do The Math promotional recording sent by Atari to video game retail stores in an early but playable state on 14 November 1994, with the artwork now bearing resemblance to the final version, but featuring eight racers on the track during single-player instead of seven in the final version. In their November and December 1994 issues, French magazine CD Consoles stated that the game would support LAN play for multiplayer via JagLink, however Olivier Nallet later remarked that the feature was removed during development due to stability issues and time constrains, despite requests from Atari to implement it. The game was later advertised in EGM^{2} for a Q1 1995 release and on their next issue in 1995.

Burn Out made its appearance on the showfloor of events such as WCES 1995, Spring ECTS '95 and E3 1995, with the latter being its last trade show appearance prior to launch and was now scheduled for a Q3 1995 release. Olivier Nallet also stated that the reason for renaming the game from Burn Out to Super Burnout was due to a decision from Atari's marketing department in hopes of increasing sales numbers. It was also showcased to the press that were invited to Atari's presentation of the Jaguar in Spain prior to its release in the region.

== Reception ==
Reception

Aggregate score
Aggregator	Score
GameRankings	41%

Review scores
Publication	Score
AllGame	2.5/5
The Atari Times	81%
Atari World	7/10
CD Consoles	3/5
Edge	4 / 10
Electronic Gaming Monthly	9.5 / 20
The Electric Playground	3.5 / 10
GamesMaster	26 / 100
Game Players	73%
GamePro	14 / 20
Games World	41%
Joypad	85%
MAN!AC	59%
Mega Fun	58%
Next Generation	3/5
ST Magazine	87%
Superjuegos	85 / 100
Última Generación	70 / 100
Ultimate Future Games	31%
Video Games	58%
VideoGames	5 / 10
X Gen	64 / 100

Super Burnout received mixed reception upon release.

Dave Halverson of GameFan gave positive review to the game, praising the graphics and controls, remarking that "if you're looking for some good old fashioned racing, Jag style, Super Burnout should be your next purchase".

Next Generation reviewed the game, and stated that "Burn Out is essentially straightforward racing at its best, but those who are looking for extra action won't find it here."

== Legacy ==
After the release of Super Burnout, Shen Technologies began working on a vertically scrolling shooter project inspired by Raiden for the Jaguar titled Nexus, which was also known as Stellar X early in development and its original title can be seen teased on various tracks of game, while a message in French teasing the then-upcoming project is shown during the credits sequence. During its development, graphic artist Paul Tumelaire (who previously worked on various Delphine Software International titles such as Shaq Fu and Fade to Black) and programmer Julien Merceron joined the company to work on the project, but due to the arrival of both PlayStation and Sega Saturn, along with Atari cancelling any 2D title that were in development for the Jaguar, the project was ultimately terminated. The game was 30 percent complete prior to its cancellation.

Shen Technologies would later create Adidas Power Soccer 2 and Adidas Power Soccer 98 for Psygnosis on PlayStation, before closing their doors in 1998.

In April 2018, a ROM image of an early non-playable build of Super Burnout was released online by video game collector Clint Thompson at AtariAge along with an early playable build of Zzyorxx II, which were stored on diskettes preserved by the National Videogame Museum.
