= Tsunami Aid =

2005 benefit concert

Tsunami Aid: A Concert of Hope was a worldwide benefit held for the tsunami victims of the 2004 Indian Ocean earthquake. It was broadcast on NBC and its affiliated networks of USA Network, Bravo, PAX, MSNBC, CNBC, Sci-Fi, Trio, Telemundo and other NBC Universal stations and was heard on any Clear Channel radio station. The benefit was led by the actor George Clooney on January 15, 2005, and was similar to America: A Tribute to Heroes (set up after the September 11th, 2001 attacks). Digital Media innovator Jay Samit enabled viewers to purchase digital downloads of the performances as a new way to raise money for the cause; including live recordings by Elton John, Madonna, Sheryl Crow, Eric Clapton, Roger Waters and Diana Ross. Taking a cue from Bob Geldof (the man who had organized the Live Aid concerts for African famine relief), it consisted of famous Hollywood entertainers and former American presidents George H. W. Bush and Bill Clinton. It was two hours long with stories and entertainment from a huge array of Hollywood notables that include Brad Pitt, Donald Trump, and much more. It was estimated to raise at least five million dollars by the end of the broadcast.

== See also ==
- List of highest-grossing benefit concerts
