= Battlemorph =

1995 video game

- Developer: Attention to Detail
- Publisher: Atari Corporation
- Producer: Sean Patten
- Designers: Jim McPhail; Stuart Tilley
- Artists: David West; Ian G. Harling; Joanne Surman
- Composer: Will Davis
- Platform: Atari Jaguar CD
- Release: NA/EU: December 1995
- Genre: Shooter
- Mode: Single-player

Battlemorph is a 1995 shooter video game developed by Attention to Detail (ATD) and published by Atari Corporation for the Atari Jaguar CD. It is the sequel to Cybermorph (1993), a pack-in game for the Atari Jaguar. Taking place 30 years after the events of the original game, the player pilots the morphing infiltration fighter War Griffon in an extermination mission against the Pernitia empire, which plans to launch a full-scale invasion to eradicate humanity and take over the galaxy after being pushed back to their home planet. The player is tasked with various objectives, while fighting against enemies and bosses, across eight galaxy clusters in order to liberate them from control of the empire.

Battlemorph was pitched by ATD to Atari after the launch of Cybermorph, being announced in 1994 as one of the first upcoming titles for the Jaguar CD add-on. The team wanted to make a sequel and implement ideas that they were not able to include, while also using techniques learned late during development of the first game to improve the experience. It received generally favorable reception from critics; praise was given to the soundtrack, ability to traverse any terrain, and overall improvements made over Cybermorph, though some felt mixed regarding its presentation, visuals, and controls. Retrospective commentary has been equally favorable and is cited as one of the best games for the Jaguar.

== Gameplay and premise ==
The player controls the War Griffon, which is capable of traversing planetary surfaces, underwater areas, and interconnected tunnels (shown here is the planet Silur)

Like its predecessor, Battlemorph is a three-dimensional shooter game played from a third-person perspective. The plot takes place 30 years after the events occurred in Cybermorph; the Pernitia empire was pushed back to their home planet after defeat by the resistance but at the cost of human colonies. The Earth Defense Council decided not to risk another invasion, building interstellar battle cruisers to patrol colonies. There were no signs of irregularity, but cruisers near the Perseus star cluster began disappearing, while other fleets reported signs of Pernitian activity in eight galaxies before their disappearance. The Council deployed the Sutherland cruiser carrying the morphing infiltration fighter War Griffon into the Perseus cluster, but runs out of plasma energy after using its warp drive systems.

The main objective of the game is to collect plasma energy held off by Pernitian generals on each galaxy and reach the Pernish cluster to exterminate the empire, before they launch a full-scale invasion to eradicate humanity and take over the galaxy. The player can select a planet, each one showing a mission briefing, and load the War Griffon with up to four special weapons to use before being launched into the location. Various types of mission objectives such as retrieval of data pods, activation of detonators in military outposts, and elimination of enemy headquarters, must be completed in order to clear a planet. Each galaxy cluster consists of multiple planets that can be played in any order, with a boss on the last planet that must be defeated before moving into the next cluster.

The War Griffon can traverse through the main planetary surface as well as underwater areas and interconnected tunnels. When flying through tunnels, the view changes to a first-person perspective, and the player can only rotate left and right while blocked doors can be opened by shooting at switches inside these sections. Some bodies of water can benefit or harm the player, while more enemies and obstacles are introduced in later areas. There are two special weapons available to choose from at the start, but new weapons can be obtained by finding four fragments to expand the War Griffon's arsenal. However ammunition for special weapons must be picked up, as they are not refilled after clearing a planet, while their overall capacity is increased by finding hidden expansions. Other upgrades for the War Griffon are also found through each planet.

The player can switch between third-person and first-person views, or change the camera angle into a top-down perspective. Returning from Cybermorph is Skylar, an artificial intelligence which transmits in-game information to the player such as nearby objectives. The War Griffon can collect energy pods to restore a small amount of energy, and a full recovery is done by finding an energizing ring. The player has a set number of lives at the start and game is over if all are lost, although extra lives can be found hidden in the planets. Progress is automatically saved if a Memory Track cartridge is present, otherwise players can play through the game without saving. The game features support for the ProController.

== Development ==
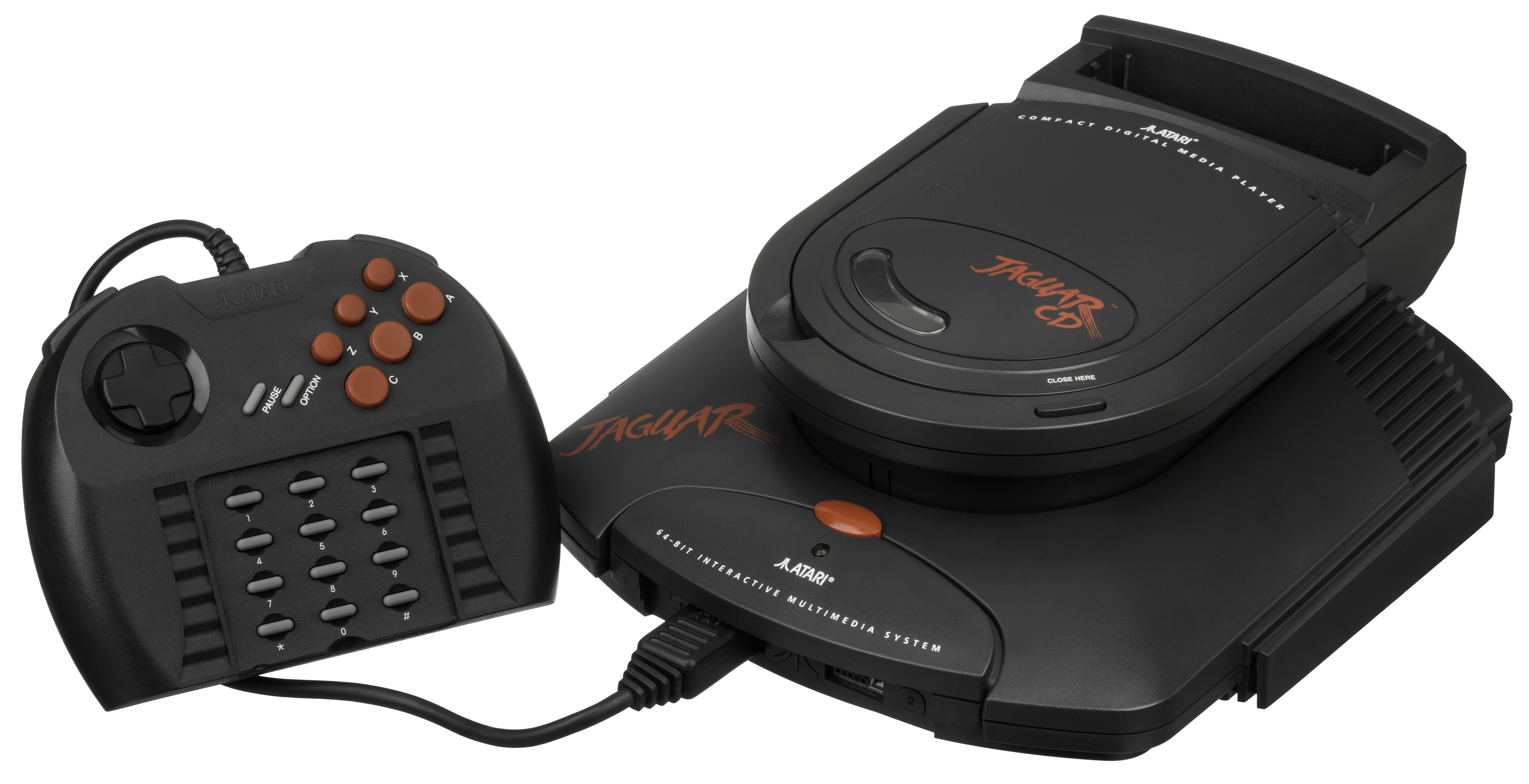
Battlemorph was one of the first titles announced for Jaguar CD. ATD used techniques learned late during development of Cybermorph to improve the overall experience

Battlemorph was developed by Attention to Detail (ATD), which previously worked on Cybermorph (1993) for Atari Jaguar and Blue Lightning (1995) for the Jaguar CD. It was produced by Sean Patten of Atari Corporation. The coding work was handled by a programmer under the pseudonym "Sadge", with technical director Fred Gill (one of the original five founding members of ATD), Andrew Holtom, and Peter Long providing additional support, while Andrew Howe was in charge of optimizations. The game's levels were co-designed by Jim McPhail and Stuart Tilley, who also worked on Cybermorph and Blue Lightning. David West, Ian G. Harling, and Joanne Surman were responsible for the artwork and 3D models. Surman was also responsible for the full-motion video cutscenes alongside Jon Baker and Vince Shaw-Morton. The soundtrack was scored by Will Davis, and features the voice work of comedian Rob Brydon and Vicky Lowe as Skylar.

According to Gill, a sequel to Cybermorph was pitched by ATD to Atari after the first game was finished and released to the market. Gill stated that the staff wanted to make a follow-up and implement ideas they were not able to include in the original game. The team also used techniques they learned late during development of Cybermorph to improve the overall experience. Both Gill and Gibbs recalled that Sam and Leonard Tramiel demanded the team to implement texture mapping into the title in response to Total Eclipse (1994) on the 3DO. However, Gill stated that "we steered away from that battle" to keep the game's frame rate between 15 and 20 frames per second. Internal documentation from Atari showed that development of the game was completed by December 11, 1995. Gill has since retrospectively commented that he would have liked to improve the performance but expressed being proud of Battlemorph.

== Release ==
Battlemorph was announced in 1994 as one of the first upcoming games for the Jaguar CD add-on. It was first showcased at the 1994 Summer Consumer Electronics Show and originally slated for a December launch. The title was then featured in a non-playable state at the 1995 Winter CES, where it was initially announced to be a pack-in game with the Jaguar CD. It also showcased in an early playable state at the 1995 ECTS Spring event and E3 1995, slated for an August release. The game was showcased during an event hosted by Atari dubbed "Fun 'n' Games Day". and covered by press invited to Atari's European offices.

Battlemorph was published in North America and Europe in December 1995. After finishing their contractual work with the Jaguar platform, Attention to Detail would go on to develop Blast Chamber (1996) for the PlayStation and Sega Saturn. In 1999, composer Will Davis released the game's soundtrack online via MP3.com. In 2020, independent publisher Songbird Productions acquired the rights to Battlemorph and announced a limited reprint alongside a music album, which were released in 2021. Songbird Productions also announced plans for a potential catridge version of the game.

== Reception ==
Reception

Review scores
Publication	Score
AllGame	4.5/5
Game Informer	7/10
Game Players	85%
M! Games	59%
Next Generation	4/5
ST Format	89%
Atari Explorer Online	5/5
Atari Fan	92/100
Atari Gaming Headquarters	8/10
Fun Generation	8/10
Game Zero Magazine	40.5/50
ST-Computer	85%
ST Magazine	76%
VideoGame Advisor	B
VideoGames	8/10

Battlemorph garnered generally favorable reception from critics. Game Players's Patrick Baggatta lauded its graphical prowess, gameplay depth, innovative environment design, and the ability to fly in any direction and travel underwater, but found the above-ground navigation problematic due to the draw distance and the aircraft's control initially difficult. GameFan's Dave Halverson and Casey Loe praised the ambient techno-style music, larger worlds, varied mission objectives, and overall improvements made over Cybermorph. Halverson called it "one of the Jag's brightest lights", though Loe acknowledged that "it won't blow anyone away with its 3-D capabilities".

VideoGames magazine commented that the game looked and played better compared to Cybermorph, citing the variety of enemies, controls, and fast-pacing. Next Generation contended that while the graphics have little detail and a short draw distance, they carry a strong sense of style and suspense, particularly in the underwater sections. They also concurred with Baggatta that the controls are imperfect but said they become easier with practice. Evan Morris and Bryan Carter of Game Zero Magazine noted the ability to dive into bodies of water and commended the game's soundtrack, diverse objectives, and controls, but criticized its limited texture mapping, intermissions, and the announcer voice.

GamePro's brief review, however, argued that "Battlemorph provides below-average terrain-skimming shooting in a typical polygon environment and features really poor control." German publication ST-Computer noted the diegetic music and frame rate, but felt that it was graphically limited. Marc Abramson of the French ST Magazine disagreed with other reviewers regarding the usage of texture mapping for objects and enemies, finding it to be an improvement over Cybermorph, while praising the scenery, intermission cutscenes, complex missions, and overall longevity.

Fun Generation's Martin Weidner and Stephan Girlich gave positive remarks to the audiovisual presentation and gameplay. MAN!AC Oliver Ehrle commended the different missions and controls, but ultimately opined that the game played identical to its predecessor. ST Format's Frank Charlton echoed similar thoughts as other critics praising the game, lauding its appealing visuals, atmospheric music, varied missions, and lack of slowdown. Atari Gaming Headquarters' Brian C. Bessemer regarded it as "an excellent sequel to Cybermorph", highlighting its replayability, audio, and lack of loading times, but did not concur with Charlton about the visuals, stating that they "just don't mix all too well."

=== Retrospective coverage ===
Retrospective commentary for Battlemorph has been equally favorable. The Atari Times' Gregory D. George found it to be a "remarkable upgrade" over Cybermorph, noting the audiovisual presentation and controls. Author Andy Slaven also highlighted the improved visuals, soundtrack, and mission variety. AllGame's Kyle Knight commented, "If you had to choose one game to demonstrate how great the Jaguar CD add-on could have been, Battlemorph would be a likely candidate." Knight referred it as one of the best games released for the Jaguar CD, lauding the graphics, the music, and the way it offers the player a variety of options for responding to attacks, achieving objectives, and exploring environments. In 2013, HobbyConsolas identified Battlemorph as one of the twenty best games for the platform. In 2023, Time Extension also listed it as one of the best games for the Jaguar.
