= Eco: East Africa =

- Developer: Viridis Corporation
- Publisher: IVI Publishing
- Platform: Windows
- Release: 1995
- Genre: Business simulation
- Mode: Single-player

Eco: East Africa is a business simulation video game developed by American studio Viridis Corporation and published by IVI Publishing for Windows in 1995.

== Gameplay ==
Eco: East Africa is a game in which the player is a conservation officer who has been hired to revive a failing African game park.

== Development ==
Eco: East Africa was developed by Viridis Corporation. Based in Los Angeles, the company focused support on the Phillips CD-i before branching out into PC games in 1994. The project manager for Eco: East Africa was Jesyca Durchin, who started in the entertainment industry in 1991 working as a production assistant to filmmaker Tim Burton. Durchin stated that she began with Viridis when they were working on a CD-i game about recovering the RMS Titanic and then switched to a simulation set in Africa. She recalled, "I was hired on to be an assistant, but the producer didn't really know how to organize and produce. He was a really good programmer and technologist. And so, we kind of switched roles, and I ended up spending about a year and a half producing a simulation. Which is actually one of the hardest things to do in software, period. Which was my first CD-ROM. And it was a mess"

Eco: East Africa was one of five titles announced in a distribution agreement with IVI Publishing. Durchin claimed that she was under immense pressure from IVI to complete the game ahead of the holiday season. By April 1995, the publisher pulled out of its contract with Viridis leading to massive layoffs for the latter company. Viridis ultimately folded due to lack of income leaving Durchin and her team unpaid for six weeks following the game's release. Eco: East Africa features music from the Nigerian Talking Drum Ensemble.

== Reception ==
Reception

Review scores
Publication	Score
Computer Game Review	77/100
Next Generation	2/5
PC Gamer (US)	63%
Dimension-3	83%
Electronic Entertainment	3.4/5
Electronic Games	B+

Next Generation rated the game two stars out of five, and stated that "Exploring your park is kind of entertaining, but only for a very short while. Hey, once you've seen one pack of hyenas feasting on a carcass or an elephant loping across the screen, you've pretty much seen them all. And you'll be way too tied down with administrative duties to do much sight-seeing anyway." Computer Game Review's Tasos Kaiafas called the game "not very educational, interesting or fun."

The game received the "Four Star Award of Excellence" from Home PC Magazine.
