= Jay Samit =

American businessman (born 1961)

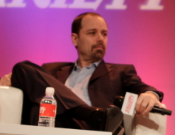
- Jay Alan Samit
- Born: January 31, 1961 (age 65); Philadelphia, Pennsylvania, United States
- Education: UCLA
- Children: Two

Jay Samit (born January 31, 1961) is the former Independent Vice Chairman of Deloitte Digital. He is the author of the books Disrupt You! Master Personal Transformation, Seize Opportunity, and Thrive in the Era of Endless Innovation and Future Proofing You - Twelve Truths for Creating Opportunity, Maximizing Wealth, and Controlling Your Destiny in an Uncertain World.

== Career ==
=== Jasmine Multimedia Publishing ===
Samit was a recipient of the Presidential fellowship at UCLA where he graduated magna cum laude in 1982. The same year, Samit founded Jasmine Multimedia Publishing where he created some of the breakthrough laserdisc and CD-ROM titles that defined the emergence of video and music on the personal computer, including the first video on a PC. Jasmine's technological breakthroughs include creating the first interactive videodisc arcade game in 1982 and the first laserdisc-based interactive movie theater for the 1984 Louisiana World Exposition. Partnering with leading technology firms such as IBM, Microsoft, and Intel, Samit published over 300 titles ranging from Inside the Vatican to Wild West to the award-winning Vid Grid with David Geffen. Samit and his innovations at Jasmine Multimedia received numerous awards, including Best of Show COMDEX, Best of RetailVision, Best of E3, Multimedia Producer Top 100, and Newsweek’s Editor’s Choice Award.

=== Universal Studios New Media Group ===
After Jasmine Multimedia Publishing was acquired, Samit was brought on as the first head of business development for Universal Studios in the New Media Group. Later, as VP of Universal Studios' New Media arm, Samit developed a number of content driven opportunities for the company to make their new media initiative profitable. In 1998, he created the first million-member social media site for college students called animalhouse.com, which was the first online community to feature free web-based email, VOIP, and ecommerce. Animalhouse.com was hailed as “the leading online community for college students” by Variety in 1999.

=== EMI Recorded Music (Capitol Records) ===
In April 1999, Samit joined EMI (Capitol Records) as Executive Vice President of New Media and rose to Global President of Digital Distribution. Under Samit’s leadership, EMI was able to make the company’s entire music catalog Internet-ready. With the goal of being the “first digital label,” Samit led EMI’s strategy to make money by signing deals aimed at developing and owning the technology to distribute music over the Internet and wireless networks. As noted in Wired, the “venture-capital strategy paid big dividends” and EMI “realized a substantial gain in operating profit by using its technology investments wisely” by quadrupling its stock price.

Samit was recognized for his expertise in “untangling technological and legal knots," enabling EMI to sell traditional content in new digital formats. Under Samit, EMI became the first record label to offer digital albums for sale (David Bowie Hours), win a Grammy for a digital release (Lenny Kravitz's Dig In), sign the Beatles to their first digital distribution deal, and record and distribute mobile ringtones. According to Variety, when Samit joined EMI in 1999, EMI had a "negligible Internet presence" but soon became "arguably the most innovative music major spearheading the shift into digital distribution."

At the time, the music industry was encouraged to follow EMI's digital model. In 2001, Samit was quoted in Forbes magazine in response to criticism about the music industry's slow transition to digital music distribution. He said, "My job is to make buying music easier than stealing it. It's faster and easier to rob a liquor store than it is to build a grocery store, which is what we're doing."

Samit led EMI Recorded Music to receive an RIAA honorary Gold Record, marking the first time a CD available only on the Internet was given this honor. Samit also won Music Executive of the Year at Gavin's first ever Wammy Awards in 2000. Samit sat on the boards of Musicmaker, Musicnet (MediaNet), Pressplay (Napster), OD2, and Loudeye.

=== Sony ===
Samit left EMI to join Sony, where he was the creator and general manager of Sony Connect and later executive vice president. As Sony, once the biggest player in the portable audio market, was quickly losing market share to Apple and the iPod, Samit was brought in to launch Sony's online music store and "bridge the gap between Sony's engineers in Tokyo and its music team in the United States." According to The New York Times, Sony's digital music initiative was seen as "a way to unite the sometimes conflicting electronics and content divisions."

To promote the launch of Sony Connect, Samit executive-produced the first ever in-flight concert at 30,000 feet featuring Sheryl Crow. He also executive produced 350 live concert and in-studio sessions for exclusive digital tracks ranging from Crosby & Nash and John Legend, to Kelly Clarkson and Train.

Samit has been called a "guru for the entire industry" by Variety and, according to Wired, the guy with "the coolest job in the industry" for dreaming up new ways for Hollywood to capitalize on emerging media.”

=== SocialVibe ===
From 2009-2012, Samit was the CEO of SocialVibe, a digital advertising technology company for some of the world's biggest brands. During his tenure, SocialVibe developed partnerships with major sites like Facebook, Zynga, Pandora, The Huffington Post, IMVU, Zinio and Causes.

=== ooVoo ===
Samit served as president of ooVoo, a web-based video chat app. ooVoo was awarded the 2013 Best App Technology by Appster, the “Best of the Year” distinction in 2011 and named 2012 Venture Summit Company of the Year.

=== SeaChange International ===
Samit served as CEO of SeaChange International, the world's leading provider of multi-screen video products and services that facilitate the aggregation, licensing, management, and distribution of video programs and television advertisements to cable system operators, telecommunications companies, mobile communications providers and media companies worldwide. SeaChange pioneered the field of Video on Demand and won a number of awards, including three Emmy Awards in the category Technology & Engineering and in the Technology Services Industry Associations STAR award in 2015.

=== Published writings ===
In addition to his books, Samit has written articles and columns about entrepreneurship, technological innovation, and disruption for publications such as the Wall Street Journal, Fortune, Forbes, Ad Age, Harvard Business Review, and Wired. He worked with Ralph Nader on the book Selecting a President. In college, he was presented the Society of Professional Journalists (SPJ) Sigma Delta Chi top national award honor for Spot News reporting.

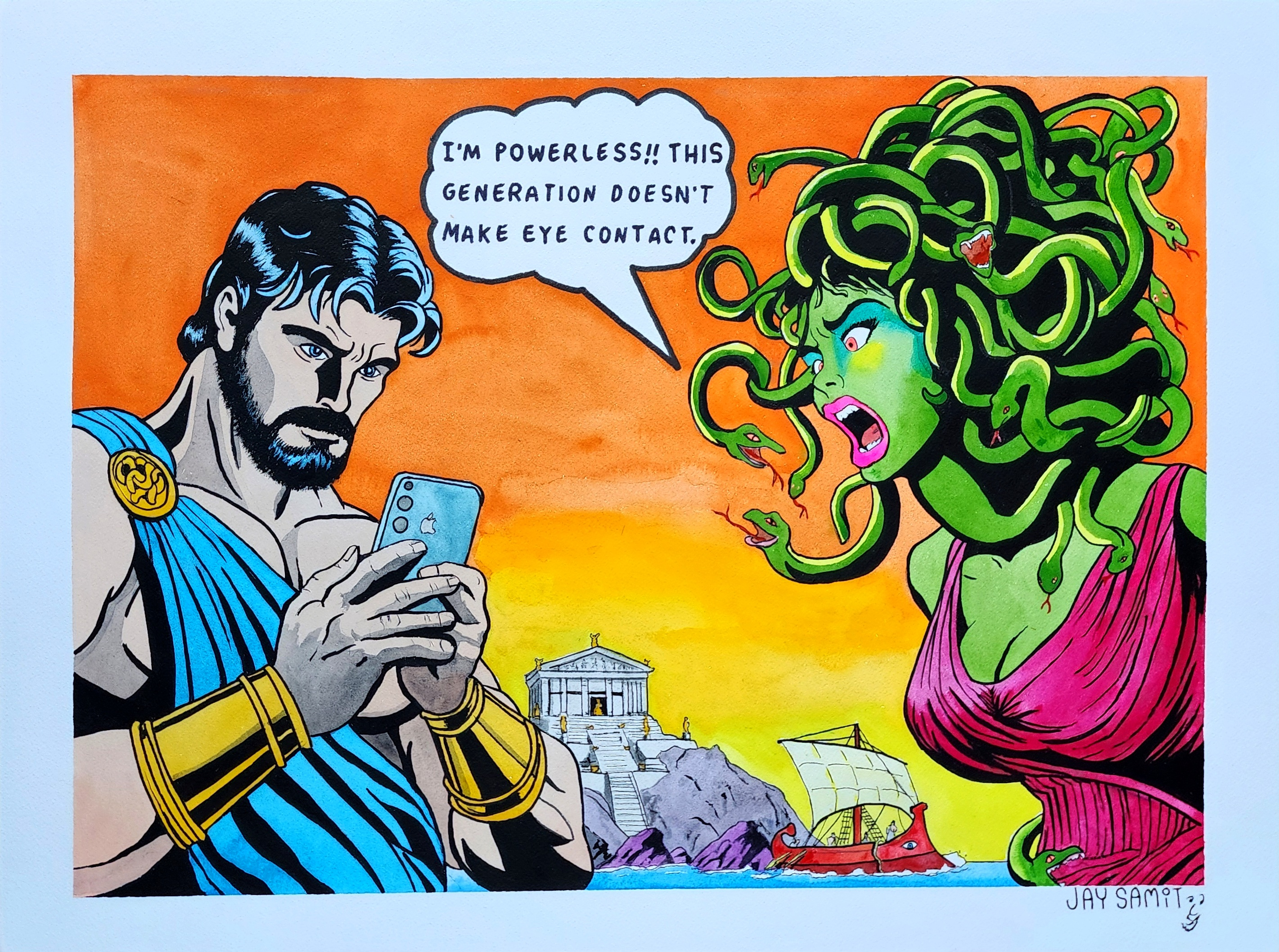
I'm Powerless - Jay Samit Watercolor 2024

=== Paintings ===
Samit paints with watercolors, predominantly in a Pop Art style. His subject matter explores the tension between technology and humanity by combining comic book imagery with social commentary.

In 2020, Richard Taittinger Gallery presented his inaugural New York solo exhibition, America Disrupted, featuring a series of watercolors painted during the COVID-19 quarantine.

Samit's 2022 show Dots & Pixels centered on digital commodification.

== Other ==
Samit is a member of the Writers Guild of America, the Academy of Television Arts & Sciences and a performing member of the Magic Castle (Academy of Magical Arts). According to Variety, he "put himself through college with magic, an art he still practices." He was also the host of the popular Wall Street Journal documentary series Startup of the Year.

== Philanthropy ==
Samit was appointed to the White House's initiative for education and technology by President Bill Clinton and Vice President Al Gore, where he helped gain Internet access for the nation's schools. Through this program, Samit spearheaded the Internet's first auction, a Net-a-thon fundraiser, benefiting the National Education Technology Initiative. Samit also helped produce charity concerts including Tsunami Aid and Katrina Relief.

Samit is an adjunct professor at University of Southern California's Viterbi School of Engineering and teaches a course in building high-tech startups.
