= Cybermorph =

1993 video game

- Standalone cover art in all regions by B.J. West
- Developer: Attention to Detail
- Publisher: Atari Corporation
- Producers: John Skruch; Sean Patten
- Designers: Andrew Keim; Faran Thomason; Hans Jacobsen; Joe Sousa
- Programmers: Brian Pollock; Fred Gill
- Artists: B. J. West; Chris Gibbs; Ian G. Harling
- Composers: Andrew Holtom; David Lowe; Ted Tahquechi
- Platform: Atari Jaguar
- Release: NA: November 23, 1993; EU: June 1994; JP: December 15, 1994
- Genre: Shooter
- Mode: Single-player

Cybermorph is a shooter video game developed by Attention to Detail (ATD) and published by Atari Corporation as the pack-in game for the Atari Jaguar in North America on November 23, 1993, and Europe in June 1994. It was also distributed in Japan by Mumin Corporation as a stand-alone release. Taking place in a galactic war, the player pilots the morphing attack fighter TransmoGriffon to battle against the Pernitia empire, who have conquered planets on multiple sectors and whose regenerative robotic technology become entrenched into the planets. The player is tasked with recapturing critical pods, while facing against enemies and bosses, across five sectors in order to defeat the empire.

Attention to Detail were approached by Jon Dean in regards to the Konix Multisystem, working alongside Flare Technology on the operating system, development tools, and demos. One of the demos created by ATD was a 3D landscape, which was based on David Braben's Zarch. It became the basis for Cybermorph, as Atari liked the demo and approached ATD to produce demos for the Jaguar. Atari's testing department was tasked with designing levels and structures, while ATD worked with them to lay down the terrain and enemies in order to implement them into the game. Production proved challenging, as ATD were finishing the game while the hardware was being finalized.

Cybermorph divided critics; some found the pod-collecting gameplay to be dull and repetitive, while others saw it as varied and challenging. Its graphics were generally regarded as a disappointment given the Jaguar's capabilities, while the audio was seen as a bigger disappointment. The more positive commentaries tended to emphasize its gameplay rather than its audio-visual performance, while unfavorable comparisons to Star Fox on Super NES came up frequently in reviews. It was reissued in 1994 as a one-megabyte cartridge, with several features missing compared to the original two-megabyte version from 1993. By 1995, the stand-alone release had sold fewer than 2,000 copies. It was followed by Battlemorph (1995) on Atari Jaguar CD. In 2022, the game was included as part of the Atari 50 compilation.

== Gameplay and premise ==
Gameplay screenshot

Cybermorph is a three-dimensional shooter game played from a third-person perspective. The plot takes place in a galactic war, where the Pernitia empire have conquered planets on multiple sectors and whose regenerative robotic technology become entrenched into the planets. The resistance developed new weapons to overthrow the empire but were intercepted and placed into pods scattered throughout various planets. The pods also contain information, supplies, and cryogenically suspended members of the resistance. The player is tasked with piloting the TransmoGriffon (T-Griffon), a morphing attack fighter prototype employing similar technology to that used by the empire, which is transported by interstellar cruisers and only usable on the planetary surface. It is also equipped with Skylar, an artificial intelligence designed to transmit information.

The main objective of the game is to recapture critical pods, while facing an assortment of enemies, in order to defeat the empire. There are 50 levels in total, each divided into eight planets across five sectors. The player can select a planet, each one showing a mission briefing before being launched into the location. The player must retrieve a pre-determined number of pods, which will open an exit and move into the next planet. The player can also explore each planet to uncover secrets. Some planets feature obstacles such as antimatter vortex towers that destroy pods brought by pod carriers, and the player is forced to abort the mission if enough pods are destroyed. After completing each planet, a boss must be fought before moving to the next sector. Other obstacles are introduced in later sectors like teleporters that warps the player into unreachable areas, as well as force fields which block a particular area and spikes that protect pods. These can be disabled by destroying their respective generators.

Weapons and super weapons are randomly dropped by enemies and cargo carriers when shot down, which expands the T-Griffon's arsenal and can be restocked. Enemies can also drop items such as rapid fire and coins for bonus points. The T-Griffon changes its shape depending on the player's actions and selected weapons. The player can toggle a targeting reticle, switch between camera angles, or changes the perspective from third-person into first-person. Crashing into enemies and mountains damages the ship, while crashing into buildings either on front or reverse instantly destroys the T-Griffon. The player starts with two lives and more can be obtained by finding "X" icons, but the game is over if all are lost.

== Development ==
Cybermorph was developed by Attention to Detail (ATD), a British game developer co-founded in 1988 by University of Birmingham graduates Chris Gibbs, Fred Gill, Martin Green, Jon Steele and Jim Torjussen. The group had previously worked on the Amiga and Atari ST conversions of Super Sprint for Activision, Octan (1987) for ZX Spectrum, and Night Shift (1990). It was co-produced by John Skruch and Sean Patten of Atari Corporation. Patten also acted as co-level designer and co-tester along with Andrew Keim, Faran Thomason, Hans Jacobsen, Joe Sousa, Shimmy Brandes, Stuart Tilley, Ted Tahquechi, and testing manager Tom Gillen. Gill served as co-programmer alongside sub-contractor Brian Pollock, who also created the game's 3D engine and proprietary map editor. Gibbs, B.J. West, and Ian G. Harling were responsible for the artwork. The game's audio was handled by Tahquechi, Andrew Holtom, and composer David Lowe. Victoria Lowe, Wife of David Lowe provided voicework for Skylar.

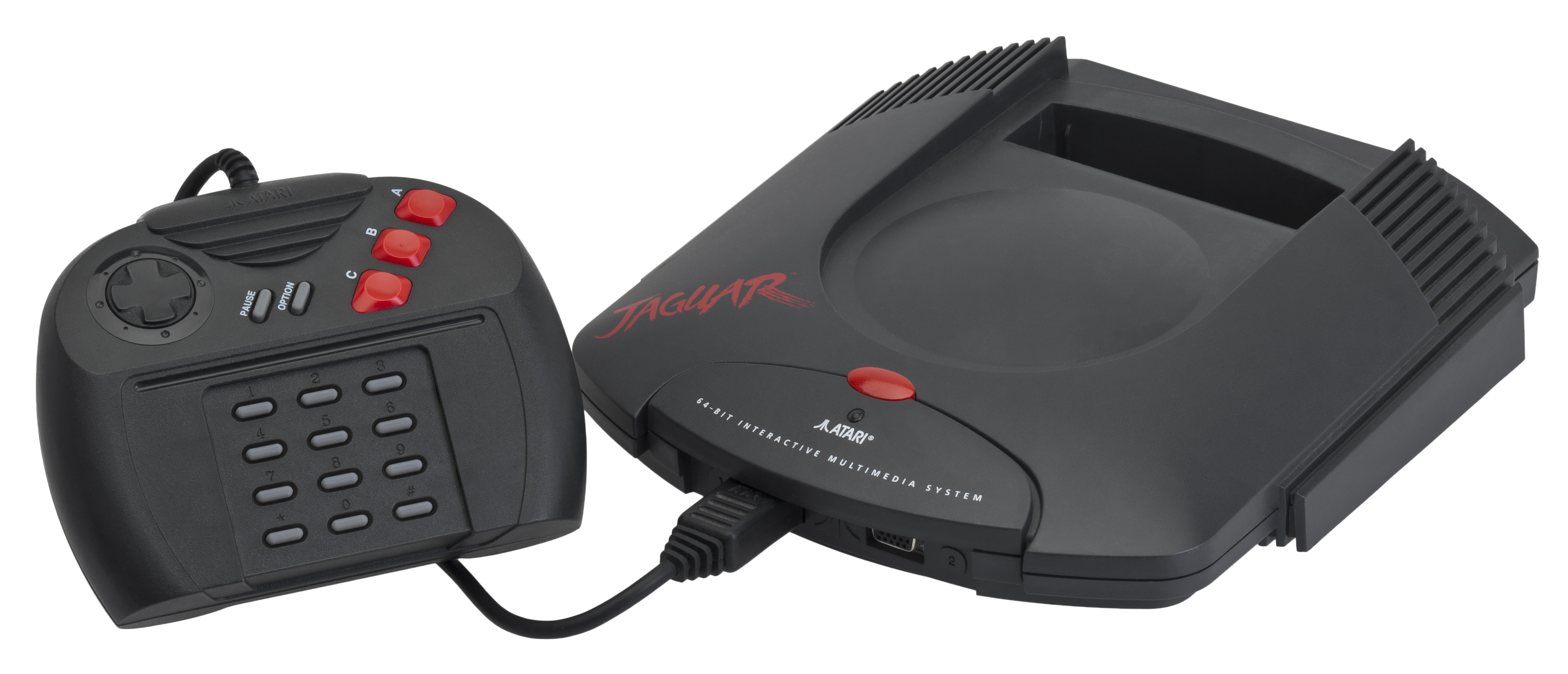
The landscape demo by Attention to Detail for the Konix Multisystem became the basis for Cybermorph on Atari Jaguar

The ATD team were approached by their mentor Jon Dean for work on the Atari 2600 (VCS) and began production on a prototype but it was cancelled. Dean later approached the group in regards to the then-upcoming Konix Multisystem, working along with Flare Technology on the operating system, development tools to make development easy and attract third-party developers, and demos. One of the demos created by ATD for the Konix Multisystem was a flying carpet-esque 3D landscape, which was based on David Braben's Zarch (also known as Virus) and written from scratch in 11 days. It became the basis for Cybermorph, as Atari liked the demo and initially approached ATD to produce demos for the then-upcoming Atari Jaguar. The game entered production at the same time as Trevor McFur in the Crescent Galaxy.

When showcased in Atari's US offices, the game was in a basic state consisting of only the ship flying and a rudimentary terrain. Atari's testing department was tasked with designing levels and structures while ATD worked closely with them to laid down the terrain and enemies via Pollock's map editor in order to implement them into the game. The program would convert the map into a seed value for a fractal algorithm, which is entered along with color information and object positioning to generate the three-dimensional playfield. Sousa designed eight of the game's levels and named two of them after his daughters by mixing their letters to create new names. Patten stated that bringing the testing team to design the game resulted in a lot of work, but felt that doing so resulted in making Cybermorph a "much better game in the long run". West was brought in at the end of the production to create artwork for both the cover art and ending sequence. West originally produced more elaborate animation sequences for the game's introduction and ending, but these were distilled into static images instead due to memory constraints.

Cybermorph makes use of various features within the Jaguar such as Z-buffering, which was used to draw multiple enemies and various effects in the game. Z-buffering is also used to handle drawing of all the objects and the planetary terrain. The game runs between 10 and 18 frames per second, displaying around 400 to 600 polygons on-screen. Gouraud shading is used as light source for the polygon models, while the system's Motorola 68000 is used to move objects in the game. Production proved challenging, as ATD were finishing the game while the hardware was being finalized. Before release, a hardware bug was discovered that caused the game to crash, which required a workaround to integrate a fix into the Jaguar's final production run. Gill felt that the 68000 chip was a limiting factor, but ultimately liked working with the Jaguar's hardware due to its flexibility and has since retrospectively expressed being proud of Cybermorph.

== Release ==
Cybermorph was unveiled as one of the first games for the Atari Jaguar at a press conference held by Atari Corporation on August 18, 1993, running on an Atari TT030-based Jaguar development system. It was released by Atari in North America on November 23, 1993, as the pack-in game for the Jaguar. Trevor McFur in the Crescent Galaxy was initially slated to be the pack-in game until Atari chose Cybermorph instead. In 1994, it was reissued as a one-megabyte (1MB) cartridge, with missing features compared to the original two-megabyte (2MB) version from 1993 such as the introductory animation sequence and music, as well as fewer voice samples. The cut content was a cost-effective measure made by Atari to boost sales of the Jaguar, a process which took Attention to Detail approximately two hours to fit the game on a 1MB cartridge. It was then released in Europe in June 1994, and later published in Japan by Mumin Corporation as a stand-alone release on December 15. In Spain, the game was distributed by Products Final. In 1995, the game's trademark was abandoned. In 2022, the game was included as part of the Atari 50 compilation for Nintendo Switch, PlayStation 4, Windows (via Steam), and Xbox One, marking its first re-release.

== Reception ==
Reception

Review scores
Publication	Score
Computer and Video Games	79/100
Edge	8/10
Game Informer	8.5/10
GamesMaster	78/100
Hyper	83%
ST Format	87%
ST Review	88%
Atari ST User	95%
Digital Press	3/10
Electronic Games	B
Games World	64/100
VideoGames	8/10

Award
Publication	Award
GameFan (1993)	Viewpoint Game of the Month.

Cybermorph divided critics. Some found the pod-collecting gameplay to be dull and repetitive, while others saw it as varied and challenging due to the number of different enemies and obstacles. The usage of Gouraud shading was widely praised, but the graphics were generally regarded as a disappointment given the Atari Jaguar's capabilities, due primarily to the simplistic, untextured shapes. Unfavorable comparisons to Star Fox on Super NES also came up frequently in reviews; Digital Press' Joe Santulli, for example, remarked that "Starfox is ten times better than this game – and Silpheed, a game that I really thought was all glitz, is easily superior to Cybermorph in terms of graphics and sound. So what gives here?"

The audio came as a bigger disappointment than the graphics, with several critics complaining at the absence of in-game music and the sound effects, which they found dated even by the standards of the previous generation. Electronic Gaming Monthly's four reviewers particularly emphasized the audio's poor quality. A few critics felt the game successfully delivered on the Jaguar's promise; Atari ST User's Simon Clays wrote that "I've never been overcome in quite the manner I was when I saw Cybermorph. More than anything it demonstrated the sheer power of the machine and its immediate superiority to anything else you'll see." Some critics opined that in-game music was not called for, as it would have become annoying over the lengthy campaigns and detracted from the game's atmosphere.

Otherwise, the more positive reviews tended to emphasize its gameplay rather than its audio-visual performance. Edge magazine added that "it's gameplay that counts and Cybermorph has nothing to fear in that department. From the first firebutton press, it's pretty much non-stop action, and even though there's no timer, the game comes with a built-in sense of panic as you attempt to scoop up all the pods and haul ass outta there." GamePro's Boss Music had a more mixed reaction, citing an intriguing gameplay concept but repetitive action, blocky and untextured graphics, and deterring challenge level. The title received a "Viewpoint Game Of the Month" award from GameFan, who also gave it one of its most enthusiastic reviews. They lauded the open world environments, level design, length, and real-time 3D graphics. Internal documentation from Atari Corporation showed that the stand-alone release had sold fewer than 2,000 copies by April 1, 1995. In 1996, ST Format regarded it as one of the ten best games for Jaguar.

=== Retrospective coverage ===
Retrospective commentary for Cybermorph has been equally divisive. MyAtari's Robert Jung commended the game's password system, on-screen displays, fast and complex polygonal graphics, and coloring effects provided by the Gouraud shading. Nevertheless, Jung noted that its pacing will not appeal to everyone and also found the inability to change difficulty, the computer Skylar, and audio as shortcomings. Author Andy Slaven expressed that the game had not aged well compared to its follow-up Battlemorph. Slaven found the game's flat-shaded environments devoid of features and deemed its sound effects and voiceovers to be outdated. The Atari Times's Brendan Onfrichuk regarded Cybermorph as a fun game and found the pod-collecting gameplay reminiscent of Defender (1981). Onfrichuk also gave favorable remarks to its audiovisual presentation and controls. Christian Roth and Nils of the German website neXGam highlighted Skylar's voiceovers and overall length of the game but criticized the visuals for their short draw distance and sluggish action. Retro Gamer's Sam Heffernan noted that the game's audio "still stand up well", but disapproved of its plain graphics. In 2023, Time Extension listed it as one of the best games for the Jaguar.

== Legacy ==
A sequel to Cybermorph was pitched by Attention to Detail to Atari Corporation after the first game was finished and released to the market. The staff wanted to make a follow-up and implement ideas they were not able to include in the original game, while also using techniques they learned late during development of Cybermorph to improve the overall experience. Battlemorph was announced in 1994 as one of the first upcoming games for the Atari Jaguar CD add-on. It was published in North America and Europe in December 1995.

In 2008, the source code of Cybermorph was released by hobbyist community Jaguar Sector II under a CD compilation called Jaguar Source Code Collection. Skylar appears as a boss on the stage "Future Fuckballs 2010" in the game Angry Video Game Nerd Adventures (2013) for Nintendo 3DS, Wii U, and Windows (via Steam).
