= Blue Lightning (1995 video game) =

1995 combat flight simulator game

- Cover art by Steve Lang
- Developer: Attention to Detail
- Publisher: Atari Corporation
- Producer: Sean Patten
- Designer: Stuart Tilley
- Programmers: Andrew Howe; Jon Howard
- Artists: David West; Ian G. Harling; Joanne Surman; Kristi-Louise Herd
- Composers: Ian Sharp; Will Davis
- Platform: Atari Jaguar CD
- Release: NA/EU: September 21, 1995
- Genres: Combat flight simulator, shoot 'em up
- Mode: Single-player

Blue Lightning is a 1995 combat flight simulator video game developed by Attention to Detail and published by Atari Corporation for the Atari Jaguar CD. It is a conversion of Epyx's 1989 Atari Lynx title of the same name, and one of the pack-in games for the Jaguar CD. In the game, the player assumes the role of a rookie fighter pilot from the Blue Lightning squadron, taking control of multiple military aircraft across various missions to stop general Drako, who betrayed the United Nations and gained power of military organizations through corruption to expand his organized crime empire all over the world.

Blue Lightning was announced in 1994 as one of the first upcoming titles for the Jaguar CD add-on, being advertised as a sequel to the Lynx original, but went through a troubled development cycle. Attention to Detail faced problems when making the game at the same time the Jaguar CD hardware was being finalized, with the staff not understanding how gameplay from the original game worked when recreating it for Jaguar. The game garnered a mixed reception from critics and retrospective commentators; most felt divided regarding the audiovisual presentation while criticism was geared towards its gameplay, which was compared unfavorably with the original game, After Burner (1987), and Air Combat (1995).

== Gameplay ==
Blue Lightning is an arcade-style combat flight simulator game played from a third-person perspective, similar to the original game on Atari Lynx and After Burner (1987), in which the player assumes the role of a fighter pilot from the titular squadron. The plot revolves around General Drako, who worked for the United Nations using their military personnel to maintain peace around the world, but slowly gained control and power of military organizations to expand his organized crime empire across the globe. U.N. leaders were surprised by Drako's betrayal and actions had to be taken. Members from the Blue Lightning squadron joined Drako's corrupted ranks, while the remaining loyal forces eager a chance to overthrow the criminal group. The U.N. recurred to the squadron and assigned a rookie pilot of the force to stop Drako. The player can choose any save slot to keep their progress, customize it with a portrait picture, and select one of three difficulty levels when starting the game. The player can also access the options screen to change configurations such as controls and other settings.

Gameplay screenshot

The main objective of the game is to complete a series of missions across various continents such as Australia, Europe, North America, Russia, and South America, in order to defeat general Drako and his army. The player is first assigned with a group of training missions in preparation for the main "Tour of Duty" missions. Each mission increases in difficulty as the game progress further. After completing every tour mission, the player is then assigned to a "final tour" and sent to the Arctic where most of Drako's army resides. Progress is automatically saved after completing a continent if a Memory Track cartridge is present, otherwise players can play through the game without saving. Before starting a mission, a briefing screen explaining the current situation in the selected "Tour" location is shown, which lists the objective for each of the four missions on the selected area. There are five types of assignments in the game such as aerial, escort, and ground missions.

The player can choose from seven fighter planes instead of being settled with only one plane as in the original game, each one having their own advantages and disadvantages, but the player must complete the training missions first before gaining access to the other aircraft. During gameplay, the player's plane can fire its machine gun or a limited number of missiles to use against enemy units. In ground missions, the player is given access to three types of bombs. The player can toggle between third-person and first-person views, perform an aleron roll to minimize damage from enemy fire, and activate the plane's afterburner for a short speed boost. The planes also act as lives, and the game is over if all of them are crashed or destroyed, though extra planes can be obtained by either completing the chosen set of missions or reaching a certain score.

== Development ==
Blue Lightning for the Atari Jaguar CD is a conversion of Epyx's 1989 Atari Lynx title of the same name. It was developed by British studio Attention to Detail (ATD), which previously worked on Cybermorph (1993) for the Jaguar. It was produced by Sean Patten of Atari Corporation, with John Skruch acting as assistant producer. The coding work was handled by Andrew Howe and Jon Howard, with technical director Fred Gill (one of the original five founding members of ATD), Peter Long, and a programmer under the pseudonym "Sadge" providing additional support. The game's levels were co-designed by a member credited under the nickname "Mac" and Stuart "F. B." Tilley, who also worked on Cybermorph. David West, Ian G. Harling, Joanne Surman, and Kristi-Louise Herd were responsible for the artwork, while the full-motion video cutscenes were handled by Jon Baker and Vince Shaw-Morton. Herd previously worked at Imagitec Design on conversions for microcomputers, before departing to join ATD and work as graphic artist on the game. The soundtrack was scored by Ian Sharp, with Will Davis composing additional music. It features the voice work of comedian Rob Brydon, lead tester Hank Cappa and Carrie Tahquechi, who portrayed some of the in-game radio transmissions at Atari's in-house audio department. The cover art was illustrated by Steve Lang.

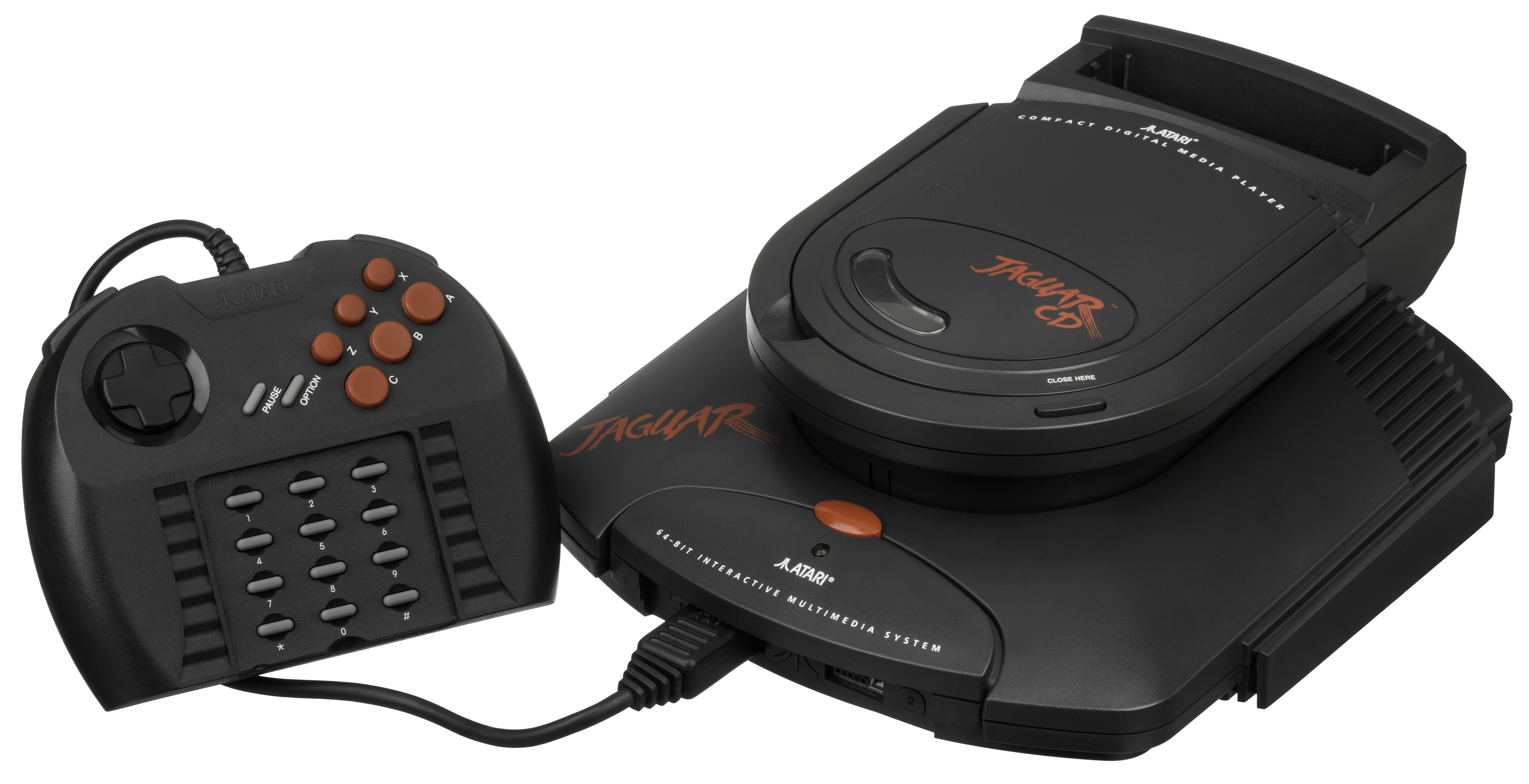
Blue Lightning was one of the first titles announced for Jaguar CD, but went through a troubled development to coincide with the add-on's release.

Gill stated the team underestimated how much work the project would bring to them while ATD expanded into multiple teams, as they had many problems when developing Blue Lightning at the same time the Jaguar CD hardware was being finished and not understanding how gameplay from the original game worked when recreating it for Jaguar. Tilley recalled building the levels using MS-DOS, drawing them by typing a letter on the keyboard in a pattern that equated to objects such as large rocks and tanks. Herd claimed that ATD hired both an aircraft and a flight suit for a photo shoot, where the game's staff dressed as fighter pilots and used photos from the session as portraits for the pilot selection screen. Herd also stated that the background graphics were digitized images while sprites were produced from pre-rendered 3D models, which caused her discontent with both ATD and the project, calling the scanned backgrounds "awful" and left the company as a result. Herd has since retrospectively referred the game's development as "the one which gave me the most headaches", but also as one of the titles she would like to rework.

== Release ==
In 1993, Atari requested several Epyx titles in order to be converted and release on Atari Jaguar, with Blue Lightning among the list of selected titles to be remade. The game was announced along with Battlemorph in 1994 under the name Blue Lightning 2 as one of the first upcoming games for the Jaguar CD add-on. It was first showcased with its final title, Blue Lightning, in a very early state at the 1994 ECTS Autumn event, and then at the 1994 Summer Consumer Electronics Show. It was later shown at the 1995 Winter CES, the 1995 ECTS Spring event, and E3 1995. The game was initially slated for an August release, and was covered by the press that were invited to Atari, It was also showcased during an event hosted by Atari dubbed "Fun 'n' Games Day", where it was formally revealed to be one of the pack-in games with the Jaguar CD. The game was published by Atari in North America and Europe on September 21.

== Reception ==
Reception

Review scores
Publication	Score
AllGame	1/5
Electronic Gaming Monthly	9/40
Game Players	72%
GameFan	71/100
M! Games	28%
Mega Fun	34%
Next Generation	3/5
Atari Gaming Headquarters	2/10
Electronic Entertainment	1/5
Fusion	4/5
Game Zero Magazine	26.0/50
ST Magazine	53%
VideoGames	8/10

Blue Lightning on the Atari Jaguar CD garnered a mixed reception from critics. Game Players' Jeff Lundrigan commended the variety of terrains, Top Gun-inspired soundtrack, and number of planes to choose from, but faulted its "blocky" bitmap visuals and repetitive gameplay, which was compared with After Burner. Lundrigan also expressed that outside of the pre-rendered cutscnenes and soundtrack "there's really nothing to distinguish this as a CD-ROM game." GameFan's three reviewers highlighted its introduction sequence, missions, and garage rock-style music, but criticized the "chunky" graphics and compared it unfavorably with Air Combat (1995). Next Generation also compared it with After Burner but noted its variety of selectable planes and fast action.

Game Zero Magazine's two reviewers commended the cinematics but found its gameplay too linear and similar to the Lynx original. They agreed with Lundrigan, commenting "there was nothing in this game justifying CD-ROM, and nothing graphically impressive." GamePro's Lawrence Neves regarded it as a mediocre title, faulting the background visuals and clunky controls. Neves also felt its gameplay was slow compared to After Burner and Starblade. In contrast, VideoGames' Jim Loftus found the graphics admirable though not near to Sega Saturn or PlayStation standards, the hard rock soundtrack fitting but muffled, and its playability addictive. Fusion's John Wesley Hardin disagreed with Loftus, stating that "it just doesn't make a good game for a CD system in 1995."

Electronic Gaming Monthly's four writers echoed similar thoughts, criticizing the audiovisual presentation, slow gameplay, choppy technical performance, and controls. While the different style of aircraft were seen as an appealing addition, they recommended the original Lynx game instead. Marc Abramson of the French ST Magazine commended its animated sequences and digitized sound, but ultimately found the game average. MAN!AC's Robert Bannert lambasted the game's audio and visuals. AllGame's Kyle Knight shared a similar opinion as other reviewers, criticizing the graphical presentation for its poor use of sprite scaling and low frame rate, as well as the repetitive soundtrack, voice acting, controls, and poor gameplay. Atari Gaming Headquarters' Keita Iida concurred with Knight, writing that "Blue Lightning for the JagCD is neither the hardware showcase that its portable wonder was, nor does it possess half the gameplay that Lynx BL offered."

=== Retrospective coverage ===
Retrospective commentary for Blue Lightning on Jaguar CD has been equally mixed. Author Andy Slaven wrote that the game "looks, sounds, and plays just like a bad 16-bit cart." Slaven also questioned Atari for choosing it as a pack-in game with the peripheral, commenting that Battlemorph would have been a better choice. The Atari Times' Dan Loosen found its gameplay fun but underwhelming and the soundtrack fitting, but gave negative comments towards the visuals. Loosen also agreed with Slaven, stating that Battlemorph should have been a pack-in game with the Jaguar CD. Nils of the German website neXGam gave the title a very mixed retrospective outlook.
