= Appster =

Defunct mobile app development company (2011–2018)

- Type: Private
- Industry: App development
- Founded: 2011
- Area served: Worldwide
- Website: www.appster.com.au

Appster was an Australian mobile app development company, founded in 2011 by Josiah Humphrey and Mark McDonald. Appster developed mobile apps and websites for startup companies, and enterprises. The company was once touted as the "next Apple" by analysts due to its fast growth. However Appster later collapsed and went into liquidation, on 7 December 2018.

== History ==
Appster was launched in June 2011 by 19-year-olds Mark McDonald and Josiah Humphrey, with $50,000 originally as a digital agency consulting to online e-commerce companies on conversion rate optimization. It soon evolved into a software-development and digital product strategy firm.

During 2011 they hired over 15 staff in Melbourne, Australia and completed over 20 apps.

In 2014, Appster had over 100 staff globally. The company opened an office in San Francisco with 5 full-time staff and estimated revenues in the Australian market of $10 million.

By 2015 the partners appeared on the AFR Young Rich List with a combined net worth of $58 million. They were also included in Forbes' "30 Under 30" list.

February 2015, Appster partnered with Hobart's New Town High school in Tasmania to give students a hands-on experience coding and designing gaming apps.

When the company failed, it had over $19 million in revenue yearly with 400 employees in four international offices.

On 7 December 2018, Appster announced that it collapsed because of failed projects and entered liquidation proceedings. Several business owners were owed hundreds of thousands of dollars at the time of the collapse. More than 200 people were unemployed and the company failed to honor its employment contract with its employees. No employee was paid any salaries or dues The administrator of the liquidation, Paul Vartelas of BK Taylor & Co. liquidators said that the main reason for the collapse of Appster was a "sharp drop" in available work during the prior 6 months before the collapse, which led to lost revenue and missed targets.

In 2019, it was reported that the liquidator was rallying creditors to pursue legal action against founders McDonald and Humphrey, alleging they traded while insolvent.

== Awards ==
- 2014 BRW’s 27th Most Innovative Company.
- 2015 Telstra Business Award
