= E3 1995 =

First annual Electronic Entertainment Expo

Electronic Entertainment Expo 1995
- Genre: Video games Interactive entertainment
- Begins: May 11, 1995
- Ends: May 13, 1995
- Venue: Los Angeles Convention Center
- Locations: Los Angeles, California
- Country: United States
- Next event: E3 1996
- Attendance: 50,000
- Organizer: Entertainment Software Association
- Filing status: Non-profit

The Electronic Entertainment Expo 1995, commonly known as E3 1995, was the first Electronic Entertainment Expo held. The event took place at the Los Angeles Convention Center from May 11–13, 1995, with 50,000 total attendees. Highlights of the 1995 show include Sony's announcement of the PlayStation's release date and pricing, Sega's surprise launch of the Sega Saturn, and Nintendo's showcase of the Virtual Boy console.

== Organization ==
Prior to 1995, the video game industry used the Consumer Electronics Show (CES) as their primary trade show venue. In the years leading up to 1995, the video game industry was usually delegated to an outdoor section of CES, which were not ideal conditions for promoting products. The International Digital Software Association (IDSA), later renamed to the Entertainment Software Association (ESA), approached CES and its head Gary J. Shapiro with their grievances about the conditions they had at CES. As CES did not consider video games as part of consumer electronics, they were unwilling to alter how they would involve video games. This led IDSA to consider starting their own show. Pat Ferrell of GamePro, a publication owned by International Data Group (IDG) with experience in running trade shows like MacWorld, began the process of organizing such a show. Tom Kalinske, then the CEO of Sega of America, was a prime motivator in establishing a new show, believing CES did not have the video game industry's best interests at heart, and had found previously that running a Sega-only event was highly regarded by retailers and media alike. IDSA also recognized that by holding its own trade show, it would have a means to finance its organization. Ferrell came up with the show's name "Electronic Entertainment Expo" with the idea that it could be treated as "E cubed", however, the games media found the "E cubed" approach cumbersome and preferred the simpler "E3" moniker.

CES overheard these plans, and quickly proposed their own CES-branded video game-only trade show. IDSA and CES approached the larger video game companies to pitch their versions of the show. Many of the younger companies, like Electronic Arts, desired the approach offered by IDSA, including the potential to own part of the show by becoming members of the IDSA, over what the CES offered. The primary holdout to IDSA's plan was Nintendo, who believed their hardware should be treated as consumer electronics and thus should be part of CES. During these negotiations, the CES reserved space in Philadelphia for the show during the month of May, which Ferrell stated was "prime time" for retailers to prepare for late-year/holiday sales. E3 was originally planned for Las Vegas, but after CES reserved space in Philadelphia for mid-May, IDSA switched to the Los Angeles Convention Center (LACC) for the same dates to force exhibitors to choose. Los Angeles was selected partly because it offered easier travel from Japan compared to Philadelphia. Over the next several weeks, prior to either event having to put down their non-refundable reservation fees, IDSA made an aggressive push to get exhibitors for their show, securing more than 180 vendors. Of the major video game companies, only Nintendo and Microsoft had held out, still undecided about which show to attend. Soon after this push, Shapiro contacted Ferrell and told him he "won"; CES dropped the plans for their Philadelphia event. The same day, Nintendo and Microsoft reached out to Ferrell to discuss exhibition plans at his event.

== Event ==
External videos
- Footage of E3 1995 taken by Anthony Parisi, a retailer representative

At this point, most of the floor space at the LACC was taken up by the early exhibitors. Nintendo had desired space in the larger South Hall, but the early adopters like Sony and Sega had already claimed it. Ferrell made sure that Nintendo still had prime floor space in the West Hall, moving the registration areas to the West Hall so that attendees had to pass Nintendo's booth. Ferrell also had to book extra floor space at a dozen different hotels near the convention center due to demand.

Among elements of the first E3 that would continue into future events were large press conferences by the major companies Sony, Sega, and Nintendo showcasing their up-and-coming hardware and software. Notably, at point, both Sega and Sony were ready to introduce new hardware for Western releases, the Sega Saturn and the PlayStation, respectively. Sega's conference was first, and while Kalinske announced that the Saturn would be immediately available in stores, they were notified soon after that supplies were more limited than thought. During Sony's presentation, after covering many of the PlayStation's games, Steve Race, the lead for bringing the PlayStation to the United States, came on stage, said "two-ninety-nine" and then left, revealing that the price of the PlayStation was US$100 less than that of the Saturn. The moment is considered one of the first proverbial mic drop moments in E3's history, and would continue a trend as each company would try to outdo others at these press events.

While official attendance numbers were at 55,000, Ferrell estimated that an additional 10,000 people were able to get in; the event was meant to be limited to professionals in the industry, retailers, and press, but believes that many got in with showing a seemingly-relevant business card.

== Exhibitions ==
=== Nintendo ===
The Virtual Boy, Nintendo's intermediary console released between the Super Nintendo Entertainment System and the Nintendo 64, was showcased prominently. The Nintendo 64, then known as the Ultra 64, was presented in a near-final state of development. Games on display included Donkey Kong Country 2: Diddy's Kong Quest, EarthBound, and Killer Instinct.

=== Sega ===
Prior to E3 1995, the Sega Saturn had already released in Japan, and was slated for a September 2, 1995, American release. On the first day of E3 1995, Sega CEO Tom Kalinske gave a keynote presentation in which he revealed the Saturn's release price of US$399, and described the features of the console. Kalinske also revealed that, due to "high consumer demand", Sega had already shipped 30,000 Saturns to Toys "R" Us, Babbage's, Electronics Boutique, and Software Etc. for immediate release.

=== Sony ===
Sony announced the price and release date for the then-upcoming PlayStation. Prior to Sony's keynote conference, Sega announced the US$399 retail price for the newly-released Sega Saturn; capitalizing on the opportunity, SCEA President Steve Race made a single, brief statement at Sony's conference: "$299". The audience cheered as Race walked away from the lectern.

== List of notable exhibitors ==
This is a list of major video game exhibitors who made appearances at E3 1995:

The 3DO Company; Acclaim Entertainment; Activision; Atari Corporation; Capcom	Crystal Dynamics; Electronic Arts; LucasArts; Microsoft; Namco	Nintendo; Sega; Sony Computer Entertainment; SNK; Williams Electronics

== List of featured games ==
This is a list of notable titles that appeared by their developers or publishers at E3 1995:

The 3DO Company: BattleSport (3DO); Captain Quazar (3DO); Killing Time (3DO); Primal Rage (3DO); Acclaim Entertainment: Batman Forever (Genesis, SNES); Cutthroat Island (Genesis, SNES); D (3DO); Foreman For Real (Genesis, SNES); Frank Thomas Big Hurt Baseball (Genesis, SNES); Judge Dredd (Genesis, SNES); Justice League Task Force (Genesis, SNES); Myst (Saturn); NFL Quarterback Club 96 (Genesis, Saturn, SNES); Revolution X (Genesis, Saturn, SNES); Robotica (Saturn); Stargate (Genesis, SNES); Turok: Dinosaur Hunter (N64); True Lies (Genesis, SNES); Venom/Spider-Man: Separation Anxiety (Genesis, SNES); Warlock (Genesis, SNES); WWF Raw (32X, Genesis, SNES); Activision: MechWarrior 3050 (SNES); Pitfall: The Mayan Adventure (32X); Atari Corporation: Battlemorph (Jaguar CD); BattleSphere (Jaguar); Blue Lightning (Jaguar CD); Brett Hull NHL Hockey (Jaguar, Jaguar CD); Caves of Fear (Jaguar CD); Creature Shock (Jaguar CD); Deathwatch (Jaguar); Defender 2000 (Jaguar); Fight for Life (Jaguar); FlipOut! (Jaguar); Highlander: The Last of the MacLeods (Jaguar CD); Hyper Force (Jaguar); Missile Command 3D (Jaguar); Phase Zero (Jaguar); Primal Rage (Jaguar CD); Power Drive Rally (Jaguar); Rayman (Jaguar, PS1, Saturn); Ruiner Pinball (Jaguar); Soulstar (Jaguar CD); Super Burnout (Jaguar); Thea Realm Fighters (Jaguar); Ultra Vortek (Jaguar); Vid Grid (Jaguar CD); Virtual Light Machine (Jaguar CD); White Men Can't Jump (Jaguar)	Capcom: Breath of Fire II (SNES); Darkstalkers: The Night Warriors (PS1); Mega Man X3 (SNES); Night Warriors: Darkstalkers' Revenge (Arcade, Saturn); Resident Evil (PS1); Street Fighter: The Movie (PlayStation, Saturn); X-Men: Children of the Atom (Arcade, Saturn); Crystal Dynamics: 3D Baseball (PS1, Saturn); Blazing Dragons (PS1, Saturn); Blood Omen: Legacy of Kain (PS1); Gex (PS1, Saturn); The Horde (Saturn); Off-World Interceptor (PS1, Saturn); Solar Eclipse (PS1, Saturn); Cyberdreams: Dark Seed II (PC); I Have No Mouth, and I Must Scream (PC); Electronic Arts: FIFA Soccer 96 (PS1, Saturn); Foes of Ali (3DO); PGA Tour 96 (PS1, Saturn); Psychic Detective (3DO, PC, PS1); Shockwave Assault (PS1); Viewpoint (PS1); Wing Commander III: Heart of the Tiger (3DO, PS1); Interplay Entertainment: Cyberia (PC, Saturn); Descent (PC); Nintendo: Donkey Kong Country 2: Diddy's Kong Quest (SNES); Donkey Kong Land (Game Boy); EarthBound (SNES); Killer Instinct (SNES); Street Fighter II: The World Warrior (Game Boy)	Sega: The Adventures of Batman & Robin (Genesis, Sega CD); Clockwork Knight (Saturn); Comix Zone (Genesis); Daytona USA (Saturn); Ecco Jr. (Genesis); Garfield: Caught in the Act (Genesis); Nightmare Circus (Genesis); Panzer Dragoon (Saturn); Vectorman (Genesis); Virtua Cop (Arcade); Virtua Fighter (Arcade, Saturn); Sony Computer Entertainment: Battle Arena Toshinden (PS1); Ridge Racer (PS1); Twisted Metal (PS1); Warhawk (PS1); SNK: Baseball Stars 2 (Neo Geo CD); Fatal Fury Special (Neo Geo CD); The King of Fighters '94 (Neo Geo CD); Samurai Shodown (Neo Geo CD); Samurai Shodown II (Neo Geo CD); Super Sidekicks 3 (Neo Geo CD); Square: Chrono Trigger (SNES); Secret of Evermore (SNES); Williams Electronics: Doom (SNES); Mortal Kombat 3 (Genesis, PS1)

== Bibliography ==
- Kent, Steven L. (2001). The Ultimate History of Video Games: The Story Behind the Craze that Touched our Lives and Changed the World. Roseville, California: Prima Publishing. ISBN 0-7615-3643-4.
