= Atari Jaguar CD =

Peripheral for the Atari Jaguar video game console

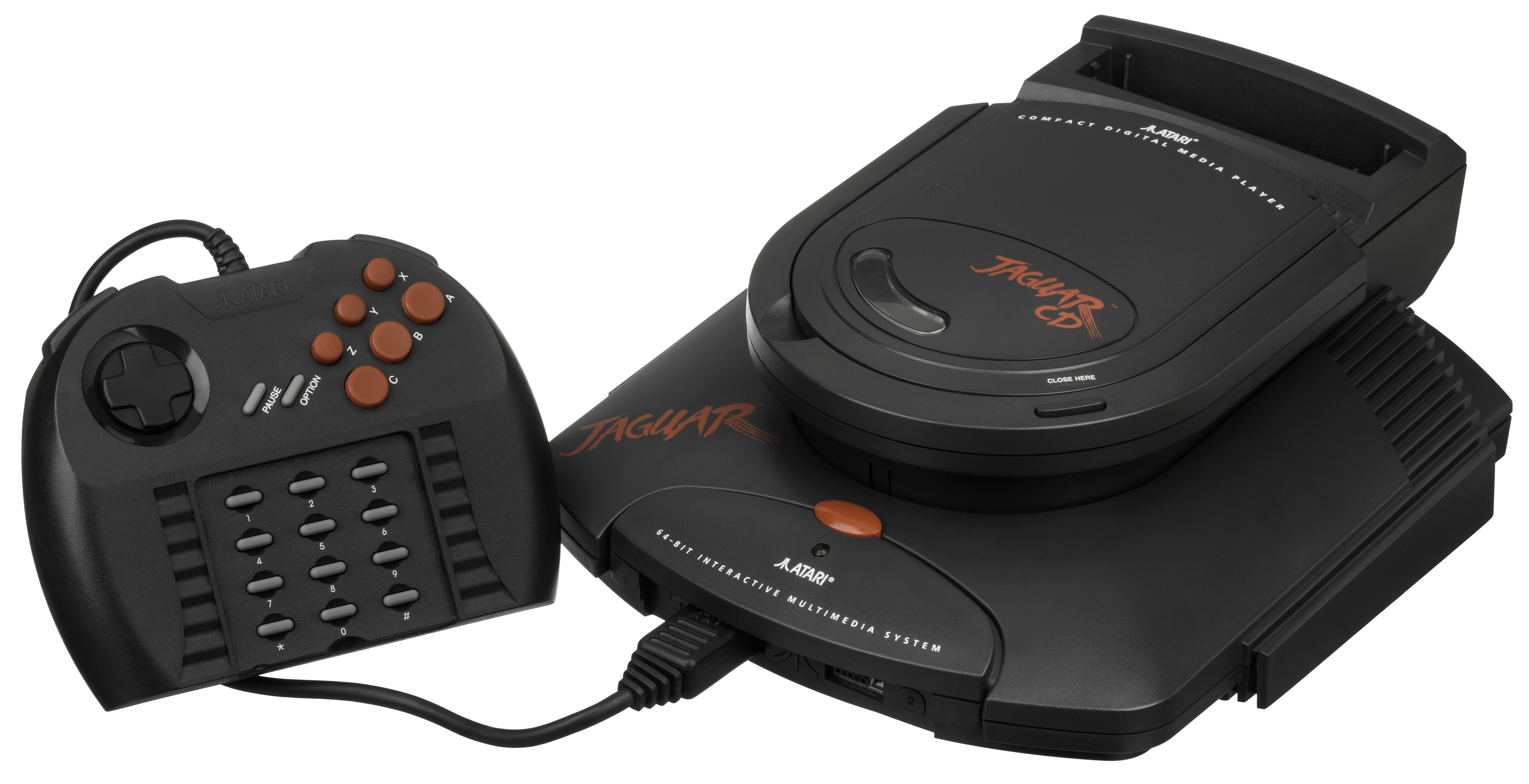
- Jaguar CD atop the console with the ProController
- Manufacturer: Atari Corporation
- Type: Video game console peripheral
- Generation: Fifth
- Released: September 21, 1995
- Introductory price: US$149.95 (equivalent to $320 in 2025)
- Discontinued: 1996
- Media: CD-ROM

The Atari Jaguar CD is a CD-ROM peripheral for the Atari Jaguar video game console. Only 13 games were released for the Jaguar CD. However, previously unfinished and homebrew games have since been released.

== History ==
Atari Corporation announced a CD-ROM drive for the Jaguar before the console's November 1993 launch. Codenamed Jaguar II during development, the Jaguar CD was released on September 21, 1995 for US$149.95 (equivalent to about $320 in 2025). It was originally scheduled for launch during the 1994 holiday shopping season, with multiple delays. In mid-1994, Atari and Sigma Designs signed an agreement to co-develop a PC board that would allow Jaguar CD games to be played on home computers, with a scheduled release by the end of 1994; however, it was never released.

== Technicals ==
The drive fits into the ROM cartridge slot atop the console, with its own pass-through cartridge slot to optionally run software that uses cartridge only or that uses cartridge and CD in tandem. The Memory Track cartridge stores saved game position and high scores. Several publications have criticized the Jaguar CD's design for resembling a toilet.

The Jaguar CD has a double-speed (2×) drive and built-in VLM (Virtual Light Machine) software by Jeff Minter, using a spectrum analyzer for a sophisticated video light show for audio CDs. It is bundled with Blue Lightning, Vid Grid, the Tempest 2000 soundtrack CD, and a Myst demo disc. Every startup screen is unique, using the VLM for a random light show.

Jaguar CDs can store up to 790MB, more than conventional CD-ROMs. Its proprietary CD format is based on the audio CD format, instead of standard CD-ROM data formats. It allows for more storage, and its incompatibility foils casual piracy, at the expense of reduced error correction.

== See also ==
- 64DD
- Famicom Disk System
- Sega CD
- Super NES CD-ROM
- Xbox 360 HD DVD Player
