= We Sing Pop! =

2012 video game

- Developer: Le Cortex
- Publisher: Nordic Games
- Producer: Wired Productions
- Platforms: Wii; Xbox One; PlayStation 4
- Release: EU: 23 March 2012; NA: 14 December 2012
- Genre: Music Video game
- Modes: Single-player, Multiplayer

We Sing Pop! is a 2012 karaoke game part of the We Sing family of games, developed by French studio Le Cortex. The game features songs from the pop genre of music, covering popular songs from decades of music. The game was announced along with We Sing UK Hits and We Sing Rock! at E3 2011.

== Gameplay ==
The gameplay is similar to the SingStar set of video games. Players are required to sing along with music in order to score points, matching pitch and rhythm. The game has anticheat technology whereby tapping or humming will register on the screen but no points will be awarded. We Sing Pop! also contains the addition of 'Star Notes' that allow the player to score even more points by matching the pitch and rhythm of certain hard to score parts of songs.

- 30 full licensed songs with music videos where available
- Solo Modes - Solo, Blind and Expert.
- Multiplayer modes - Group Battle, We Sing, Versus, Pass the Mic, First to X, Expert, Blind, Marathon.
- Real Karaoke mode
- Jukebox mode
- Singing Lessons
- Award System
- Customisable backgrounds
- Four Microphones
- Integrates with a USB hub

Due to hardware limitations with the Wii only having two USB ports, a standard USB hub can be used to play with three or more players. The game uses the standard logitech USB microphone for the Wii.

== Track list ==
Below is the whole list of 30 tracks.

1. Adele - Rolling in the Deep
2. Bruno Mars - Just The Way You Are
3. Coldplay - Clocks
4. Cyndi Lauper - Girls Just Want to Have Fun
5. Enrique Iglesias - Hero
6. Fergie - Big Girls Don't Cry
7. Flo Rida ft. David Guetta – Club Can't Handle Me
8. Florence + The Machine - Dog Days Are Over
9. Hanson - MMMBop
10. Jason Mraz - I'm Yours
11. Jessie J - Nobody's Perfect
12. Kelis - Milkshake
13. The Killers - When You Were Young
14. Lady Gaga - Bad Romance
15. Lady Gaga - Born This Way
16. Nelly Furtado - I'm Like a Bird
17. Nicole Scherzinger - Don't Hold Your Breath
18. Outkast - Hey Ya!
19. Owl City - Fireflies
20. Peter Andre ft. Bubbler Ranx - Mysterious Girl
21. Pussycat Dolls - When I Grow Up
22. Rihanna - Don't Stop the Music
23. Scissor Sisters - I Don't Feel Like Dancin'
24. Sonny & Cher – I Got You Babe
25. Tinie Tempah ft. Eric Turner - Written in the Stars
26. Vanilla Ice - Ice Ice Baby
27. Village People - Y.M.C.A.
28. Wet Wet Wet - Love Is All Around
29. Wham! - I'm Your Man
30. Wretch 32 ft. Example - Unorthodox

== See also ==
- We Sing
- We Sing Encore
- SingStar
- Karaoke Revolution
- Lips
