= We Sing Down Under =

2011 video game

- Developer: Le Cortex
- Publisher: Nordic Games
- Producer: Wired Productions
- Platform: Wii
- Release: AU: March 31, 2011
- Genre: Music Video game
- Modes: Single-player, Multiplayer

We Sing Down Under is a 2011 karaoke game part of the We Sing family of games, developed by French studio Le Cortex. The game features 100% Australian artists and has been released in the Australian territory before Europe.

== Gameplay ==
The gameplay is similar to the SingStar set of video games. Players are required to sing along with music in order to score points, matching pitch and rhythm. The game has anticheat technology whereby tapping or humming will register on the screen but no points will be awarded. We Sing Down Under also contains the addition of 'Star Notes' that allow the player to score even more points by matching the pitch and rhythm of certain hard to score parts of songs.

- 30 full licensed songs with music videos where available
- Solo Mode
- Multiplayer modes - Group Battle, We Sing, Versus, Pass the Mic, First to X, Expert, Blind, Marathon.
- Real Karaoke mode
- Jukebox mode
- Singing Lessons
- Award System
- Customisable backgrounds
- Four Microphones
- Integrates with a USB hub

Due to hardware limitations with the Wii only having two USB ports, a USB hub is shipped with certain retail sku's to add more USB ports. The game uses the standard logitech USB microphone for the Wii.

== Track List ==
Current lists of songs that have been announced via the We Sing Facebook page, press releases and screenshots. The entire track list for We Sing Down Under was announced on March 31 with the launch of the game in Australia.

1. Christine Anu - My Island Home
2. Daddy Cool - Eagle Rock
3. Delta Goodrem - Born to Try
4. Divinyls - I Touch Myself
5. Evermore - Light Surrounding You
6. Faker - This Heart Attack
7. Gabriella Cilmi - Sweet About Me
8. Gina G - (Ooh Ah) Just A Little Bit
9. Guy Sebastian - Like It Like That
10. Jimmy Barnes - No Second Prize
11. John Paul Young - Love Is In The Air
12. Kasey Chambers - Not Pretty Enough
13. Kate Miller-Heidke - The Last Day On Earth
14. Leonardo's Bride - Even When I'm Sleeping
15. Men at Work - Down Under
16. Mental As Anything - Live It Up
17. Natalie Imbruglia - Torn
18. Olivia Newton-John - Physical
19. Rogue Traders - Voodoo Child
20. Rolf Harris - Tie Me Kangaroo Down, Sport
21. Savage Garden - Truly Madly Deeply
22. Slim Dusty - Waltzing Matilda
23. Shannon Noll - What About Me
24. The Choirboys - Run to Paradise
25. The Potbelleez - Don't Hold Back
26. Tina Arena - Chains
27. The Veronicas - Hook Me Up
28. The Vines - Get Free
29. Wendy Matthews - The Day You Went Away
30. The Whitlams - No Aphrodisiac

== Peripherals ==
Due to hardware limitations with the Wii only having two USB ports, a USB hub is shipped with certain retail sku's to add more USB ports. The game uses the standard Logitech USB microphone for the Wii.

== See also ==
- We Sing
- We Sing Encore
- We Sing Robbie Williams
- SingStar
- Karaoke Revolution
- Lips
