= Lego Racers =

1999 video game

- Developer: High Voltage Software (Note: Game Boy Color version developed by Climax Studios)
- Publisher: Lego Media
- Director: Kerry J. Ganofsky
- Producer: Tomas Gillo
- Designer: Kerry J. Ganofsky
- Programmers: Scott Corley; Dwight Luetscher
- Artist: Cary Penczek
- Composer: Eric Nofsinger
- Platforms: Windows; Nintendo 64; PlayStation; Game Boy Color
- Release: August 23, 1999: Windows; NA: August 23, 1999; UK: August 1999; Nintendo 64; NA: October 22, 1999; UK: November 5, 1999; PlayStation; UK: November 26, 1999; NA: December 17, 1999; Game Boy Color; UK: December 29, 2000; NA: January 18, 2001
- Genre: Racing
- Modes: Single-player, multiplayer

Lego Racers is a 1999 Lego-themed kart racing video game developed by High Voltage Software and published by Lego Media for Microsoft Windows, followed by console ports to Nintendo 64 and PlayStation. Set in the fictional "Legoland" universe, the single-player mode follows various minifigure characters competing in a racing competition created by a fictional racing champion called Rocket Racer.

In Lego Racers, players control a minifigure, allowing them to drive a variety of cars built out of Lego and race them against other minifigure characters. Items can be used by the player to hinder other racers' progress, and the player can create their own cars and characters with unlocked Lego bricks and use them to race. A local multiplayer mode also allows multiple players to race against each other.

Originally conceived by High Voltage founder Kerry J. Ganofsky, creative expertise from The Lego Group assisted High Voltage in the game's development after Lego Media agreed to begin production. It received mixed reviews from critics, who were divided on the game's graphics, construction system, driving gameplay and other design aspects, but has gained a degree of cult popularity. Two sequels were later released: Lego Racers 2 and Drome Racers.

== Gameplay ==
Screenshot of a race in Lego Racers, displaying the player controlled racer in the center of the screen as well as the game's HUD; the three colored bricks on the field are power-up items

Lego Racers is a racing game played from a third person perspective. The player takes on the hosts and co-racers in circuits of races in an attempt to reach and beat Rocket Racer and become the "Greatest Lego Racer of All Time", completing the game. The circuits are contested by the player, the host, and four co-racers relevant to the themes of the tracks featured. In the first six circuits, there are a total of 12 unique tracks, four per circuit, and three per one of four themes: Castle, Pirates, Space, and Adventurers. The later three circuits revisit the tracks from the first three in reverse order with each track now mirrored. The final circuit consists of only one track: Rocket Racer Run, but still features four co-racers relevant to the previous tracks' themes.

Players assume the role of either one of several pre-built or custom-built minifigures and compete against other minifigure characters in races set across different tracks in the Legoland universe, using a variety of cars built out of Lego. At the beginning of each race, the player can perform a "Turbo Start", which allows the player to start the race at full speed. Throughout races, the player can also perform power slides and "Super Slides", which allow the player's car to turn around corners more sharply.

Each of the game's tracks contains power up bricks, which can be collected by the player and used to gain an advantage over other racers. The power ups are divided into four categories: Projectile, Hazard, Shield and Turbo, with each providing a different use to the player. The player can also collect up to three "power plus" bricks, which increase the capability of any power ups collected. Most tracks contain at least one shortcut that players can use to get ahead of opponents, which are usually either found with careful looking, or accessed using power-ups, mainly Projectile power-ups that destroy part of the scenery. During a race, the in-game HUD displays the player's position, lap number, "lap timers", and a "Power Up Icon" if the player is carrying any power up or power plus bricks. The player can also choose between viewing the "Speedometer", the "Course Map" or the "Close-up Map".

The game contains three single-player modes: "Circuit Race", "Single Race" and "Time Race", as well as one multiplayer mode, "Versus Race". The Circuit Race mode follows the game's main plot, and allows players to race through circuits made up of multiple tracks, gaining points based on where they place, while contending with the host, a highly-skilled racer who leads each circuit. In a circuit, the player must earn enough points to move on to the next race, and will win if they finish with the most points (even in the event of a tie). Placing third or above in a circuit unlocks the next circuit for the player. Winning the circuit gives the player access to that boss's character parts and car. The Single Race mode allows the player to race on a single track unlocked from the Circuit Race mode. The Time Race mode places the player in a race against Veronica Voltage driving a ghost car with the aim of beating her best time around a track chosen by the player. If the player beats Veronica's time on all tracks, they unlock her car and her character parts. Versus Race allows two players to race against each other in a split screen view without non-player character minifigures on the track.

=== Build mode ===
Throughout the game, the player can unlock various brick sets and character pieces by completing certain tasks, such as coming first in a Circuit Race. The game's "Build Menu" allows the player to build custom cars, minifigures and driving licenses of their own design using unlocked bricks and character parts. Minifigures can be customized with different hat, hair, head, body and leg parts, and given a name entered by the player on the minifigure's driving license. A picture of the player's minifigure is also placed on their driving license, and their facial expression can be changed by the player. The player can create a custom car using a combination of different chassis and car sets. The player can rotate, move and place bricks from these sets directly on to the chassis. Placement of the bricks changes the car's balance and weight, which affects its overall performance. The "Mix" option creates minifigures from randomly selected parts, while the "Quick Build" option creates one of 2 presets for a specific chassis.

== Plot and characters ==
Set in the fictional Legoland universe, the game depicts Rocket Racer, the "greatest racing champion" in Legoland. After becoming bored from beating everyone at racing, he decides to create a racing contest, and finds the best racers in the history of Legoland using a dimensional warp machine created by his friend, Veronica Voltage, a genius scientist and mechanic.

There is a total of 24 rival racers in Lego Racers. The main characters are:

- Captain Redbeard (Pirates), host of circuit one
- King Kahuka (Islanders), host of circuit two
- Basil the Batlord (Fright Knights), host of circuit three
- Johnny Thunder (Adventurers), host of circuit four
- Baron Von Barron (Adventurers), host of circuit five
- Gypsy Moth (Insectoids), host of circuit six
- Rocket Racer, the "champion" and host of circuit seven
- Veronica Voltage, time trial rival

== Development ==
The concept for Lego Racers was initially created by High Voltage Software founder Kerry J. Ganofsky, with the idea of players being able to build and race cars created with Lego bricks. After a year of development, Lego Media began production of the game, hiring Ganofsky's company to develop it. Lego Media and other facilities within The Lego Group collaborated with High Voltage Software during the production of the game. Lego Racers was revealed at the ECTS show in September 1998 along with early footage.

A large number of character models, documents and pictures from different Lego System characters and models were sent to the developers, who eventually chose to use the Castle, Space, Adventurers and Pirates themes in the game. High Voltage Software chose the characters they liked best from these themes and created character studies for them to "capture the mood of each persona". Certain characters would assume the role of bosses, while others were featured as less skilled opponents. The developers also created two original characters, Rocket Racer and Veronica Voltage.

High Voltage Software spent over a year creating Lego Racers' car building mechanics. The game's lead programmer, Dwight Luetscher, created a formula that was used by the game's artists to create individual Lego elements in the game. The pieces available to the player were selected from hundreds of Lego elements by the developers, chosen first by aesthetics, and then analysed to see if they would fit into Luetscher's formula. The developers chose to affect the attributes of the player's car, such as handling, acceleration and top speed, through how many bricks are placed on the chassis, as this is simpler to understand for the game's main age demographic.

Due to the high number of Lego sets and pieces in the game, a custom mesh code was created to "weld" the geometry in place and optimize the cars polygon count, creating one solid mesh for each car created by the player. Every element in the game, including bricks and character pieces, had different levels of detail created for use in menu screens and cut scenes, where the models had to be a higher quality due to the player seeing them up close. The developers planned a damage system where bricks would break apart from the car upon crashing, but this presented "too many problems to make it a real possibility" and such feature later ended up in the sequel. Lego Racers was available to play before release by journalists at E3 1999.

== Reception ==
Reception

Aggregate score
Aggregator	Score		
Aggregator	N64	PC	PS
GameRankings	66%	75%	63%

Review scores
Publication	Score		
Publication	N64	PC	PS
AllGame	2/5	2/5	3.5/5
CNET Gamecenter	7/10	N/A	N/A
Computer Games Strategy Plus	N/A	4/5	N/A
Electronic Gaming Monthly	6.25/10 (Note: Four critics of Electronic Gaming Monthly gave the Nintendo 64 version each a score of 6.5/10, 7/10, 4/10, and 7.5/10.)	N/A	N/A
Game Informer	7.75/10	N/A	N/A
GameFan	91%	88%	N/A
GamePro	2.5/5 (Note: GamePro gave the Nintendo 64 version 3/5 for graphics, 2/5 for sound, 4/5 for control, and 2.5/5 for overall fun factor.)	N/A	N/A
GameSpot	4.6/10	7/10	N/A
IGN	7.5/10	6.1/10	6/10
N64 Magazine	70%	N/A	N/A
Next Generation	2/5	N/A	N/A
Nintendo Power	7/10	N/A	N/A
PlayStation Official Magazine – UK	N/A	N/A	5/10

The PC version of Lego Racers received favorable reviews, while the Nintendo 64 and PlayStation versions received mixed or average reviews, according to the review aggregation website GameRankings. Nintendo Power gave the N64 version an above-average review, a few months before it was released Stateside.

The game's graphics were generally praised by critics. GameSpot's Andrew Seyoon Park stated that virtually everything in the PC version "looks bright, colorful and clean" when playing in 3D-accelerated mode, but called its texturing minimal. Ben Stahl of the same website also called the N64 version's track design "innovative and cute", as well as saying the tracks and backgrounds have a "somewhat real look" that makes it easier to tell where the player should be driving. Trent C. Ward of IGN praised the PC version's background animations, stating that they not only "add to the atmosphere of the game, but also affect the way it plays". However, some reviewers criticised the game's performance, with the website's Sam Bishop stating that the PlayStation version's load times between levels are horrendous and NextGen's Chris Charla calling the N64 version's framerate "nauseatingly slow". Conversely, Winnie Imperio of IGN called the same console version's framerate "consistent, if not entirely smooth".

Lego Racers' gameplay received a mixed reaction from critics. Charla called creating and testing cars a lot of fun, especially because the way a car is built has "a major effect on how it controls", and Ward found that unlocking new bricks in the circuit mode for use in car customization is addictive. However, Stahl called the game's construction system unfriendly, stating that the player is "better off just sticking with one of the default vehicles". Imperio said that handling the cars is "surprisingly tight", calling the N64 control scheme intuitive. Conversely, Charla found that most of the cars feel top-heavy, and stated that the racing is awful. Ward praised the power up system, calling it pretty cool, as well as stating that the Power Plus bricks add "a new strategy to the game", but Stahl called the system "terribly lame". Reviewers also criticised the game's multiplayer features, with Ward calling the split screen mode simple, and Crispin Boyer of Electronic Gaming Monthly stating that the "lack of multiplayer options" hurts Lego Racers' replay value.

Other aspects of Lego Racers' design also received mixed opinions from critics. EGM's Dean Hager called the game's race tracks "short, unimaginative and devoid of good shortcuts." Imperio called the track design "simplistic and often not very difficult", but "still well designed and a lot of fun to race through". Park called the game's music cheery and upbeat, while Stahl called it "barely acceptable", stating that it "gets irritating rather quickly", as well as calling the game's sound effects "decidedly poor". Bishop said that the sound effects "lack crispness", citing their low sample rate as a reason, as well as calling the game's music "flat".

The game was a finalist for the Academy of Interactive Arts & Sciences' "Console Children's/Family Title of the Year" and "PC Children's Entertainment Title of the Year" at the 3rd Annual Interactive Achievement Awards, both of which went to Pokémon Snap and Disney's Villains' Revenge, respectively.

== Legacy ==
Lego Racers was a success and has remained a popular title among fans for elements such as its "quirky sense of humor", gaining a cult popularity since its release. In retrospect, VG247's Alex Donaldson called it a "delight". Harry Alexander, writing for CBR, wrote in an article that "The original LEGO Racers was no masterpiece even in its day. [..] What the game did have, however, was a characteristic so often lacking in many releases in the present AAA era: charm. From the endearing musical themes to the cast of goofy and eccentric characters".

In 2021, Eric Nofsinger, executive at High Voltage, said "It's been over 20 years since we shipped it and, to this day, both Kerry Ganofsky and myself receive regular – I would say at least multiple times a week – emails from fans saying how much this game impacted their childhood."

=== Sequel ===
Following Lego Racers' success, news arose in April 2001 that Pocket Studios was working on a sequel to the Game Boy Color version of Lego Racers, titled Lego Racers 2, which was then shown at E3 2001 in May that year. The eponymous Microsoft Windows and PlayStation 2 counterpart to Lego Racers 2, developed by Attention to Detail, was announced in August 2001, and released in September 2001. The sequel followed up immediately after Rocket Racer's defeat in Lego Racers, who is shown a new opportunity to reclaim his title as world champion, by travelling to Xalax and prove himself worthy of it. After Rocket Racer proceeds to do so and succeeds, the player is tasked to control their self-built protagonist, racing through various worlds based on Lego themes, and eventually face Rocket Racer again. Lego Racers 2 was received less favorably than Lego Racers, and incorporated numerous elements from both Lego Racers and Rollcage, another game developed by Attention to Detail.

An arcade-style version of Lego Racers was shown in Legoland Windsor's Lego Rocket Racers building in "The Beginning" area, between 2000 and 2004, as well as 2009 and 2011.

Over two decades later, in the ninth generation of video game consoles, 2K Games announced a new Lego open world driving game titled Lego 2K Drive.

== Bibliography ==
- LEGO Racers Instruction Booklet (PDF) (instruction manual). Enfield, Connecticut: Lego Media. 1999.
