= We Sing Deutsche Hits =

2011 video game

- Developer: Le Cortex
- Publisher: Nordic Games
- Producer: Wired Productions
- Platform: Wii
- Release: EU: May 26, 2011
- Genre: Music Video game
- Modes: Single-player, multiplayer

We Sing Deutsche Hits is a 2011 karaoke game part of the We Sing family of games, developed by French studio Le Cortex. The game features exclusively German artists and was only released in German-speaking territories.

== Gameplay ==
The gameplay is similar to the SingStar set of video games. Players are required to sing along with music in order to score points, matching pitch and rhythm. The game has anticheat technology whereby tapping or humming will register on the screen but no points will be awarded. We Sing Deutsche Hits also contains the addition of 'Star Notes' that allows the player to score even more points by matching the pitch and rhythm of certain hard to score parts of songs.

- 40 full licensed songs with music videos where available
- Solo Mode
- Multiplayer modes - Group Battle, We Sing, Versus, Pass the Mic, First to X, Expert, Blind and Marathon
- Real Karaoke mode
- Jukebox mode
- Singing Lessons
- Award System
- Customisable backgrounds
- Four Microphones
- Integrates with a USB hub

== Track listing ==
The complete track list for We Sing Deutsche Hits was announced on the Flashpoint website, the German distributor for the game.

1. 2Raumwohnung - Besser Geht's Nicht
2. Christina Stürmer - Fieber
3. Costa Cordalis - Anita
4. Culcha Candela - Hamma!
5. Deichkind - Remmidemmi
6. Die Atzen - Disco Pogo
7. Die Fantastischen Vier - Gebt Uns Ruhig Die Schuld
8. Die Toten Hosen - Strom
9. DJ Ötzi & Nik P. - Ein Stern (...der deinen Namen trägt)
10. Extrabreit - Flieger Grüss Mir Die Sonne
11. Fettes Brot - Jein
12. Geier Sturzflug - Pure Lust Am Leben
13. Hans Albers - Auf Der Reeperbahn Nachts Um Halb Eins
14. Heinz Rühmann - Ein Freund, Ein Guter Freund
15. Hildegard Knef - Für Mich Soll's Rote Rosen Regnen
16. Howard Carpendale - Hello Again
17. Hubert Kah - Sternenhimmel
18. Ich + Ich - Vom Selben Stern
19. Jan Delay - Feuer
20. Juli - Geile Zeit
21. Kettcar - Landungsbrücken Raus
22. LaFee - Heul Doch
23. Marianne Rosenberg - Er Gehört Zu Mir
24. Max Raabe & Palast Orchester - Kein Schwein Ruft Mich An
25. Mia - Tanz Der Moleküle
26. Münchner Freiheit - Ohne Dich
27. Nena - Nur Geträumt
28. Polarkreis 18 - Allein Allein
29. Revolverheld - Freunde Bleiben
30. Rio Reiser - König Von Deutschland
31. Rosenstolz - Liebe Ist Alles
32. Sido - Hey Du!
33. Söhne Mannheims - Und Wenn Ein Lied
34. Sportfreunde Stiller - Ein Kompliment
35. Udo Lindenberg - Sonderzug Nach Pankow
36. Udo Lindenberg & Jan Delay - Ganz Anders
37. Unheilig - Geboren Um Zu Leben
38. Wir Sind Helden - Aurélie
39. Wolfgang Petry - Wahnsinn
40. Xavier Naidoo - Dieser Weg

== Peripherals ==
Due to hardware limitations with the Wii only having two USB ports, a USB hub is shipped with certain retail sku's to add more USB ports. The game uses the standard Logitech USB microphone for the Wii.

== See also ==
- We Sing
- We Sing Encore
- We Sing Robbie Williams
- SingStar
- Karaoke Revolution
- Lips
