= We Sing 80s =

2012 video game

- Developer: Le Cortex
- Publisher: Nordic Games
- Producer: Wired Productions
- Platform: Wii
- Release: EU: 28 September 2012; NA: 8 February 2013
- Genre: Music
- Modes: Single-player, multiplayer

We Sing 80s is a 2012 karaoke game part of the We Sing family of games, developed by French studio Le Cortex. The game features songs from the 1980s only.

== Gameplay ==
The gameplay is similar to the SingStar set of video games. Players are required to sing along with music in order to score points, matching pitch and rhythm. The game has anticheat technology whereby tapping or humming will register on the screen but no points will be awarded. We Sing Pop! also contains the addition of 'Star Notes' that allow the player to score even more points by matching the pitch and rhythm of certain hard to score parts of songs.

- 30 full licensed songs with music videos where available
- Solo Modes - Solo, Blind and Expert.
- Multiplayer modes - Group Battle, We Sing, Versus, Pass the Mic, First to X, Expert, Blind, Marathon.
- Real Karaoke mode
- Jukebox mode
- Singing Lessons
- Award System
- Customisable backgrounds
- Four Microphones
- Integrates with a USB hub

Due to hardware limitations with the Wii only having two USB ports, a standard USB hub can be used to play with three or more players. The game uses the standard logitech USB microphone for the Wii.

== Track list ==
The tracklist for We Sing 80s was announced over a set number of weeks. The final full tracklist for the international version of the game was announced on 18 September 2012

1. Baltimora - Tarzan Boy
2. The Bangles - Eternal Flame
3. Blondie - The Tide is High
4. Cameo - Word Up!
5. Culture Club - Do You Really Want To Hurt Me
6. Cyndi Lauper - True Colors
7. DeBarge - Rhythm of the Night
8. Dexys Midnight Runners - Come On Eileen
9. Duran Duran - Rio
10. Frankie Goes to Hollywood - The Power of Love
11. The Human League - Don't You Want Me
12. Kylie Minogue - I Should Be So Lucky
13. Lionel Richie - All Night Long (All Night)
14. Lisa Stansfield - All Around The World
15. Musical Youth - Pass the Dutchie
16. Paula Abdul - Straight Up
17. Queen - I Want to Break Free
18. Roxette - The Look
19. Sabrina - Boys (Summertime Love)
20. Sade - Smooth Operator
21. Simple Minds - Alive & Kicking
22. Smokey Robinson - Being with You
23. Spandau Ballet - True
24. Starship - Nothing's Gonna Stop Us Now
25. Tears for Fears - Shout
26. Tiffany - I Think We're Alone Now
27. Toto - Africa
28. T'Pau - China in Your Hand
29. Yazoo - Only You
30. Yazz and the Plastic Population - The Only Way Is Up

== Peripherals ==
Due to hardware limitations with the Wii only having two USB ports, any standard USB hub can be used to increase the number of USB ports to allow for four players. The game uses the standard Logitech USB microphone for the Wii.

== See also ==
- We Sing
- We Sing Encore
- SingStar
- Karaoke Revolution
- Lips
