= We Sing UK Hits =

2011 video game

- Developer: Le Cortex
- Publisher: Nordic Games Publishing
- Producer: Wired Productions
- Platform: Wii
- Release: EU: September 30, 2011; NA: April 19, 2013
- Genre: Music Video game
- Modes: Single-player, multiplayer

We Sing UK Hits is a 2011 karaoke game part of the We Sing series of games, developed by French studio Le Cortex. The game features 100% United Kingdom artists, with the only exception being that of Lil Wayne, because he is an American.

== Gameplay ==
The gameplay is similar to the SingStar set of video games. Players are required to sing along with music in order to score points, matching pitch and rhythm. The game has anti cheat technology whereby tapping or humming will register on the screen but no points will be awarded. We Sing UK Hits also contains the addition of 'Star Notes' that allow the player to score even more points by matching the pitch and rhythm of certain hard to score parts of songs.

- 40 full licensed songs with music videos where available
- Solo Mode
- Multiplayer modes - Group Battle, We Sing, Versus, Pass the Mic, First to X, Expert, Blind, Marathon.
- Real Karaoke mode
- Jukebox mode
- Singing Lessons
- Award System
- Customisable backgrounds
- Four Microphones
- Integrates with a USB hub

Due to hardware limitations with the Wii only having two USB ports, a USB hub is shipped with certain retail versions to add more USB ports. The game uses the standard logitech USB microphone for the Wii.

== Track List ==
1. Adele - Chasing Pavements
2. Amy Winehouse - Rehab
3. The Animals - The House of the Rising Sun
4. Bananarama - Venus
5. The Beautiful South - A Little Time
6. Blur - Girls & Boys
7. Bucks Fizz - Making Your Mind Up
8. Coldplay - Speed of Sound
9. David Bowie - Let's Dance
10. Dido - White Flag
11. Dusty Springfield - Son Of A Preacher Man
12. East 17 - Stay Another Day
13. Eliza Doolittle - Pack Up
14. Elton John - Candle In The Wind
15. Example - Kickstarts
16. Florence + the Machine - You've Got The Love
17. Gabrielle - Dreams
18. Happy Mondays - Step On
19. James Blunt - You're Beautiful
20. Jay Sean feat. Lil Wayne - Down
21. Jessie J - Do It Like A Dude
22. Kim Wilde - Kids in America
23. Leona Lewis - Bleeding Love
24. Lulu & The Luvvers - Shout
25. Madness - It Must Be Love
26. McFly - 5 Colours In Her Hair
27. Plan B - She Said
28. Pulp - Common People
29. Queen - Don't Stop Me Now
30. Queen & David Bowie - Under Pressure
31. Radiohead - Creep
32. Rick Astley - Never Gonna Give You Up
33. The Saturdays - Missing You
34. Spice Girls - Who Do You Think You Are
35. Sugababes - Push The Button
36. Texas - I Don't Want A Lover
37. Tinchy Stryder Ft. N-Dubz - Number 1
38. The Ting Tings - That's Not My Name
39. Tinie Tempah - Pass Out
40. Wham! - Wake Me Up Before You Go-Go

== Peripherals ==
Due to hardware limitations with the Wii only having two USB ports, a USB hub is shipped with certain retail sku's to add more USB ports. The game uses the standard Logitech USB microphone for the Wii.

== See also ==
- We Sing
- We Sing Encore
- We Sing Robbie Williams
- SingStar
- Karaoke Revolution
- Lips
