= Rollcage Stage II =

2000 video game

- Developer: Attention to Detail
- Publishers: EU: Sony Computer Entertainment; NA: Midway Games; WW: Take-Two Interactive (PC)
- Platforms: PlayStation, Windows
- Release: UK: 10 March 2000 (PS); UK: 17 March 2000 (PC); NA: 16 October 2000
- Genre: Racing
- Modes: Single-player, multiplayer

Rollcage Stage II, also released as Death Track Racing, is a 2000 racing video game developed by Attention to Detail and published by Sony Computer Entertainment for the PlayStation and Microsoft Windows. It is the sequel to Rollcage; unlike its predecessor, Psygnosis did not publish the game anywhere, In addition to basic racing, the game also utilizes combat elements. The game's playable vehicles are equipped with weapons, which are collected along the track as bonus items and can be used against competing cars. The vehicles themselves have wheels that are larger than their bodies, allowing them to still be rendered drivable while flipped upside down.

== Development ==
The game was originally intended to be released in the U.S. in early March 2000, but was delayed by over seven months.

For the North American Windows release, game publisher Take-Two Interactive repackaged the original European/Australasian version as Death Track Racing.

=== Graphical capabilities ===
Rollcage Stage II was also among the first titles to feature hardware-accelerated bump mapping upon its release in March 2000, in the form of EMBM (Environment Mapped Bump Mapping). RSII was designed to be best experienced at the time on Matrox Millennium G400 graphics cards, released in mid-1999, which had exclusive support for EMBM until the ATI Radeon was released in late 2000. Matrox's bump mapping technology was much hyped by industry press outlets at the time, with Matrox demoing Rollcage Stage II as a cutting-edge showcase for their cards, as well as dedicating a page on their website to the game.

== Soundtrack ==
The game featured a licensed soundtrack that included various electronic music artists. An official soundtrack album was released on CD and vinyl by Moving Shadow in March 2000.

== Reception ==
Reception

Aggregate score
Aggregator	Score	
Aggregator	PC	PS
Metacritic	73/100	85/100

Review scores
Publication	Score	
Publication	PC	PS
AllGame	3.5/5	N/A
CNET Gamecenter	6/10	8/10
Computer Games Strategy Plus	3.5/5	N/A
Edge	N/A	8/10
Electronic Gaming Monthly	N/A	8/10
EP Daily	N/A	7.5/10
Eurogamer	9/10	N/A
Game Informer	N/A	7.25/10
GameFan	N/A	(EU) 79% (Note: In GameFan's early viewpoint of the European PlayStation version, three critics gave it each a score of 82, 84, and 72.) (F.M.) 78% (US) 73% (Note: In GameFan's viewpoint of the U.S. PlayStation version, three critics gave it each a score of 71, 73, and 74.)
GameSpot	7/10	7.2/10
GameZone	7/10	N/A
IGN	8.7/10	8.7/10
Next Generation	N/A	4/5
Official U.S. PlayStation Magazine	N/A	3.5/5

Rollcage Stage II received "favourable" reviews, while Death Track Racing received "average" reviews, according to the review aggregation website Metacritic. Daniel Erickson of NextGen said of the former's European version, just over six months before its U.S. release date, "A wonderful surprise, Rollcage Stage II is everything Wipeout 3 should've been but wasn't." Electronic Gaming Monthly, The Electric Playground, Official U.S. PlayStation Magazine, and Game Informer also gave the same European version average to positive reviews, also over six or seven months before its U.S. release date. GamePro said of the European PlayStation import while it was still in development, "Be warned: This game is tough to tame, even if you have the steady hand/eye coordination of an expert racer. Nevertheless, no other PlayStation racer can deliver the stomach-churning chaos of Rollcage Stage II. If your constitution and nerves can stand it, it's an enjoyably wild ride." (Note: GamePro gave the European PlayStation import 4.5/5 for graphics, 3.5/5 for sound, and two 4/5 scores for control and fun factor in an early review.) GameSpot praised the game's sound effects and variety in gameplay modes, and said the game's graphics and physics were an improvement over its predecessor. However, they criticized the game's soundtrack.

== Spiritual successors ==
While Attention to Detail (ATD) and Psygnosis did not continue on the Rollcage series after Rollcage Stage II, ATD later developed the game Firebugs featuring roughly the same racing concept.

After the end of support by the developers and publishers, a former ATD developer who previously worked on the Rollcage games, Robert Baker, released in 2014 updated builds of the games' Windows versions. These builds, based on the original source code, fix longstanding bugs and update both games for use on modern operating systems: Rollcage Redux for Rollcage and Rollcage Extreme for Rollcage Stage II.

In 2015, Robert Baker approached former ATD and Rollcage teammate David Perryman to form Caged Element under the impulsion of entrepreneur Chris Mallinson. Caged Element launched a Kickstarter campaign for Grip, a spiritual successor for the Rollcage series. A prototype was completed before the Kickstarter crowdfunding campaign using Unreal Engine 4. The development staff has two people who worked on the Rollcage series and the soundtrack has artists Technical Itch and Dom & Roland who were on the soundtrack for Rollcage Stage II. However, the campaign was canceled after some time. Grip: Combat Racing was released in November 2018 for Microsoft Windows, PlayStation 4, Xbox One and Nintendo Switch.
