= We Sing Rock! =

2011 video game

- Developer: Le Cortex
- Publisher: Nordic Games Publishing
- Producer: Wired Productions
- Platform: Wii
- Release: EU: November 11, 2011
- Genre: Music Video game
- Modes: Single-player, multiplayer

We Sing Rock! is a 2011 karaoke game part of the We Sing family of games, developed by French studio Le Cortex. The game features songs from the rock genre of music.

== Gameplay ==
The gameplay is similar to the SingStar set of video games. Players are required to sing along with music in order to score points, matching pitch and rhythm. The game has anticheat technology whereby tapping or humming will register on the screen but no points will be awarded. We Sing Rock! also contains the addition of 'Star Notes' that allow the player to score even more points by matching the pitch and rhythm of certain hard to score parts of songs.

- 40 full licensed songs with music videos where available
- Solo Mode
- Multiplayer modes – Group Battle, We Sing, Versus, Pass the Mic, First to X, Expert, Blind, Marathon.
- Real Karaoke mode
- Jukebox mode
- Singing Lessons
- Award System
- Customisable backgrounds
- Four Microphones
- Integrates with a USB hub

Due to hardware limitations with the Wii only having two USB ports, a USB hub is shipped with certain retail versions to add more USB ports. The game uses the standard logitech USB microphone for the Wii.

== Track list ==
The track list for We Sing Rock! was announced on September 26.

1. Thirty Seconds to Mars – Kings and Queens
2. 4 Non Blondes – What's Up
3. Alice Cooper – Poison
4. Bloc Party – The Prayer
5. The Cardigans – My Favourite Game
6. Coldplay – Violet Hill
7. Creedence Clearwater Revival – Proud Mary
8. The Darkness – I Believe in a Thing Called Love
9. Daughtry – What About Now
10. Def Leppard – Pour Some Sugar On Me 1987
11. Elvis Presley – Suspicious Minds
12. Europe – The Final Countdown
13. Evanescence – Bring Me to Life
14. Extreme – More Than Words
15. Faith No More – Epic
16. Franz Ferdinand – Take Me Out
17. Free – All Right Now
18. Garbage – I Think I'm Paranoid
19. Gossip – Standing in the Way of Control
20. Heart – Alone
21. INXS – Never Tear Us Apart
22. Kasabian – Underdog
23. KT Tunstall – Suddenly I See
24. Limp Bizkit – Rollin'
25. Meredith Brooks – Bitch
26. Motörhead – Ace Of Spades
27. My Chemical Romance – Welcome to the Black Parade
28. The Offspring – Pretty Fly (For A White Guy)
29. OK Go – Here It Goes Again 2006
30. Panic! at the Disco – Nine in the Afternoon
31. Paramore – Ignorance
32. The Pretenders – Brass in Pocket
33. Robert Palmer – Addicted to Love
34. Scorpions – Wind of Change
35. Sheryl Crow – All I Wanna Do
36. Simple Minds – Don't You (Forget About Me)
37. Survivor – Eye of the Tiger
38. Tina Turner – The Best
39. Wheatus – Teenage Dirtbag
40. Whitesnake – Here I Go Again '87

== Peripherals ==
Due to hardware limitations with the Wii only having two USB ports, a USB hub is shipped with certain retail sku's to add more USB ports. The game uses the standard Logitech USB microphone for the Wii.

== See also ==
- We Sing
- We Sing Encore
- SingStar
- Karaoke Revolution
- Lips
