= Bulwark Evolution: Falconeer Chronicles =

2024 video game

Bulwark: Falconeer Chronicles
- Developer: Tomas Sala
- Publisher: Wired Productions
- Engine: Unity
- Platforms: PlayStation 4; PlayStation 5; Windows; Xbox One; Xbox Series X/S
- Release: WW: March 26, 2024
- Genre: City-building
- Mode: Single-player

Bulwark Evolution: Falconeer Chronicles (Note: Originally released as Bulwark: Falconeer Chronicles.) is a 2024 city-building game developed by Tomas Sala and published by Wired Productions. It takes place in the same fictional setting as The Falconeer.

== Gameplay ==
Unlike The Falconeer, which was an aerial combat game, Bulwark Evolution: Falconeer Chronicles is a city-building game, though it takes place in the same fictional setting. Players must first gather resources necessary to build city, including wood, stone, and iron. Resources are effectively infinite while being mined, though they have limited distances they can be transported. Once players have established pathways and buildings necessary to extract resources, houses grow automatically. Players can build walls and towers automatically, and these will increase the settlement's military strength, which can be used for defense or to conquer other settlements. Refugees can apply to enter the settlement, and players will occasionally receive offers for unique buildings. While the city grows, players can use an airship to explore the open world.

== Development ==
Wired Productions released it as Bulwark: Falconeer Chronicles for PlayStation 4 and 5, Xbox One and Series X/S, and Windows on March 26, 2024. In September 2024, it was retitled to Bulwark Evolution: Falconeer Chronicles. This accompanies updates that add more content, including a sandbox mode and a conquest mode that disables diplomacy. A third Falconeer game is planned.

== Reception ==
On Metacritic, Bulwark Evolution: Falconeer Chronicles received mixed reviews for Windows and positive reviews for PlayStation 5. Rock Paper Shotgun said that it has a solid base, but they found the lack of goals or instructions to make it feel aimless and exhausting, though they said the combat helped alleviate this somewhat. Eurogamer compared it to Townscaper, a relaxing city-building game. Though they said they would appreciate more structure, they said it would rob the game of some of what makes it unique. PCGamesN called it "beautiful to look at" but criticized what they felt was a lack of depth in its combat and economics.
