= Let's Sing =

Karaoke video game series

- Logo for Let's Sing 2022, similar logo style has been used since Let's Sing 2016
- Genre: Music
- Developer: Voxler SAS
- Publishers: Ravenscourt; Deep Silver; Plaion; THQ Nordic
- Platforms: Xbox 360 (Kinect); Wii; Windows; PlayStation 4 Xbox One; Nintendo Switch; PlayStation 5 Nintendo Switch 2
- First release: Let's Sing; 2012
- Latest release: Let's Sing 2025; 2024

Let's Sing is a music video game series developed by Voxler and originaly published by Deep Silver. In 2020, Koch Media acquired developer Voxler. Starting with Let's Sing 2027, the publisher became THQ Nordic.

== Gameplay ==
Let's Sing is a karaoke game. Music videos play on the screen, while the lyrics appear and light up as the player is singing them. Singing notes at the right pitch scores points. It supports USB microphones and also smartphones can be used as microphones.

== Games ==
Release timeline
2012	Let's Sing (Wii)
2013	Let's Sing and Dance
2013	Let's Sing 2014
2014	Let's Sing (Windows)
2014	Let's Sing 2015
2015	Let's Sing 2016
2016	Let's Sing 2017
2017	Let's Sing 2018
2018	Let's Sing 2019
2019	Let's Sing 2020
2019	Let's Sing Country
2020	Let's Sing Queen
2020	Let's Sing 2021
2021	Let's Sing 2022
2022	Let's Sing ABBA
2022	Let's Sing 2023
2023	Let's Sing 2024
2024	Let's Sing 2025

Aggregate review scores As of 9 March 2023.
Game	Metacritic
Let's Sing Country	62 (Switch)
Let's Sing Queen	77 (PS4); 70 (Switch); 81 (Xbox One)
Let's Sing 2021	68 (PS4)
Let's Sing ABBA	70 (PS5)

Let's Sing
The first game in the series was released on 19 October 2012 for the Wii.
Let's Sing and Dance
The second game in the series was released on 9 October 2013 for the Xbox 360. It differs from the rest of the series since it uses the Kinect motion controller for dancing gameplay. It features songs by Far East Movement, Lady Gaga, LMFAO, and Maroon 5.

Brittany Vincent of Hardcore Gamer gave the game three out of ten and said: "[...] the game itself isn't terrible — it's just derivative and samey. It's an accurate representation of how music gaming is viewed these days. It's a shadow of its former self, with resources poured entirely into the songs that developers think will attract an audience."

Let's Sing 2014
the second game in the series was released on 8 November 2013, for the Wii. It features songs by James Arthur, Carly Rae Jepsen, Village People, and Simple Minds.
Let's Sing Windows
The fourth game in the series was released on 13 February 2014 for Windows. It was published by Plug in Digital. It was originally announced for release on 12 December 2013. It features songs by Lady Gaga, Maroon 5, Lana Del Rey, Flo Rida, Bruno Mars, Avril Lavigne, and LMFAO.
Let's Sing 2015
Announced on 18 September 2014, for release on 24 October 2014, for the Wii. It features songs by Clean Bandit, Avicii, Robin Schultz, Mr. Probz, John Newman, Coldplay, Queen, and Village People.
Let's Sing 2016
Known in Europe as Now That's What I Call Sing. Released on 23 October 2015 in Europe, 10 November 2015 in North America for the PlayStation 3, Xbox 360, Wii, and Windows, developed by Voxler and published by Koch Media. Announced on 9 July 2015. It includes tracks by Jessie J, Ariana Grande, Nicki Minaj, Calvin Harris, and Demi Lovato.

Sam Brooke of Push Square gave the game seven out of ten and summarized: "NOW That's What I Call Sing is a solid buy for anyone in need of a karaoke game on the PS4. Its wide variety of modes make it a hugely entertaining release to play with friends or by yourself, and the vast range of songs ensures that you'll always have something to sing." Brooke also gave the same score for Let's Sing 2016 and said: "Let's Sing 2016 is practically the same game as Now That's What I Call Sing adapted for the North American audience, which means that it's a pretty solid singing game."

Let's Sing 2017
Known in Europe as Now That's What I Call Sing 2. Released on 14 October 2016 for the Wii, PlayStation 4, and Xbox One. It includes tracks by LMFAO, Justin Bieber, Jason Derulo, Meghan Trainor, John Newman, Calvin Harris, Coldplay, and Twenty One Pilots.

Sam Brooke of Push Square gave the game seven out of ten and summarized: "NOW That's What I Call Sing 2 isn't anything special, but it's a decent karaoke game that you'll have fun playing with friends. The tracklist may only appeal to a certain audience, but singing along to cheesy pop songs is part of the fun, and the variety of modes does just enough to prevent it from getting boring."

Let's Sing 2018
Announced on 19 August 2017, released on 23 October 2017 for the Wii and PlayStation 4. Switch version was released on 24 November 2017. The game has a new "Mix Tape" mode. It includes tracks by Coldplay, Alan Walker, Gnash, and Clean Bandit.

Michael Krosta of 4Players gave the game 70 out of 100 and said that it's "[a] rudimentary karaoke package with a fairly recent song selection and an interesting option for four vocalists."

Let's Sing 2019
Announced on 21 August 2018 at Gamescom 2018 for the Wii, PlayStation 4, Xbox One and Switch by Ravenscourt and Voxler. It was released on 25 October 2018 in Europe and on 11 July 2019 in North America.

Francesca Sirtori of IGN gave the game 6.7 out of 10 and said: "Let's Sing 2019 features new mechanics and will let you sing many pop songs with your friends or other players online. Although the graphics and the sound is pretty good, we expected a more various playlist, along with the disappointment of the unavailability to catch screenshots." Simone Pettine of Multiplayer.it gave the game 6.5 out of 10 and said: "Let's Sing 2019 is a nice karaoke for the whole family, but the contents are not so many and not too tidy." Michael Krosta of 4Players gave the game 73 out of 100 and said: "The disputable song selection aside Let's Sing shows promise: With four possible vocalists, the original music videos in the background and asynchronous online sing-offs it offers a lot. Unfortunately the voice recognition leaves something to be desired."

Let's Sing 2020
Announced on 13 August 2019, released on 25 October 2019 for the PlayStation 4, Xbox One, and Switch. It includes tracks by Ava Max, Lewis Capaldi, Rita Ora, Robbie Williams, Spice Girls, and Queen.

Britt Roberts of Nintendo Life gave the game seven out of ten and summarized: "Let's Sing 2020 works as a karaoke video game and the point-focused levelling-up system and subsequent unlockables add a sense of satisfaction as you beat your score, unlock avatars and the use of songs in other play modes. Aside from all this, Let's Sing 2020 has a real sense of fun." Paolo Besser of The Games Machine gave the game seven out of ten and said: "Let's Sing 2020 has a good selection of songs, a series of fun challenges and good evaluation skills. However, the game has crashed repeatedly and its music videos seem to come from a VHS."

Let's Sing Country
Released on 25 October 2019 for PlayStation 4, Xbox One, and Switch. It includes tracks by Cody Johnson, Dustin Lynch, Jimmie Allen, Jake Owen, and Bebe Rexha.

Let's Sing Country received "mixed or average" reviews, according to review aggregator Metacritic. Tyler Treese of Nintendo World Report gave the game 5.5 out of 10 and summarized: "Let's Sing Country is a totally fine karaoke game that has a pretty lacking tracklist. It has made the conversion to Switch just fine as it's easy to read the lyrics even in handheld mode and the mobile phone app means you don't need microphones to have fun. However, there's just not enough songs to make it worth buying for most would-be singers." Eric Hauter of PlayStation Universe gave the game a mixed review. He scored the game a 6.5/10 and writes that "Let's Sing Country provides a way to sing modern radio country songs (and a couple of classics) with friends. If that sounds fun to you, then you will likely enjoy this game. It doesn't need to be more complicated than that." David Chapman of Common Sense Media gave the game two stars out of five, criticizing its song selection as well as its visuals, noting that the music videos included with each song have video quality issues, and expressed that "the game's interface looks like its hokey, generic avatars got carried away with a PowerPoint presentation".

Let's Sing Queen
Announced on 29 July 2020, released on 2 October 2020 for the PlayStation 4, Xbox One, and Switch. It includes tracks by Queen like "Bicycle Race", "We Will Rock You", "Another One Bites the Dust", "I Want to Break Free", and "We Are the Champions".

Let's Sing Queen received "generally positive" reviews, according to review aggregator Metacritic for the PlayStation 4 and Xbox One versions. The Switch version received "mixed or average" reviews. PJ O'Reilly of Nintendo Life summarized: "Let's Sing Queen is a straight-up, no-frills entry in the series that throws you into the legendary super group's awesome back-catalogue of hits across the same selection of modes you'll be accustomed to from previous titles in the series. There are absolutely no surprises here and a definite lack of variety when compared to other offerings in the franchise; however, with thirty (mostly) excellent tracks, accompanied by their highly entertaining original music videos and an official app that turns your mobile phone into an impressively robust mic, this is a solid good time for fans of the titans of rock, karaoke fiends and anyone who just loves to warble along to some classic rock anthems while re-enacting the best bits of Live Aid 1985 in the comfort of their own sitting room." Shaun Musgrave of TouchArcade compared the game to previous entries in the series: "In terms of the UI and the way the game works, there's no change here from previous titles."

Let's Sing 2021
Announced on 21 August 2020, released on 12 November 2020 for the PlayStation 4, Xbox One, and Switch. A new "Legends" mode was added to the game. It features singing challenges against computer controlled opponents. The game includes tracks by Billie Eilish, Tones and I, Jonas Brothers, Panic! at the Disco, Ariana Grande, and Genesis.

Let's Sing 2021 received "mixed or average" reviews, according to review aggregator Metacritic. Michael Krosta of 4Players said: "Technically Let's Sing is an entertaining karaoke game with interesting modes, but also well-known strengths and weaknesses from yesteryears' iterations. And the song choice is rather disappointing." Stefania Netti of Eurogamer gave a positive review and said: "Let's Sing 2021 is beautiful musical experience that makes the player enjoy and improve at the same time."

Let's Sing 2022
Announced 23 August 2021, released on 23 November 2021. It includes tracks from Lady Gaga, Shawn Mendes, Justin Bieber, Ariana Grande, The White Stripes, and Backstreet Boys.

Ollie Reynolds of Nintendo Life gave the game seven out of ten and summarized: "Let's Sing 2022 is a reasonably fun, reliable new entry to a series that continues to play it safe. There's a decent selection of songs on offer, but with a distinct lack of variety, the only other option is to purchase additional five-song packs, which feels a little bit icky." Chad Sapieha of Common Sense Media gave the game three out of five stars.

Let's Sing ABBA
Released on 4 October 2022. It includes tracks from ABBA like "Gimme! Gimme! Gimme!", "Waterloo", "Dancing Queen", "Mamma Mia", and "I Still Have Faith in You".

Let's Sing ABBA received "mixed or average" reviews, according to review aggregator Metacritic. Gavin Lane of Nintendo Life gave the game eight out of ten and summarized: "We'd wager even non-aficionados will be drawn in by the sheer strength of this most familiar and indestructible of pop music songbooks, and the variety of modes here, machine-tooled over many years of iteration and repetition for the long-running Let's Sing series, offer enough variety to engage just about anyone who's ever tapped their foot to any of these tracks. Developer Voxler took absolutely no chances here; Let's Sing Abba is exactly what you think it is. And for that, we were thankful." Giulia Martino of Multiplayer.it gave the game 7.0 out of 10 and said "Let's Sing Abba is the same good old Let's Sing. If you love this iconic band's songs you'll love it, if you are looking for some fresh air or you hate hits like "Gimme! Gimme! Gimme! (A Man After Midnight)" and "Dancing Queen" it's better if you look somewhere else."

Let's Sing 2023
Announced on 16 August 2022, released on 15 November 2022. It includes tracks from Avril Lavigne, Ed Sheeran, Jason Derulo, Billie Eilish, Lil Nas X, Rita Ora, and Charlie Puth.

Dwayne Jenkins of Common Sense Media gave the game two out of five stars.

Let's Sing 2024
Announced on 7 September 2023, released on 7 November 2023.

=== Let's Sing 2025 ===
Announced on 12 September 2024, released on 5 November 2024.

=== Let's Sing 2026 ===
Announced on 30 September 2025, released on 4 November 2025.

=== Let's Sing 2027 ===
Announced on 7 August 2026, with a release date of 3 November 2026, being published by THQ Nordic.

== See also ==
- We Sing
