= Ducati World Racing Challenge =

2001 video game

- Developer: Attention to Detail
- Publisher: Acclaim Entertainment
- Platforms: PlayStation, Microsoft Windows, Dreamcast
- Release: PlayStation: NA: January 2, 2001; EU: February 9, 2001; Windows: NA: February 9, 2001; EU: February 16, 2001; Dreamcast: NA: February 13, 2001; EU: March 9, 2001
- Genre: Racing
- Modes: Single-player, multiplayer

Ducati World Racing Challenge, known in Europe as Ducati World, is a racing game developed by Attention to Detail and published by Acclaim Entertainment for PlayStation, Microsoft Windows, and Dreamcast in 2001.

== Development ==
The game was announced in June 2000.

== Reception ==
Reception

Aggregate score
Aggregator	Score		
Aggregator	Dreamcast	PC	PS
Metacritic	40/100	57/100	68/100

Review scores
Publication	Score		
Publication	Dreamcast	PC	PS
Computer Games Strategy Plus	N/A	2/5	N/A
Electronic Gaming Monthly	4/10	N/A	5.33/10 (Note: In Electronic Gaming Monthly's review of the PlayStation version, two critics gave it each a score of 5/10, and the other gave it 6/10.)
Game Informer	N/A	N/A	5.5/10
GamePro	N/A	N/A	2.5/5
GameRevolution	D	N/A	N/A
GameSpot	N/A	5.4/10	7/10
GameSpy	82%	N/A	N/A
IGN	2.7/10	5.7/10	6/10
Official U.S. PlayStation Magazine	N/A	N/A	2.5/5
PC Gamer (US)	N/A	28%	N/A
BBC Sport	N/A	87%	N/A

The PlayStation and PC versions received "mixed or average reviews", while the Dreamcast version received "unfavorable" reviews, according to the review aggregation website Metacritic. BBC Sport gave the PC version a favorable review, a few weeks before its release date.
