= The Incredible Hulk: The Pantheon Saga =

1997 video game

- North American PlayStation cover art
- Developer: Attention to Detail
- Publisher: Eidos Interactive
- Directors: Chris Gibbs; Fred Gill
- Producers: Dan Llewellyn; Brian Schorr
- Programmers: Lyndon Sharp; Andrew Wright
- Artists: John Dunn; David West; Vincent Shaw-Morton; Richard Priest
- Composer: Des Tong
- Platforms: PlayStation, Sega Saturn
- Release: April 10, 1997
- Genre: Platform
- Mode: Single-player

The Incredible Hulk: The Pantheon Saga is a 1997 video game developed by Attention to Detail and published by Eidos Interactive for the PlayStation and Sega Saturn. The game is based on the Marvel Comics superhero Hulk, who must traverse through a series of levels and destroy enemies with an assortment of offensive and defensive maneuvers. The game features visuals created on Silicon Graphics workstations and a plot based on the Pantheon storyline from the comics. The narrative revolves around the Hulk joining the titular superhero team and fighting such adversaries as Piecemeal, Trauma, and the U-Foes. The game was negatively received for its gameplay, controls, visuals, and music, and has been ranked among the worst superhero-based video games.

== Gameplay ==
An example of gameplay.

The Incredible Hulk: The Pantheon Saga is a third-person game set in three-dimensional areas. The player controls the Hulk, who can walk, run, jump, grab and carry objects, and perform a number of offensive and defensive maneuvers against enemy characters. The game consists of five levels that are divided into three stages, with the exception of the final level. Progress is reserved with passwords, which are given upon the completion of a level; memory cards are not supported. The game's difficulty level can be set to "Easy", "Medium", or "Hard".

The Hulk's health is represented by a meter in the upper-left hand corner of the screen. The meter decreases as the Hulk sustains enemy attacks, and automatically regenerates depending on the difficulty setting. Below the health meter is a gamma meter, which indicates how much power the Hulk has reserved to perform special moves. Different special moves cost more gamma than others, and this cost is also dependent on the difficulty setting. Items can be collected to restore health or gamma, as well as temporarily double the power of the Hulk's attacks. Also collectible are calling cards that can summon a member of the superhero team Pantheon, who will assist the Hulk for a limited time.

== Plot ==
Nuclear physicist Robert Bruce Banner is caught in the blast of an exploding gamma bomb while rescuing Rick Jones. The huge dose of gamma rays alters Banner's genetic structure, causing him to transform into the Hulk, a monstrous being with superhuman strength. The Hulk is taken prisoner by members of the Pantheon, a superhero team which specializes in tactical missions, so that their leader Agamemnon can convince the Hulk his powers can be used to benefit mankind. As Pantheon members Paris and Ulysses transport the Hulk into their secret base, the Mount, their ship crashes, freeing the Hulk. After the Hulk fights through the Mount and defeats Atalanta, Ulysses, Ajax, and Hector, he is assigned by Agamemnon to stop Piecemeal, who has taken hostages in a Scottish castle. The Hulk then rescues Atalanta from Lazarus and Trauma in Antarctica, and thwarts a siege of the Mount by the U-Foes. The Hulk is suddenly transported to the Future Imperfect, where he battles the Maestro (an alternate version of the Hulk) and sends him back in time to the gamma bomb test. The explosion that created the Hulk destroys Maestro.

== Development and release ==
The Incredible Hulk: The Pantheon Saga was developed by British company Attention to Detail and published by Eidos Interactive. The plot is based on the Pantheon storyline by Marvel Comics. Development was directed by Chris Gibbs and Fred Gill. The graphics were created on Silicon Graphics workstations by John Dunn, David West, Vincent Shaw-Morton, and Richard Priest. West created and animated the models for the Hulk, Trauma, and Atalanta, while Dunn created Lazarus, and Shaw-Morton created Hector. Lyndon Sharp and Andrew Wright served as the lead programmers, with Wright creating the graphics engine. The music was composed by Des Tong and features Mike Hehir on guitar and vocals by Chris Warne. The voice acting was provided by Ian Wilson and producer Brian Schorr.

Attention to Detail cited Doom as an influence in the presentation. The robotic nature of the Hulk's enemies was influenced by a proviso from Marvel forbidding the Hulk from killing anyone. The game was unveiled at E3 1996, with a release set for the first quarter of 1997. It was released for the PlayStation and Sega Saturn on April 10, 1997. A PC version was advertised, but not released.

== Reception ==
Reception

Aggregate score
Aggregator	Score
GameRankings	44% (PS1)

Review scores
Publication	Score
AllGame	2.5/5 (PS1); 1.5/5 (SAT)
EP Daily	5/10 (PS1)
GameSpot	2.4/10 (PS1)
IGN	5/10 (PS1)
Sega Saturn Magazine	15% (SAT)

Reception to The Incredible Hulk: The Pantheon Saga was generally negative, obtaining an aggregate score of 44% on GameRankings. Ed Robertson of GameSpot and Stephen Fulljames of Sega Saturn Magazine declared it to be among the worst video games they had recently played. Fulljames further condemned it as "an embarrassment to Eidos, to the developers, to Marvel, and to the Saturn in general." The gameplay was deemed repetitive and tedious, with Robertson saying that the game's straightforwardness resulted in an overly easy difficulty. The controls were considered rough and sluggish, and Victor Lucas of Electric Playground cited the Hulk's tendency to get stuck in corners as a major flaw. Fulljames and Jonathan Sutyak of AllGame complained of difficulty in determining the Hulk's position and lining up attacks, with Fulljames singling out the airborne enemies as "nigh-on impossible to hit". Sutyak regarded the level design as uninspired, repetitive, boring, and padded out by simplistic puzzles involving switches and crates. Fulljames accused the game's license of completely ignoring the Hulk's immense strength and abilities, questioning the necessity of activating doors and lifts when the Hulk should logically circumvent them, and finding the aspect of the Hulk taking significant damage from a profusion of robotic enemies, mines and turrets "preposterous".

Many aspects of the visuals were regarded as poor. The environments were criticized for their flat and blocky construction, bland and grainy textures, and short draw distance, which was said to obscure details like switches. The Hulk's sprite was faulted for its choppy animation and small head, and the enemies were dismissed as dull. Lucas felt that the cutscenes were "nice looking", while Robertson deemed them no better than the in-game graphics. Reactions to the audio were indifferent, with the music being described as "spacey, pasty synth music and a relentlessly bland three note guitar riff", "a generic brand of hard rock", "an irritating blend of dance music and wanna-be goth-rock", and "appalling 'rawk'". While Lucas considered the plot somewhat interesting, Sutyak and Robertson regarded it as weak and confusing.

Henry Gilbert of GamesRadar+, Ben Browne of Screen Rant, and Mason Segall of Comic Book Resources have ranked The Incredible Hulk: The Pantheon Saga among the worst superhero-based video games. They criticized the repetitive combat, awkward controls, fixed camera, bland environments, under-defined Hulk sprite, poor cutscenes, and dull and confusing story. Carl Jackson of Comic Book Resources ranked the short-lived villain Piecemeal among the strangest characters to appear in a Marvel video game, remarking that he does not hold up in hindsight against the villains Maestro and the U-Foes, who also appear in the game.
