= Super Dungeon Bros =

2016 video game

- Cover art for all regions/versions
- Developer: React Games
- Publisher: Wired Productions
- Engine: Unity 5
- Platforms: Windows macOS; PlayStation 4 Xbox One
- Release: Windows, PS4, Xbox One; November 1, 2016 macOS; December 20, 2016
- Genre: Roguelike
- Modes: Single-player, multiplayer

Super Dungeon Bros is a multiplayer-focused roguelike video game developed by React Games and published by Wired Productions. It was released worldwide in November 2016.

== Gameplay ==
The game takes place in the fictional realm of Rökheim which comprises the worlds Cryptheim, Chillheim, and Bogheim, each of which is modeled after a different theme (underground, snow and jungle, respectively). Each location features a randomly generated layout that varies with every playthrough.

Super Dungeon Bros is a fast-paced, top-down action roguelike dungeon crawler. Players select one of four characters and traverse a labyrinth, slaying enemies and collecting coins and spheres of the respective player color while completing an overall objective. Puzzles and light platforming are also encountered throughout the dungeon. Coins are used to purchase extra lives and other power-ups with a merchant that can be found in the dungeons. While coins and upgrades are reset once the player dies or complete 5 dungeons in a level, gems are maintained and can be used to buy cosmetic helmets and new weapons, each one varying in the amount of damage dealt and style of play (for instance, there are ranged and melee weapons). A "threat meter" tracks playtime in a dungeon, with a more powerful boss spawning the longer it takes a player to complete an area.

Each gameplay sessions the players start with a set number of lives, and once diminished the game is over. While in multiplayer, the lives pool is shared. Up to four people may take part at once, either locally or in online co-op. In multiplayer, the lives pool is shared. Alongside online leaderboards are daily and weekly dungeons, which are unique locations only playable during a certain time slot. Cross-platform online play is available between PlayStation 4 and Windows/Mac users as well as Xbox and Windows 10 players.

== Release ==
After numerous delays, the game was released worldwide on November 1, 2016 for PlayStation 4, Xbox One and personal computers. THQ Nordic simultaneously published physical copies in North American and PAL territories. At launch, the game was available for free during the month of November 2016 on Xbox One as part of the Games with Gold service.

The title has received numerous updates since launch. The "broettes" (female equivalents to the four main male characters) were available as a free download for a two-week period after launch before becoming a paid add-on. Update 1.02 was launched for PlayStation 4 and personal computers in December 2016 which included various fixes for glitches, improved load times, the ability to customize the number of players in a game (previously four were required to play) and private match making lobbies. Additionally, compatibility for OS X was added, with Steam players receiving a free download for the Mac version. This patch launched on Xbox One in early 2017.

== Reception ==
Reception

Aggregate scores
Aggregator	Score
GameRankings	(PC) 41.5% (PS4) 50% (XB1) 50.71%
Metacritic	(PS4) 42/100 (XB1) 53/100

Super Dungeon Bros received mixed-to-negative reviews upon release. the game holds scores of 45.1% (PC), 50% (PS4) and 50.71% (Xbox One) on GameRankings, while also holding averages of 42 (PS4) and 53 (Xbox One) on Metacritic. Generally the cooperative play was praised but the game was heavily faulted for various technical shortcomings.
