= Tin Hearts =

- Cover art
- Developer: Rogue Sun
- Publisher: Wired Productions
- Director: Kostas Zarifis
- Composer: Matthew Chastney
- Engine: Unity
- Platforms: Nintendo Switch; PlayStation 4; PlayStation 5; Windows; Xbox One
- Release: 20 April 2023
- Genres: Adventure, puzzle
- Mode: Single-player

Tin Hearts is a 2023 adventure-puzzle video game developed by Rogue Sun and published by Wired Productions for the Nintendo Switch, PlayStation 4, PlayStation 5, Microsoft Windows and Xbox One. Players are tasked to guide a troop of toy soldiers across environments to a goal, whilst avoiding toy-themed obstacles and hazards. Upon release, the game received average reviews for PlayStation, and generally positive reviews for PC and Switch.

== Gameplay ==
The objective of Tin Hearts is to guide a troop of tin soldiers across a path to an end goal, whilst progressing the narrative of Albert J. Butterworth, a Victorian era inventor. Players must manipulate the environment by placing toy blocks to adjust the path of the soldiers, with later levels featuring moving elements such as toy trains or balloons. Enemies, such as Jack-in-the-boxes, also can destroy soldiers if in their path. Players can control the speed of the soldiers' progress and speed up, pause, rewind or fast forward time, using objects such as clocks to do so.

== Reception ==
Reception

Aggregate score
Aggregator	Score
Metacritic	66/100 (PS5); 76/100 (PC); 81/100 (Switch)

Review scores
Publication	Score
Nintendo Life	8/10
Nintendo World Report	8.5/10
Video Games Chronicle	4/5
Screen Rant	6/10
Gaming Age	B
Softpedia	4/5

Tin Hearts received "mixed or average" reviews upon release for PlayStation 5 and "generally favourable" reviews for PC and Switch, according to review aggregator Metacritic. The game received 'Most Wanted Nintendo Switch Game' at Gamescom 2022.
