= Martha Is Dead =

Martha is Dead
- Developer: LKA
- Publisher: Wired Productions
- Engine: Unreal Engine 4
- Platforms: PlayStation 4; PlayStation 5; Windows; Xbox One; Xbox Series X/S
- Release: February 24, 2022
- Genre: Adventure
- Mode: Single-player

Martha is Dead is a psychological thriller game developed by Italian studio LKA and published by Wired Productions for PlayStation 4, PlayStation 5, Windows, Xbox One, and Xbox Series X/S. On January 16, 2024, it was revealed that it would be receiving a live action film adaptation.

== Gameplay ==
Martha Is Dead is a story-driven horror game that is presented in a first-person perspective. There are no enemies to defeat; instead, the user advances through the story's experiences. The game has been described as a walking simulator.

== Plot ==
Set during the late years of World War II in a fictional town in Tuscany within German-occupied Italy, twin sisters Martha and Giulia spend their childhood in their nanny's estate. Martha has been deaf since early childhood. Their father, Erich, serves as a general in the German army. Giulia's nanny recounts the legend of the White Lady, a malicious spirit of a woman who was hung from a tree by her lover on an island in a nearby lake.

One afternoon, as young adults, Giulia asks Martha to accompany her to the lake to take photographs. However, Martha is not in the house the next morning and Giulia takes the photos alone. She discovers her sister's corpse and is found by her parents. Her mother mistakes Giulia for Martha, forcing Giulia to assume her twin sister's identity.

Giulia's mental state deteriorates in the days following her sister's death. While exploring the surrounding woods, Giulia finds the corpse of her boyfriend, Lapo, a soldier of the Italian resistance, before she's shot. Irene finds Giulia and she recovers, though her story is misconstrued in the local newspaper.

After Martha's funeral, Giulia indirectly reveals her identity to her mother by playing the piano. Suspecting that her mother played a role in her sister's death, Giulia obtains instructions to contact the White Lady from her Nanny. After using tarot cards to communicate with her on the island, Giulia obtains the key to her sister's trinket box and wakes up in her estate.

In Martha's trinket box, Giulia finds a letter from Martha explaining she feigned deafness after Irene frightened her during their childhood. She explains that she felt guilty about Irene's favoritism towards her and her disdain towards Giulia, and intended to enrage and be murdered by Irene while Irene was under the impression that she murdered Giulia, so that Giulia could take Martha's place. Martha also confesses to having been pregnant with Lapo's child—she lied to Irene that it was Giulia who was pregnant so that Martha could pretend to be Giulia and become the casualty of her mother's wrath.

Giulia travels to her family's crypt and disembowels Martha's body to retrieve the deceased fetus. Giulia discovers that Irene has made arrangements with a mental asylum to take Giulia away and travels back to the estate. Before developing the reel of film from the day Martha died, Giulia interrogates and shoots Irene, finding the key to her childhood bedroom. Suddenly, bombs strike the estate and remove power to the house.

Giulia comes to and revisits her childhood bedroom. She plays with her puppet theatre, recounting dismembering her mother and burying her body under a bridge. She visits her mother's grave, then returns to the estate to find power has returned.

Giulia develops the reel and learns that she was the one who killed Martha, not her mother. She's ambushed by soldiers from the Italian resistance and tortured alongside her father, Erich, who is killed.

Now alone, Giulia returns to the darkroom and plays a recording of her mother's confession, which reveals that Martha does not exist as Giulia's twin sister—rather, Giulia is an alternate personality of Martha. She plays with her puppet theater once more, walking through her rough upbringing in which Irene's abusive parenting caused a split in Martha's personality: a quiet, beloved Martha and troublesome, loathed Giulia.

In the present, Giulia calls the town's priest, who convinces her to come to the church, where staff from the mental asylum finally take her away. In her headspace, Giulia talks to an alternate ego of herself and considers what events were fact and which were fiction. Regardless of the player's choices for her responses, the sequence ends with Giulia slitting her forearms.

In her narration, Giulia states that she has since recovered and can put the events of the past behind her.

== Reception ==
Reception

Aggregate score
Aggregator	Score
Metacritic	PC: 73/100; PS5: 72/100; XONE: 58/100; XSXS: 65/100

Review scores
Publication	Score
Adventure Gamers	1.5/5
Electronic Gaming Monthly	2/5
Game Informer	6/10
GamesRadar+	3.5/5
IGN	7/10
Push Square	6/10
Video Games Chronicle	4/5
VideoGamer.com	6/10

Martha Is Dead received "mixed or average" reviews, according to review aggregator Metacritic.

The game was censored for its release on PlayStation consoles. The changes include removing interactivity from certain graphic scenes and removing references to masturbation. The game is uncut on all other platforms.

Critics generally praised the game's visual presentation, atmosphere, and recreation of 1940s Tuscany. Chris Scullion of Video Games Chronicle described its setting as convincingly realized and highlighted its haunting soundtrack, although he warned that its graphic content would not appeal to all players. Stuart Gipp of Push Square similarly praised the Tuscan landscapes, historical details, and photography sequences, but criticized the inconsistent gameplay and reported performance issues, including stuttering and a game-breaking bug in the PlayStation 5 version.
