= Lego Racers 2 =

2001 video game

- Developers: Attention to Detail; Pocket Studios (GBA)
- Publisher: Lego Software
- Platforms: Windows, PlayStation 2, Game Boy Advance
- Release: Windows: UK: September 21, 2001; NA: October 2, 2001; PlayStation 2: EU: September 2001; NA: October 2, 2001; Game Boy Advance: NA: November 27, 2001; EU: December 7, 2001
- Genre: Racing
- Modes: Single-player, multiplayer

Lego Racers 2 is a Lego-themed racing video game developed by Attention to Detail, published by Lego Software and distributed in North America by Electronic Arts. It was first released in September 2001 for Windows, PlayStation 2 and Game Boy Advance. It is the sequel to the 1999 game Lego Racers. This sequel was first revealed by Lego Software on August 20, 2001.

== Gameplay ==
Unlike the original Lego Racers, the player has more "freedom", because the player can race or drive freely, and there are other characters that the player can talk to. Lego Racers 2 also has, like in the original, a car and characters designer. It has more bricks but fewer characters to make and edit. In Lego Racers 2, up to 11 opponents can be chosen. In any race, the racers have to drive through a set of checkpoints each lap in the correct order. There are four different weapons that can be used to damage the opponents' cars, as well as an invisibility shield. The player gets these weapons and the shield by collecting bubbles which randomly assign the player an item, assuming the player doesn't have one already. On each track there is a pair of pink fences which any racer can drive in-between to repair their car, partially or completely depending on the amount of damage and how much time is spent there. If a vehicle gets destroyed, the character is forced to run slowly on foot until the character enters a repair station and gains back their vehicle.

The main mode of the game is a single-player open-world adventure game featuring a galaxy of five worlds: Sandy Bay, Dino Island, Mars, the Arctic, and Xalax. The goal is to enter Xalax and beat the reigning galactic racing champion, Rocket Racer. Except for Sandy Bay, each world contains four races against five casual AI drivers from that world, a final boss race and a lobby connecting all five races. Each world also contains three hidden golden bricks and two hidden bonus games. When entering any world for the first time, the player builds his own car or chooses between Sparky's pre-built cars for that world. The player then drives around each world using their car for that world to access and enter all activities. To gain access to new worlds, the player must collect golden bricks by winning non-boss races and finding hidden golden bricks in each world. The player starts at Sandy Bay and there they face a construction worker, a postman, a fireman and a policeman in four separate races. Each race is 2–4 laps long. The game features a player assistant named Sparky, who guides, advises and supports the player and allows the player to save their game and explore each world to find golden bricks and bonus games. By beating bosses and bonus games, the player collects power-ups that make their car faster, more stable on the ground or more resistant to taking damage.

== Reception ==
Lego Racers 2 was rated average to positive. The PC version was given a score of 7.8 out of 10 by IGN; the reviewer praised its graphics and gameplay, but criticized the voice and talk which were derided as "cartoon gibberish". IGN rated the PS2 version only 6 out of 10, which corresponding graphics and gameplay were inferior to its PC counterpart. An additional note is that a copy cost $20 for PC, but $40 for PS2; the reviewer thought the latter to be poor value for money, while the PC version, at half the cost, was acceptable.

== Sequel ==
Electronic Arts, which signed a contract with Lego Software (formerly Lego Media, later renamed to Lego Interactive) to co-publish their titles in December 2001, revealed their line-up for E3 2002, which covered Drome Racers (known in development as Lego Racers 3), a successor to the Lego Racers series, again developed by Attention to Detail. Microsoft Windows and PlayStation 2 versions of the game were shown at E3 and ECTS. The game did not pick up the story of either of the two predecessors, and focused more heavily on tracks based around Lego Technic sets, rather than various themes. The game was released in November 2002, but to lesser acclaim. The game was panned by critics who thought that the game was lacking features that were essential to the first two games, such as building your own driver and vehicle from Lego bricks, though others considered Drome Racers to be its own title outside Lego Racers, and presents solid gameplay and visual appeal individually. Attention to Detail went into liquidation on August 28, 2003, just shortly before the release of Drome Racers' port to GameCube.
