= Avicii Invector =

2019 multi-player music video game

- Video game poster featuring Avicii
- Developers: Hello There Games; Wired Productions
- Publisher: Wired Productions
- Platforms: Microsoft Windows; PlayStation 4; Xbox One; Nintendo Switch; Stadia; Meta Quest 2
- Release: Microsoft Windows, PlayStation 4, Xbox One; 10 December 2019; Nintendo Switch; 8 September 2020; Stadia; 1 March 2021; Meta Quest; 27 January 2022
- Genre: Music
- Modes: Single-player, multiplayer

Avicii Invector is a 2019 music video game developed by Swedish studio Hello There Games with Wired Productions, in memory of Swedish DJ Avicii, who died in April 2018. The game was released on 10 December 2019 for PlayStation 4, Xbox One, and Microsoft Windows. An "Encore Edition" featuring an additional 10 tracks, which is also available separately as DLC for existing owners, was released on 8 September 2020 on all existing platforms, and Nintendo Switch. The game was originally released for PlayStation 4 on December 6, 2017 as "Invector", with only 22 tracks. The 2019 version was given for free to owners of the original version. The game was later re-released on Stadia on March 1, 2021. A version for Meta Quest 2 released on January 27, 2022.

== Gameplay ==
Avicii Invector allows the player to journey across six different worlds. The player has to race through the music track and is tasked with matching the "musical beat". The game features 25 of Avicii's songs. Encore Edition featured 35 of Avicii's songs, added 10 songs (including "Peace of Mind", "Freak" and the chart topping "SOS") and a new world.

== Reception ==
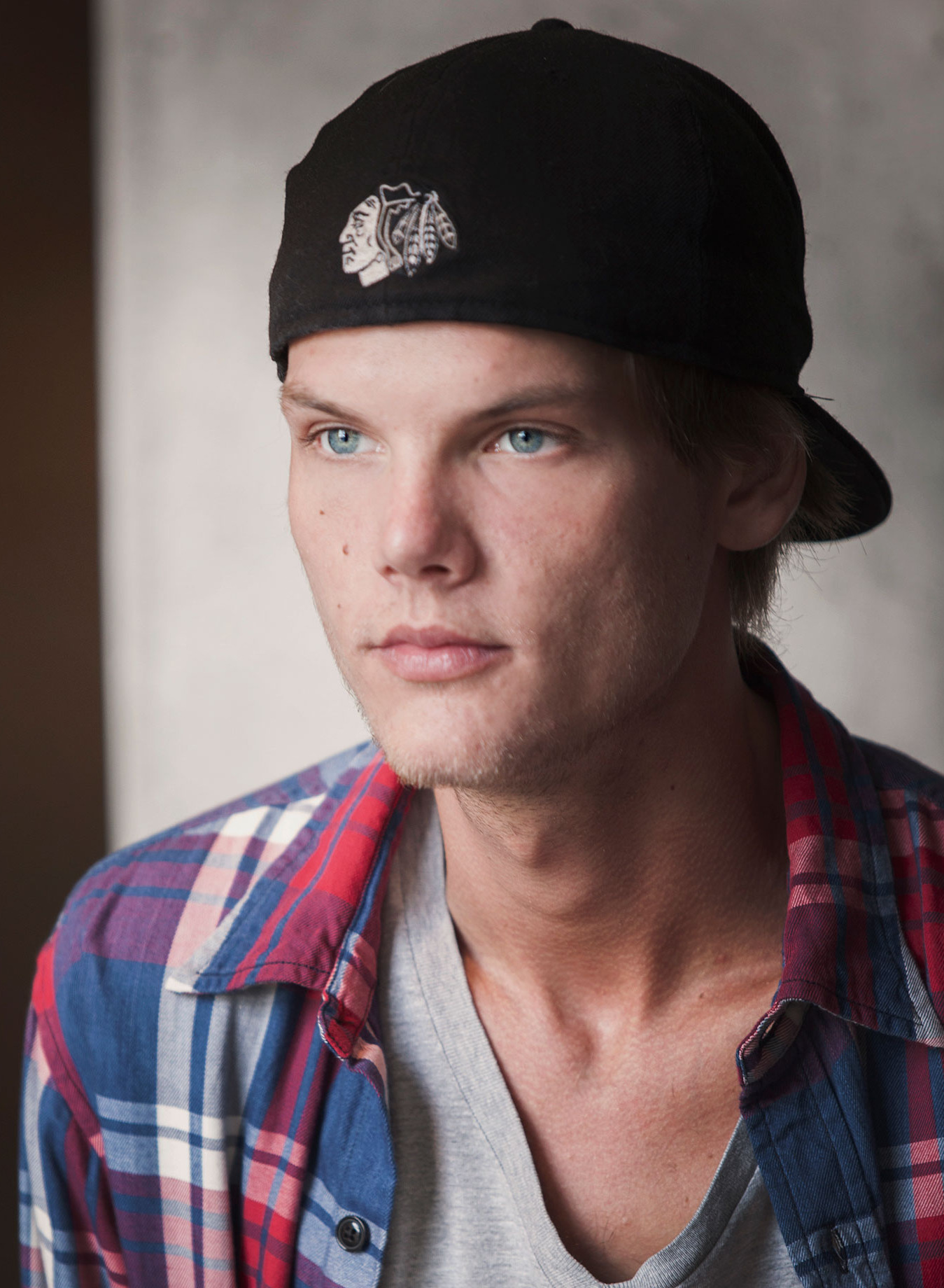
The video game is dedicated to Avicii, who died in April 2018.

=== Critical response ===
Reception

Aggregate score
| Aggregator | Score |
|---|---|
| Metacritic | 80/100 |

Review score
| Publication | Score |
|---|---|
| The Guardian | 4/5 |

Metacritic, which uses a weighted average, assigned the game a score of 80 out of 100, based on 5 critics, indicating "generally favorable reviews".

Jenni Lada of the PlayStation LifeStyle wrote, "The one thing AVICII Invector really nails is a sense of style. It's a futuristic and minimalistic game following a spaceship pilot who is traveling through the songs you play". Jade King of the TrustedReviews wrote, "It's heartbreaking that Avicii isn't around to experience a project that he had so much passion for come to fruition, but he'd be proud of what's been accomplished here. It harkens back to rhythm gaming greats while scorching ahead on a path of its own, and for a good cause to boot".

Rebecca April May of TheGuardian.com wrote, "With so much emphasis on art and audio, there was always a risk of style over substance". Sean Munro of the Flickering Myth wrote the game's several cons including "Disappointing lack of challenge", "Hard difficulty is pointlessly gated off", and "No online multiplayer".

== Legacy ==
Hello There Games, the game's developer, developed mobile game Beat Legend: Avicii for Atari, Inc. in 2020. It similarly features 15 tracks of Avicii.
