= Hotel Architect =

2026 construction and management simulation video game

- Developer: Pathos Interactive
- Publisher: Wired Productions
- Engine: Unreal Engine 5
- Platform: Windows
- Release: 14 May 2026
- Genre: Construction and management simulation
- Mode: Single-player

Hotel Architect is a construction and management simulation video game developed by Pathos Interactive and published by Wired Productions. The early access version was available via Steam for Microsoft Windows on 20 May 2025, with the full version was released on 14 May 2026.

== Gameplay ==
Hotel Architect is set in multiple locations across the world, with each location features its own scenario and sandbox modes. Much like Prison Architect 2, the game features full 3D gameplay and allows players to construct hotels over multiple floors.

== Development and release ==
Hotel Architect is developed by Swedish video game studio Pathos Interactive, and published by Wired Productions. Initially sloted for a 2024 early access release, the early access version was launched for Microsoft Windows on 20 May 2025. The full version was launched on 14 May 2026.
