= Kaboom Studios =

British holding company

Kaboom Studios Limited
- Formerly: Geoff Brown Holdings Limited (1997–2000)
- Type: Private
- Industry: Video games
- Founded: January 1997; 29 years ago
- Founder: Geoff Brown
- Defunct: 9 September 2003
- Fate: Receivership
- Headquarters: England
- Key people: Geoff Brown
- Subsidiaries: Attention to Detail; Audiomotion; Pivotal Games; Silicon Dreams Studio

Kaboom Studios Limited (formerly Geoff Brown Holdings Limited) was a British holding company established by Geoff Brown in January 1997 to pursue video game development investment.

== History ==
In December 1996, Geoff Brown acquired a 75% stake in Silicon Dreams Studio for at least £500,000. Silicon Dreams Studio was founded by Brown in March 1994, as in-house development team for his publishing company, U.S. Gold, until the entire CentreGold umbrella (including U.S. Gold and Silicon Dreams) was sold to Eidos Interactive in April 1996. In January 1997, Brown also acquired Attention to Detail, and opened Geoff Brown Holdings to manage the majority ownerships in the two studios. A motion capture studio, Audiomotion, was established under the Geoff Brown Holdings umbrella in 1997, and Pivotal Games, another developer, was acquired by the company in August 2000.

In 2003, Kaboom Studios faced major financial issues, resulting in the closure of Attention to Detail and Silicon Dreams Studio on 28 August 2003 and 3 September 2003, respectively. Meanwhile, Audiomotion's Mick Morris performed a management buyout for the company, in order for Audiomotion to "reboot" itself and avoid closure. Kaboom Studios went into receivership on 9 September 2003, with all assets being transferred to Ernst & Young, of which the still-active Pivotal Games was put up for sale. On 29 September 2003, SCi Games acquired Pivotal Games from Ernst & Young for a total of £2.36 million.
