= Rollcage (video game) =

1999 video game

- Developer: Attention to Detail
- Publisher: Psygnosis
- Producer: Stuart Tilley
- Programmer: Steve Bennett
- Artist: Richard Priest
- Platforms: Windows, PlayStation
- Release: EU: 12 March 1999; NA: 24 March 1999
- Genre: Racing
- Modes: Single-player, multiplayer

Rollcage is a 1999 racing video game developed by Attention to Detail and published by Psygnosis for the PlayStation and Microsoft Windows. It was followed by a sequel titled Rollcage Stage II.

== Gameplay ==
Screenshot of Rollcage on PC

The game's selling point was its unique physics engine, in which cars could drive on walls or ceilings due to the airflow passing over them at extreme speeds.

== Soundtrack ==
The game featured an original soundtrack by various artists, including the Fatboy Slim song "Love Island" from the album You've Come A Long Way, Baby. Psygnosis also released a limited edition audio CD soundtrack in the US. GameSpot described the musical style as a "blend of techno and industrial music."

== Reception ==
Reception

Aggregate score
| Aggregator | Score | |
| Aggregator | PC | PS |
|---|---|---|
| GameRankings | 74% | 79% |

Review scores
| Publication | Score | |
| Publication | PC | PS |
|---|---|---|
| CNET Gamecenter | 7/10 | 8/10 |
| Computer Games Strategy Plus | 3/5 | N/A |
| Computer Gaming World | 3/5 | N/A |
| Edge | N/A | 7/10 |
| Electronic Gaming Monthly | N/A | 6.625/10 |
| Game Informer | N/A | 7/10 |
| GameFan | 92% | 84% |
| GameRevolution | N/A | B |
| GameSpot | 7.9/10 | 6.2/10 |
| IGN | 5.2/10 | 9/10 |
| Next Generation | N/A | 4/5 |
| Official U.S. PlayStation Magazine | N/A | 3.5/5 |
| PC Accelerator | 8/10 | N/A |
| PC Gamer (US) | 77% | N/A |
| The Cincinnati Enquirer | N/A | 2/4 |

The PlayStation version of Rollcage received "favorable" reviews, while the PC version received "average" reviews, according to the review aggregation website GameRankings. Next Generation said of the former console version, "Anyone with a hankering for fast cars and pretty explosions should be sure to give Rollcage a chance."

Joshua Romero of AllGame gave the PC version four-and-a-half stars out of five, saying, "If you have a 3D accelerator and have any taking to a great game, you shouldn't pass up Rollcage. True, PC players don't have the convenience that console players have and can rent the game, but Rollcage is worth the cash, no matter what system." He also gave the PlayStation version four stars, saying, "If you're into futuristic auto-combat/racing games and looking for something aside from Wipeout, give Rollcage a try. I'm guessing you won't be disappointed."

== Updates and sequels ==
A sequel, Rollcage Stage II, was released in 2000 for PlayStation and Windows.

In 2014, one of the former developers, Robert Baker, released an unofficial update to address remaining bugs and support newer hardware under the name "Rollcage Redux".

Baker and former tradesman Chris Mallinson, later in 2018, under the company name Caged Element, along with the publisher Wired Productions, released Rollcage's spiritual successor Grip: Combat Racing.
