= The Falconeer =

- Developer: Tomas Sala
- Publisher: Wired Productions
- Composer: Benedict Nichols
- Engine: Unity
- Platforms: Microsoft Windows; Xbox One; Xbox Series X/S; Amazon Luna; PlayStation 4; PlayStation 5; Nintendo Switch; Stadia
- Release: Microsoft Windows, Xbox One, Xbox Series X/S; November 10, 2020; Amazon Luna; June 17, 2021; Warrior Edition; PlayStation 4, PlayStation 5, Nintendo Switch; August 5, 2021; Stadia; October 5, 2021
- Genre: Aerial combat
- Mode: Single-player

The Falconeer is a 2020 aerial combat video game developed by Tomas Sala and published by Wired Productions. It was released on November 10, 2020 for Windows, Xbox One and as a launch title for Xbox Series X/S. A version for Amazon Luna was made available on June 17, 2021. It received both good and mixed reviews upon release, with outlets praising its uncompromising vision and homage to the niche dogfighting genre, while the same elements were looked upon less kindly by other reviewers.

An enhanced version of the game, titled The Falconeer: Warrior Edition was released for PlayStation 4, PlayStation 5 and Nintendo Switch on August 5, 2021, receiving positive reviews. It was later ported to Stadia on October 5, 2021.

== Gameplay ==
Set in a nautical /scifi backdrop named the Great Ursee, The Falconeer is a third-person arcade flight video game in which the player assumes control of a pilot commandeering a massive warbird. In the game, the player needs to shoot down rival enemies while dodging hostile attacks. Players need to manage the warbird's stamina while performing various moves and maneuvers. In addition to completing the narrative campaign, the player can freely explore the open world and finish different side missions such as completing bounties and delivering items. As players progress in the game, they can purchase new weapons. The player can also acquire mutagens that can be used to improve the Warbird's basic attributes such as agility and health. In different chapters, which can be completed in any order, the player will control pilots from different factions and command a new warbird.

== Development ==
The Falconeer is the debut title for solo developer Tomas Sala. Sala co-founded a work-for-hire studio in Amsterdam, Netherlands named Little Chicken Game Company before he embarked on a solo career. He worked on a mod for The Elder Scrolls: Skyrim named Moonpath to Elsweyr as a side project, though the mod received positive reactions from the community, which encouraged him to commence work on an original project. He started working on a title named Oberon's Court in 2013. However, it was cancelled because the game was deemed too dark. Commenting on its cancellation, Sala added that "I couldn't finish it, because it was too dark, it was too confronting". Using the assets and the codes of Oberon's Court, Sala quickly built a prototype for a new game, inspired by aerial combat games he used to enjoy during his childhood, such as Star Wars: TIE Fighter, Secret Weapons of the Luftwaffe, Aces of the Pacific, Red Baron, and Crimson Skies. The prototype soon became the foundation for The Falconeer.

The Falconeer features a highly technical art style that does away with the accepted practice of using textures. This means that instead of using image files to give 3D models material properties and depth, everything in The Falconeer from the user interfaces to the 3D world and characters utilize techniques that replace textures with math based generated colors and definitions. Examples range from the ocean and cloud effects to the NPC portraits which are generated off random seeds. Procedural and generative visuals are said to have been essential for Tomas Sala to be able to develop the game largely by himself. While Sala made the game on his own, Benedict Nichols served as the game's composer.

== Release ==
Wired Productions agreed to publish the game in early 2019. A beta for the game was released for PC players in October 2020. The game was released on November 10, 2020 for Windows, Xbox One, and as a launch title for Xbox Series X and Series S.

On December 22, 2020 a named update was released called the Kraken, which addressed some of the criticisms regarding difficulty and open world activities, adding exploration missions and wreck dive missions that included monstrous events. It was made available for Xbox Game Pass subscribers on February 4, 2021. On the same day, Sala released a downloadable content pack named The Hunter, which adds additional outfits, a new weapon, and a dragon into the game. The game was released for Amazon Luna on June 17, 2021.

An enhanced version of the game, titled The Falconeer: Warrior Edition was announced in May 2021 and was released for PlayStation 4, PlayStation 5 and Nintendo Switch on August 5, 2021.

== Reception ==
Reception

Aggregate scores
Aggregator	Score
Metacritic	PS5: 74/100; Switch: 80/100; PC: 68/100; XONE: 62/100; XSX: 65/100
OpenCritic	40% recommend

Review scores
Publication	Score
Computer Games Magazine	7/10
Destructoid	6/10
Eurogamer	Recommended
GamesRadar+	3.5/5
Nintendo World Report	8.5/10
PC Gamer (US)	78/100
Push Square	7/10
The Guardian	3/5

The game initially received mixed or average reviews upon release according to review aggregator Metacritic. Fellow review aggregator OpenCritic assessed that the game received fair approval, being recommended by 40% of critics. Critics generally liked the game's setting, lore and graphics. However, criticisms were directed at the game's combat and the lack of meaningful activities in its open world. The Warrior Edition which was launched August 5 and included major improvements, all previous DLC and new DLC titled 'Edge of the World' was received much more favourably with the Switch release reaching a Metacritic score of 80/100.

The game received a BAFTA game award nomination for Best Debut Game in March 2021.

== Spin-off ==
A spin-off game titled Bulwark: Falconeer Chronicles was released on March 26, 2024. Unlike The Falconeer, Bulwark is a city-builder and an exploration game which tasks players to journey across a post-apocalyptic waterworld named the "Great Ursee" and rebuild a fallen civilization.
