= The Last Worker =

- Developers: Wolf & Wood; Oiffy
- Publisher: Wired Productions
- Engine: Unity
- Platforms: Nintendo Switch; PlayStation 5; Windows; Xbox Series X/S
- Release: WW: March 30, 2023
- Genre: Adventure
- Mode: Single-player

The Last Worker is an adventure video game developed by Wolf & Wood and Oiffy. Wired Productions published it in 2023 for multiple platforms. It is a satirical take on big tech and has the player perform puzzles inspired by warehouse workers.

== Gameplay ==
Players control the last human worker in an otherwise automated fulfillment center. At first, players solve puzzles to correctly sort packages. After the protagonist is convinced by revolutionaries to sabotage the facility, stealth game elements are added, and players must engage in additional puzzles while maintaining high productivity levels. If their productivity falls below a certain level, they are fired from their job. Players are assisted by a robot sidekick named Skew. As the revolutionaries' demands become greater, players must choose whether they wish to continue assisting the revolutionaries, ally with the tech CEO who owns the warehouse, or seek more personal fulfillment.

== Development ==
The Last Worker feature comic book-style art by Mike McMahon. Voice actors include Ólafur Darri Ólafsson, Jason Isaacs, and Clare-Hope Ashitey. Wired Productions released the game for Nintendo Switch, PlayStation 5, Windows, and Xbox Series X/S on March 30. It supports the PlayStation VR2 and Quest 2.

== Reception ==
On Metacritic, the PC and PlayStation 5 versions received mixed reviews, and the Xbox Series X/S version received positive reviews. Rock Paper Shotgun felt the tasks meant to be rote were more compelling than the later puzzles involving stealth and sabotage. Though they praised McMahon's art, they said the satire "lays its ideas on far too thick". Though they said it explained its jokes too often and lacked the poignancy of other recent satirical games, PC Gamer called it "a breezy, charming caper with a broad anti-corporate theme". The Guardian and Slant Magazine were more negative; they felt the satire was superficial and ignored real-world concerns about sweat shops in favor of what seemed to them like an unearned and unconvincing story of rebellion. Nintendo Life wrote, "It's likeable and well-packaged with plenty of character, but it doesn't always deliver", finding some of the puzzles "fiddly". Push Square criticized the game's implementation of virtual reality on the PlayStation and said that some puzzles are better played without it.
