= Fractured Minds =

2017 puzzle role-playing video game

- Developer: Emily Mitchell
- Publisher: Wired Productions
- Producer: Emily Mitchell
- Composer: Kai Engel
- Engine: Unity (game engine)
- Platforms: PlayStation 4; Xbox One; Microsoft Windows; iOS; Android; Nintendo Switch
- Release: November 14, 2017
- Genres: Role-playing, puzzle
- Mode: Single-player

Fractured Minds is a puzzle role-playing video game developed by British game designer Emily Mitchell and published by Wired Productions for PlayStation 4, Xbox One, Microsoft Windows, iOS, and Nintendo Switch. It was released worldwide in November 14, 2017. Mitchell won a 2017 British Academy of Film and Television Arts (BAFTA) Award for Game Making for Fractured Minds.

The Academy described Fractured Minds as an "immersive puzzle game" which gives players "genuine insight into the experiences of those [...] living with mental illness -- the feelings of isolation, of being trapped, [and] of everyday situations being distorted beyond recognition". 80% of the proceeds from the sale of Fractured Mind go to Safe In Our World, a charitable group in the video games industry that supports World Mental Health Day and provides other services for those living with mental health complications.

== Gameplay ==
Players take control of a nameless protagonist and progress through six bleak atmospheric chapters, each of which represent a different challenge associated with mental illness, such as isolation, paranoia, and anxiety. Though the experiences portrayed in the game are loosely inspired by real life day-to-day occurrences, the viewpoint character's mental health issues render them disturbing and distorted beyond recognition. The viewpoint character progresses through a personal and emotional journey until the resolution of the game.

== Development ==
Emily Mitchell, a British programmer from Watford, United Kingdom developed the game on her own at the age of 17. She states that the game was inspired by her own battles with anxiety and that her goal was to create a genuine experience that would help more people empathize with those struggling with mental health issues. The game was later picked up for distribution by Wired Productions, a game publishing firm also based in Watford.

The game's soundtrack was provided by Russian composer Kai Engel.

== Reception ==
Critical Hit magazine hailed the game as a "concentrated, clever exploration of life with mental illness". Though noting its 'just starting out with game dev' aesthetic, the review praised the game's unnerving atmosphere and deep meaning, comparing it to the psychological horror film The Babadook.

The British Academy of Film and Television Arts (BAFTA) praised the game as well, honoring it with its 2017 award for game making. BAFTA described it as an "immersive puzzle game" which gives players "genuine insight into the experiences of those [...] living with mental illness—the feelings of isolation, of being trapped, [and] of everyday situations being distorted beyond recognition.
