= Night Shift (video game) =

1990 video game

- ZX Spectrum cover
- Developer: Attention to Detail
- Publishers: NA: Lucasfilm Games; EU: U.S. Gold
- Programmer: John Mullins
- Platforms: MS-DOS, ZX Spectrum, Amstrad CPC, Commodore 64, Amiga, Atari ST
- Release: October 1990
- Genre: Action
- Mode: Single-player

Night Shift is a video game developed by Attention to Detail and published in 1990 by Lucasfilm Games. It is an action game where the hero is a worker in a factory owned by Industrial Might and Logic (a parody of Industrial Light & Magic). The player's character ensures that the factory is working properly as it cranks out Star Wars action figures, including those of stormtroopers and Darth Vader. The object of the game is to always ensure the factory is working properly, and to move into increasingly better homes.

== Development ==
Developed by Jon Dean, Chris Gibbs, Fred Gill, John Steele, Jim Torjussen, and Martin Green, the game was first conceived as Fixit, revolving around a factory worker trying to keep a machine nicknamed "Beast" from breaking down, while simultaneously needing to charge it with a bicycle-based generator every few minutes. Inspired by Gibbs' childhood love of engineering, who built upon the idea and suggested that they have the player run through part of the machine as an animated platform game, renaming the project Mr. Fixit. Dean met with LucasArts' producers, who were receptive to the idea but wanted to make use of their existing intellectual properties as well. Dean redesigned the game's concept to tie into them more readily, and added a female playable character to add "feminine appeal" to the title. The game was rebranded Night Shift at the suggestion of LucasArts, and Dean developed the manual around the idea of an employee handbook, inspired by manuals used in Infocom games.

== Reception ==
Reception

Award
| Publication | Award |
|---|---|
| Crash | Crash Smash |
