= Gori: Cuddly Carnage =

2024 video game

- Developer: Angry Demon Studio
- Publisher: Wired Productions
- Director: John Kalderon
- Programmers: William Sahl; Sami Puuronen; Carl Pettersson; Patrik Balcerzak
- Artist: Caroline Petri
- Writers: John Kalderon; Christoffer Bodegȧrd; Cassandra Ohlsson
- Composer: William Sahl
- Engine: Unreal Engine 5
- Platforms: Nintendo Switch; PlayStation 4; PlayStation 5; Microsoft Windows; Xbox One; Xbox Series X/S
- Release: 29 August 2024
- Genres: Hack and slash, action-adventure
- Mode: Single player

Gori: Cuddly Carnage is a hack and slash action-adventure video game developed by Angry Demon Studio and published by Wired Productions. The game was released on August 29, 2024, for Nintendo Switch, PlayStation 4, PlayStation 5, Microsoft Windows, Xbox One and Xbox Series X/S.

The player takes the role of Gori, a toy cat, who along with hoverboard F.R.A.N.K., try to save the world from evil toys made by the corporation Cool-Toyz Inc. Gori is the last toy not to be mass-produced. The duo also aim to protect their professor who saved them in the past.

== Development ==
Gori: Cuddly Carnage is developed by Angry Demon Studio, an independent game development studio from Sweden. The game was first unveiled in IGN's virtual Summer of Gaming event in June 2020. In April 2022, Angry Demon initially announced a Windows release in 2023 with England-based publisher Wired Productions serving as its distributor. In September of the same year, Angry Demon Studio CEO John Kalderon announced that the game will also head to all major consoles alongside Windows. In April 2024, after several delays, it was announced to be released on August 29.

On October 29, Angry Demon Studio released a Halloween update which included a "Free For All" mode, Twitch integration, and a Mandarin Chinese voice-over option. Physical copies of the game for both Nintendo Switch and PlayStation 5 were also announced, but are only available for players in the United States and the European region.

== Censorship ==
On June 25, 2024, prior to its release, the game had to be censored in Japan as it was deemed too violent for players in that region. In response, Wired Productions toned down the visceral violence, changed the natural red-colored blood to "purple toy juice" and removed some "dead humans". Two weeks after the censorship in Japan, on July 9, the home console ports for the Chinese and Korean markets were also affected.

== Reception ==
Reception

Aggregate score
Aggregator	Score
Metacritic	(PC) 78/100 (Switch) 76/100 (PS5) 77/100 (XSX) 77/100

Review scores
Publication	Score
Hardcore Gamer	3.5/5
Nintendo Life	6/10
PCGamesN	7/10
Shacknews	9/10
CGMagazine	7.5/10
GameSpew	8/10
The Jimquisition	9/10
MonsterVine	4/5
Slant Magazine	3.5/5

Gori: Cuddly Carnage received "generally favorable" from critics, according to review aggregator Metacritic. T.J. Denzer of Shacknews gave the game a 9, stating: "a bizarrely fun story of sentient cats and killer hoverboards." GameSpew's Richard Seagrave rated the game an 8 out of 10 saying that it's "a good, old-fashioned, stage-based action game that's a blast from start to finish."

Ken Talbot of Nintendo Life gave Gori: Cuddly Carnage a 6 out of 10, praising the character designs and stylish gameplay, but criticizing its comedic tone as vexatious and cartoonish art-style a hit or miss.

=== Accolades ===
Date	Award	Category	Result	Ref.
September 20, 2024	The GDWC Awards	Best Indie Game	Nominated	
