= Tiny Troopers: Joint Ops =

2014 video game

- Developers: Plunge Interactive; Epiphany Games
- Publisher: Wired Productions
- Platforms: PlayStation 3 PlayStation 4 PlayStation Vita; Xbox One
- Release: November 18, 2014
- Genre: Twin-stick shooter

Tiny Troopers: Joint Ops is a twin-stick shooter video game for PlayStation 3, PlayStation 4, PlayStation Vita, and Xbox One. Based on mobile and PC games originally developed by Kukouri Mobile Entertainment, Tiny Troopers: Joint Ops was ported by Plunge Interactive for Sony consoles and by Epiphany Games for the Xbox One, and published by Wired Productions. It was released on November 18, 2014.

The player controls tiny troopers as they battle enemies around the world with special weapons, collect items, and declare victory.

== Reception ==
Reception

Aggregate score
Aggregator	Score
Metacritic	PS3: 64/100; PS4: 65/100; PS Vita: 60/100; XONE: 62/100

Review scores
Publication	Score
GameRevolution	3/5
Pocket Gamer	4/10

Tiny Troopers: Joint Ops received mixed reviews from critics upon release. On Metacritic, the game holds scores of 64/100 for the PlayStation 3 version based on 4 reviews, 65/100 for the PlayStation 4 version based on 4 reviews, 60/100 for the PlayStation Vita version based on 5 reviews, and 62/100 for the Xbox One version based on 12 reviews.
