= Drome Racers =

2002 video game

- North American cover art for PlayStation 2
- Developers: Attention to Detail; Möbius Entertainment (GBA)
- Publishers: Electronic Arts; Lego Interactive; THQ (GBA)
- Director: Drew Wilkins
- Producers: Gavin Cooper; Stuart Tilley; Jonathan Eardley
- Designers: Michael Benfield; Mike McCurdy; Ian Mayor
- Programmer: Andrew Hague
- Composers: John Hancock; Steven Gow; Stafford Bawler; Mark Hyett
- Platforms: Microsoft Windows, GameCube, Game Boy Advance, PlayStation 2
- Release: November 20, 2002: PlayStation 2, Windows; NA: November 20, 2002 (PS2); NA: December 4, 2002 (PC); EU: December 6, 2002 Game Boy Advance; EU: April 11, 2003; NA: June 19, 2003 GameCube; NA: September 16, 2003; EU: September 19, 2003
- Genre: Racing
- Modes: Single-player, multiplayer

Drome Racers is a Lego racing video game developed by Attention to Detail and published by Electronic Arts and Lego Interactive. It was released in 2002 for PlayStation 2 and Microsoft Windows, and later ported to GameCube. A spin-off was also released for Game Boy Advance, which was published by THQ. It is the third Lego racing game, released a year after Lego Racers 2, which was also developed by Attention to Detail. An Xbox version was announced for fall 2003 but cancelled.

== Gameplay and plot ==
Set in the year 2015, Drome Racers is a combination of racing gameplay with the Lego license, offering vehicles based upon the 2002 Lego construction toys. Career mode puts the player in the role of Max Axel, who is tasked with winning the coveted Drome Championship. To do so, he must work his way through the ranks by completing a number of Multi-Challenge Races; a series of races in which the completion time in one round is carried over to the next. For example, if Max finished three seconds behind in the last race, the leader is awarded a three-second head start in the next. The overall winner is the first to cross the finish line in the final race of the series. Preceding each Multi-Challenge series is a qualifying drag race, where victory is determined by a good start and proper gear-shifting.

Max Axel is aided by other such Team Nitro members, such as Shicane, who handles car upgrades, and Rocket, who gives advice. The winnings can be put toward building a new car or upgrading an owned one. The former allows players to select the wheels, chassis, and body type of the new vehicle, each of which is suited to specific conditions and environments. The latter offers five level upgrades in categories, such as engine, aerodynamics, turbo, armor, and tires. Weapons also play a vital role. The arcade mode presents players with Normal or Time Attack racing through a variety of courses, weather conditions, and routes. The Quick Race option allows for instant action by randomly selecting any pertinent variables, including cars and tracks, for either one or two players.

The GameCube version features several enhancements, including an extra power-up that was not in the other versions and a 2-Player Battle Mode, where the goal is to destroy the other player's car with power-ups, though there are variants such as keeping a flag the longest without getting hit. The Battle Mode uses a unique car that cannot be used in normal races and takes place in several special arenas loosely based on the game's tracks, such as the City Arena, which is based on the Foundry track.

== Reception ==
Reception

Aggregate score
Aggregator	Score			
Aggregator	GBA	GameCube	PC	PS2
Metacritic	73/100	54/100	65/100	57/100

Review scores
Publication	Score			
Publication	GBA	GameCube	PC	PS2
Computer Games Magazine	N/A	N/A	3.5/5	N/A
Game Informer	N/A	N/A	N/A	7/10
GameSpot	8.1/10	5.1/10	5.2/10	5.4/10
GameSpy	2/5	N/A	N/A	2.5/5
GameZone	7.7/10	5.5/10	7.5/10	6.3/10
IGN	7/10	6.1/10	6.8/10	6.2/10
Jeuxvideo.com	N/A	11/20	12/20	11/20
Nintendo Power	3.3/5	3.1/5	N/A	N/A
Official U.S. PlayStation Magazine	N/A	N/A	N/A	2.5/5
PC Gamer (US)	N/A	N/A	59%	N/A
The Village Voice	5/10	N/A	N/A	N/A

Drome Racers received "mixed or average" reviews on all platforms according to the review aggregation website Metacritic. Most critics voiced that the gameplay was mediocre, with Ryan Davis of GameSpot saying of the PC version, "What little originality it has, like the qualifying drag races, is seriously underplayed, and most of the experience comes off as generic." A positive review of the same PC version by GameZone's Ovaldog reads, "It has quite a bit to offer and is a blast to play." Nintendo Power gave the GameCube version a mixed review, months before it was released Stateside.

The Game Boy Advance conversion of Drome Racers scored slightly higher than its PC and console counterparts. GameSpot's Frank Provo said, "Drome Racers is the most technically impressive racing game to hit the [Game Boy Advance] in a long, long time." Craig Harris of IGN said that "[the game is] a fun racer, but the controls are just a bit on the loose side."

== Sequels ==
Drome Racers would be the last game developed by Attention to Detail, as the company went into liquidation on August 28, 2003, just shortly before the release of the game's port to GameCube. Reports suggested that the company was working on a fourth installment in the series, tentatively titled Lego Racers 4, and another title, Lego Racers CC, was advertised in Lego catalogs in 2004. Lego Racers 4 had reportedly suffered from significant publisher interference and was reportedly canceled due to budget disagreements as well as feature creep.

In January 2007, Kiloo announced that they were developing two new Lego-themed video games for mobile phones, one of which was titled Lego Racers and featured an original take on the 1999 game's mechanics, projecting a 2007 release. The game was released by Hands-On Mobile later that month to mixed reception, with critics stating that the game lacked any depth and made null and void of the actual usage of Lego bricks in the game.

On December 18, 2007, NetDevil, at the time in charge of developing Lego Universe, announced that it had opened a new web-focused division, which was tasked with developing an Adobe Flash-based game called Lego Racers Challenge, with a projected release date of Q1 2008. NetDevil stated that the move was done in order to compete with other browser games, such as Club Penguin and RuneScape, and to build upon an older, web-based Lego Racers game, entitled Drome Racing Challenge. In late 2008, advertisements for a supposed game titled Lego Racers: The Video Game started appearing on Lego box prints, but, like the other unreleased titles, saw no news afterwards.
