= Ingo Pohlmann =

German pop music singer (born 1972)

Pohlmann
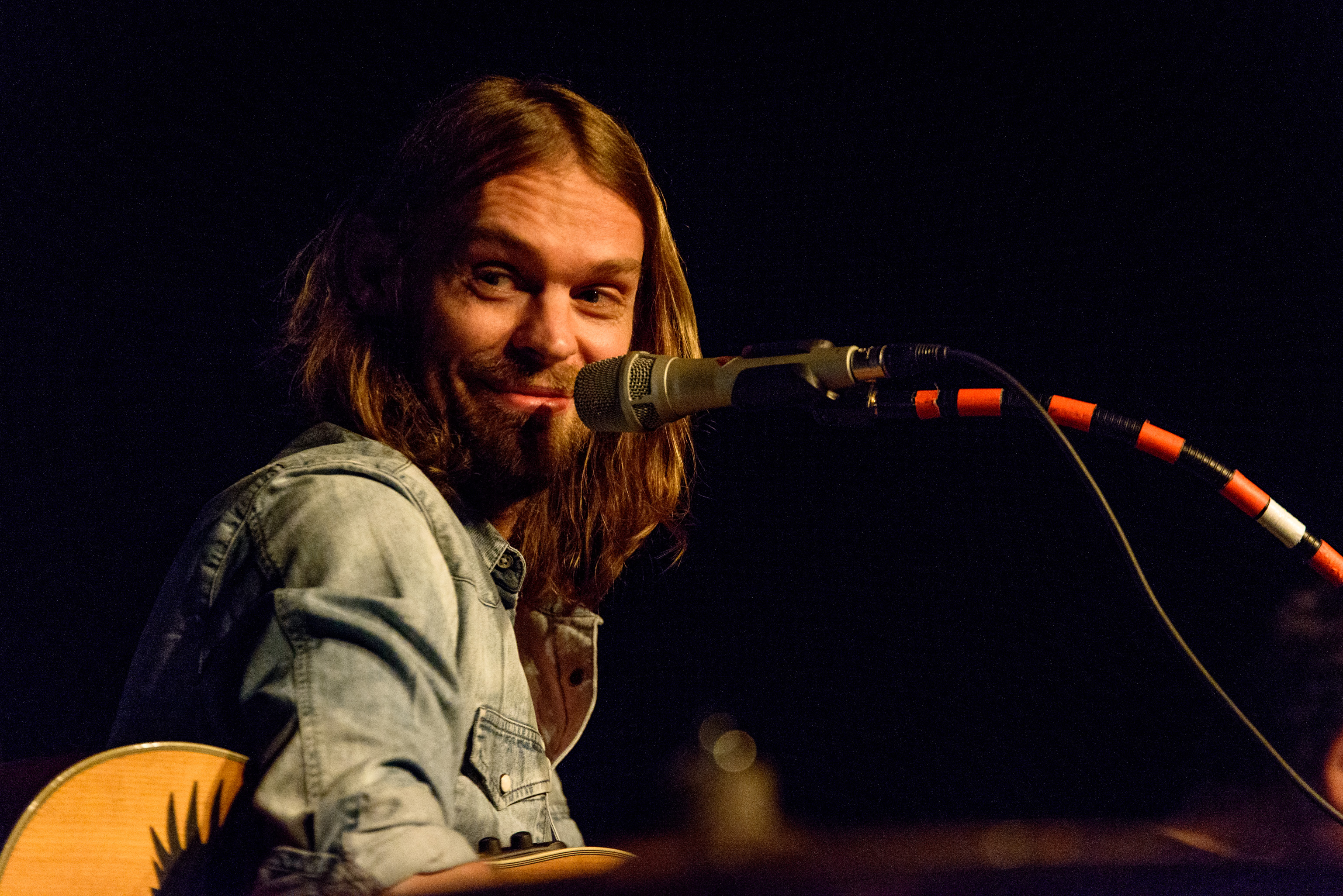
- Ingo Pohlmann

Background information
- Born: Ingo Pohlmann; 18 May 1972 (age 54); Rheda-Wiedenbrück, West Germany (now Germany)
- Origin: Germany
- Genres: Pop
- Occupations: Singer and Guitarist
- Instruments: Voice, Guitar
- Years active: 2006–present
- Label: EMI Music
- Website: http://www.pohlmann-music.de/

Ingo Pohlmann (stage name Pohlmann; born 18 May 1972 in Rheda-Wiedenbrück) is a German pop music singer.

== Biography ==
Pohlmann is a trained bricklayer. After he did his community service, he moved to Münster where he had first appearances. Later, he moved to Hamburg.

His first album "Zwischen Heimweh und Fernsucht" resulted from an association with the producers Jan Löchel, Henning Wehland and Christian Neander.

On 9 February 2007, he took part in the "Bundesvision Song Contest" of the German comedian Stefan Raab. He competed for the federal state North Rhine-Westphalia and came fifth.

== Discography ==
Albums:

- 24 February 2006: "Zwischen Heimweh und Fernsucht"
- 21 September 2007: "Fliegende Fische"
- 17 September 2010: "König der Straßen"
- 10 May 2013: "Nix ohne Grund"
- 23 March 2017: "Weggefährten"

Singles

- 23 June 2006: "Wenn jetzt Sommer wär"
- 6 October 2006: "Der Junge ist verliebt"
- 2 February 2007: "Mädchen und Rabauken"
- 7 September 2007: Wenn es scheint, dass nichts gelingt
- 2 June 2008: "Fliegende Fische"
- 10 September 2010: "Für Dich"
- 28 January 2011: "König der Straßen"
- 3 June 2011: "Wenn sie lächelt EP"
- 14 March 2013: "StarWars"
