= Grip: Combat Racing =

2018 racing video game

- The game's logo is stylized as an ambigram.
- Developer: Caged Element
- Publisher: Wired Productions
- Engine: Unreal Engine 4
- Platforms: Nintendo Switch; PlayStation 4; Windows; Xbox One
- Release: November 6, 2018
- Genre: Racing
- Modes: Single-player, multiplayer

Grip: Combat Racing, often shortened to Grip, is a racing video game developed by Canadian studio, Caged Element and published by Wired Productions for Windows, PlayStation 4, Xbox One, and Nintendo Switch. Warp Digital ported the title to console, and was released for all four platforms on November 6, 2018.

Grip is the spiritual successor to Rollcage, according to Rock, Paper, Shotgun.

== Gameplay ==
Grip: Combat Racing is an arcade racing game in which the player controls a double-sided vehicle capable of driving on its top and bottom. Players can use weapons and powerups to combat opponents as they travel at high speeds around various tracks. When racing, racers are capable of driving on walls and ceilings of the track, given they have enough speed.

Included in the game is a single-player campaign, online multiplayer, and a 4-player split-screen mode (limited to 2-player split-screen on the Nintendo Switch).

=== Game modes ===
The game features 5 race modes and 2 additional modes:

- Race
  - Classic Race - the main race mode, featuring powerups, where the first racer to cross the finish line wins.
  - Ultimate Race - a mode in which points are scored based on attacking opponents with weapons.
  - Elimination Race - a race mode in which the racer in last place is eliminated every 30 seconds.
  - Speed Demon - a race mode with powerups and weapons disabled.
  - Time Trial - a mode in which a single player attempts to earn the fastest time on a given track.
- Arena - a mode set on unique arena tracks with the goal of destroying opponents.
- Carkour - a single-player mode set on unique obstacle-course style tracks, with the goal of reaching the finish line.

== Development ==
In August 2015, Grip was the subject of a Kickstarter campaign with an initial goal of CA$657,000. It raised US$154,000 before Caged Element took the Kickstarter down, but not without announcing that the game would be pushed into Early Access.

== Reception ==
Reception

Aggregate score
Aggregator	Score
Metacritic	NS: 61/100; PC: 74/100; PS4: 71/100; XONE: 69/100

Review scores
Publication	Score
GameRevolution	6/10
Nintendo Life	7/10
Nintendo World Report	6.5/10
Pocket Gamer	3/5
Push Square	6/10
Shacknews	7/10

According to review aggregator platform Metacritic, Grip received "mixed or average reviews".
