= Attention to Detail =

British video game developer

Attention to Detail Ltd
- Logo in 2000
- Type: Subsidiary
- Industry: Video games
- Founded: September 1988; 37 years ago
- Founders: Chris Gibbs; Fred Gill; Martin Green; Jon Steele; Jim Torjussen
- Defunct: 28 August 2003
- Fate: Liquidation
- Headquarters: Hatton, England
- Key people: Chris Gibbs (managing director); Fred Gill (technical director)
- Number of employees: 50 (2003)
- Parent: Kaboom Studios (1997–2003)

Attention to Detail Ltd (ATD) was a British video game developer based in Hatton. Founded by University of Birmingham graduates in September 1988, it was acquired by Kaboom Studios in January 1997. They were known for developing the Rollcage series. The studio shut down in August 2003 due to financial issues at Kaboom Studios.

== History ==
In mid-1987, Chris Gibbs, Martin Green, Nalin Sharma, and Jon Steele created the Atari ST port of Super Sprint for Activision. Sharma had already had experience developing Commodore 64 and contacts in the video game industry, which enabled the group's partnership with Activision. The conversion was finished in twelve weeks. Simultaneously, Fred Gill had developed the game Octan for the ZX Spectrum, which he sold to Firebird. Gibbs, Gill, Green, and Stelle, as well as Jim Torjussen, founded Attention to Detail in September 1988. All founders were University of Birmingham graduates. The company occupied 12,000 square feet (1,100 m^{2}) of converted barns in Hatton, in rural Warwickshire. In January 1997, the company was acquired by Geoff Brown, who established Geoff Brown Holdings (later Kaboom Studios) to manage the ownership. Amid financial struggles at Kaboom Studios and with Attention to Detail unable to find a publisher for Ion Runner, the studio was placed into liquidation on 28 August 2003, laying off all 50 staff members and cancelling Ion Runner.

== Games developed ==
Year	Title	Platform(s)
1990	Night Shift	Amiga, Amstrad CPC, Atari ST, Commodore 64, MS-DOS, ZX Spectrum
1992	Indiana Jones and the Fate of Atlantis: The Action Game	Amiga, Amstrad CPC, Atari ST, Commodore 64, MS-DOS, ZX Spectrum
1993	Cybermorph	Atari Jaguar
1995	Blue Lightning	Atari Jaguar
1995	Battlemorph	Atari Jaguar
1996	Blast Chamber	MS-DOS, PlayStation, Sega Saturn
1996	The Incredible Hulk: The Pantheon Saga	MS-DOS, PlayStation, Sega Saturn
1999	Rollcage	Microsoft Windows, PlayStation
2000	Rollcage Stage II	Microsoft Windows, PlayStation
2000	Sydney 2000	Dreamcast, Microsoft Windows, PlayStation
2001	Ducati World	Dreamcast, Microsoft Windows, PlayStation
2001	Lego Racers 2	Microsoft Windows, PlayStation 2
2002	Salt Lake 2002	Microsoft Windows, PlayStation 2
2002	Firebugs	PlayStation
2002	Drome Racers	Microsoft Windows, GameCube, PlayStation 2
