= Wired Productions =

British video game publisher

- Type: Private
- Industry: Video games
- Founded: 2008; 18 years ago in Watford, United Kingdom
- Founders: Jason Harman; Kevin Leathers; Leo Zullo
- Area served: Worldwide
- Website: wiredproductions.com

Wired Productions is a video game publishing company based in Watford, United Kingdom. It was founded by Jason Harman, Kevin Leathers and Leo Zullo.

== History ==
Before moving into publishing in late 2013, Wired Productions began as a video game production company by producing We Sing Robbie Williams and We Sing. In 2019, Leo Zullo and Neil Broadhead co-founded video games mental health charity Safe In Our World.

In 2017, Wired Productions launched Fractured Minds that won a BAFTA award. In 2020, Wired Productions released The Falconeer. The video game was nominated for Best Debut Game by BAFTA Games Awards.

== Games published ==
Year	Title	Developer(s)	Platform(s)
2013	Let's Fish! Hooked On	SIMS Co., Ltd.	PlayStation Vita
2014	Tiny Troopers Joint Ops	Plunge Interactive	PlayStation 3, PlayStation Vita
2014	The Last Inua	Glowforth	Windows
2015	Tiny Troopers Joint Ops	Plunge Interactive	PlayStation 4, Xbox One
2016	Super Dungeon Bros	React Games	Windows, PlayStation 4, Xbox One
2017	The Town of Light	LKA	Windows, PlayStation 4, Xbox One
2017	Tiny Troopers Joint Ops: XL	Plunge Interactive	Nintendo Switch
2017	Vostok Inc.	NoseBleed Interactive	Nintendo Switch
2017	Surf World Series	Climax Studios	PlayStation 4
2017	Max: The Curse of Brotherhood	Flashbulb Games	PlayStation 4
2017	Fractured Minds	Emily M Games	Windows, Nintendo Switch, PlayStation 4, Xbox One
2018	Max: The Curse of Brotherhood	Flashbulb Games	Nintendo Switch
2018	Shaq Fu: A Legend Reborn	Saber Interactive	Windows, Nintendo Switch, PlayStation 4, Xbox One
2018	Victor Vran : Overkill Edition	Haemimont Games	Nintendo Switch
2018	Grip: Combat Racing	Caged Element	Windows, Nintendo Switch, PlayStation 4, Xbox One
2018	Just Deal with it!	Super Punk Games	PlayStation 4
2018	WordHunters	Thumbfood Ltd	PlayStation 4
2019	Close To The Sun	Storm in a Teacup	Windows, Nintendo Switch, PlayStation 4, Xbox One
2019	Deliver Us The Moon	KeokeN Interactive	Windows
2019	Pool Nation	Cherry Pop Games	PlayStation 4
2019	Avicii Invector	Hello There Games; Wired Productions	Windows, Nintendo Switch, PlayStation 4, Xbox One, Google Stadia
2020	Deliver Us the Moon	KeokeN Interactive	Windows, Nintendo Switch, PlayStation 4, PlayStation 5, Xbox One, Xbox Series X/S
2020	Those Who Remain	Camel 101	Windows, PlayStation 4, Xbox One
2020	Avicii Invector : Encore Edition	Hello There Games	Windows, Nintendo Switch, PlayStation 4, Xbox One
2020	The Falconeer	Tomas Sala	Windows, Nintendo Switch, PlayStation 4, PlayStation 5, Xbox One, Xbox Series X/S, Google Stadia
2020	Lumote: The Mastermote Chronicles	Luminawesome Games Ltd	Windows, Nintendo Switch, PlayStation 4, Xbox One
2022	Arcade Paradise	Nosebleed interactive	Windows, Nintendo Switch, PlayStation 4, PlayStation 5, Xbox One, Xbox Series X/S
2022	Martha Is Dead	LKA	Windows, PlayStation 4, PlayStation 5, Xbox One, Xbox Series X/S
2023	Tiny Troopers: Global Ops	Epiphany Games	Windows, Nintendo Switch, PlayStation 4, PlayStation 5, Xbox One, Xbox Series X/S
2023	The Last Worker	Wolf & Wood, Oiffy	Windows, Nintendo Switch, PlayStation 5, Xbox Series X/S, Oculus Quest
2023	Tin Hearts	Rogue Sun	Windows, Nintendo Switch, PlayStation 4, PlayStation 5, Xbox One, Xbox Series X/S
2024	Bulwark Evolution: Falconeer Chronicles	Tomas Sala	Windows, PlayStation 4, PlayStation 5, Xbox One, Xbox Series X/S
2024	Gori: Cuddly Carnage	Angry Demon Studio	Windows, Nintendo Switch, PlayStation 4, PlayStation 5, Xbox One, Xbox Series X/S
2024	Dig VR	Just Add Water	Windows, PlayStation 5, Meta Quest
2025	Karma: The Dark World	Pollard Studio	Windows, PlayStation 5, Xbox Series X/S
2025	Warhammer 40,000: Speed Freeks	Caged Element	Windows, PlayStation 5, Xbox Series X/S
2025	Beneath	Camel 101	Windows, PlayStation 5, Xbox Series X/S
2025	The Falconeer: Revolution Remaster	Tomas Sala	Windows, PlayStation 5, Xbox Series X/S
2026	Hotel Architect	Pathos Interactive	Windows
2026	BrokenLore: Don't Lie	Serafini Productions	Windows, PlayStation 5, Xbox Series X/S
2026	Agni: Village of Calamity	Separuh Interactive	Windows, PlayStation 5, Xbox Series X/S
TBA	Task Time	ReadGraves	Windows
TBA	When Sirens Fall Silent	LKA	Windows, PlayStation 5, Xbox Series X/S
TBA	ShipShaper	Tomas Sala	Windows
TBA	Mr. Records	Glee-Cheese Studio	Windows, Nintendo Switch 2, PlayStation 5, Xbox Series X/S
TBA	Kumarn: The Wandering Spirit	WereBuff Studio	Windows
