= We Sing Encore =

2010 video game

- Developer: Le Cortex
- Publisher: Nordic Games
- Producer: Wired Productions
- Platform: Wii
- Release: EU: 20 August 2010; AU: 2 September 2010
- Genre: Music
- Modes: Single-player, multiplayer

We Sing Encore is the 2010 music video game sequel to the original We Sing for the Wii. Developed by French studio Le Cortex, produced by Wired Productions, and published by Nordic Games, it is the latest singing game in the series to support 4 players simultaneously each with their own microphone.

We Sing Encore is distributed as a software only version, a two microphone and game bonus pack.

== Gameplay ==
The gameplay is similar to the SingStar set of video games. Players are required to sing along with music in order to score points, matching pitch and rhythm. The game has anticheat technology whereby tapping or humming will register on the screen but no points will be awarded. We Sing Encore also contains the addition of 'Star Notes' that allow the player to score even more points by matching the pitch and rhythm of certain hard to score parts of songs.

== Songs ==
Similarly to We Sing, We Sing Encore has a variety of tracks across multiple genres and decades.

In May 2010, 30 core tracks were announced, and added to all editions. The English, German and Sweden versions all have their own selection of 10 tracks of local hits. The core 30 songs that were announced are:

1. The B-52s - "Love Shack"
2. The Black Eyed Peas - "Shut Up"
3. Bonnie Tyler - "Total Eclipse of the Heart"
4. Cheryl Cole - "Fight For This Love"
5. Coldplay - "Yellow"
6. Elton John - "Tiny Dancer"
7. Gloria Gaynor - "I Will Survive"
8. Gwen Stefani featuring Akon - "The Sweet Escape"
9. Jamiroquai - "Virtual Insanity"
10. Jimmy Ruffin - "What Becomes of the Brokenhearted"
11. Kaiser Chiefs - "Ruby"
12. Katrina & The Waves - "Walking On Sunshine"
13. Las Ketchup - "The Ketchup Song"
14. Lily Allen - "Smile"
15. Lou Bega - "Mambo No 5"
16. Lynyrd Skynyrd - "Sweet Home Alabama"
17. Mika - "Grace Kelly"
18. Natasha Bedingfield - "Unwritten"
19. Pixie Lott - "Mama Do (Uh Oh, Uh Oh)"
20. Plain White Ts - "Hey There Delilah"
21. Right Said Fred - "I'm Too Sexy"
22. Rihanna featuring Jay-Z - "Umbrella"
23. Robyn featuring Kleerup - "With Every Heartbeat"
24. Simply Red - "Holding Back The Years"
25. Soft Cell - "Tainted Love"
26. Spandau Ballet - "Gold"
27. The Supremes - "Baby Love"
28. Taio Cruz - "Break Your Heart"
29. The Veronicas - "Untouched"
30. Westlife - "Flying Without Wings"

The ten English songs that were announced are

1. Florence + The Machine - "Rabbit Heart (Raise It Up)"
2. Girls Aloud - "The Promise"
3. The Saturdays - "Up"
4. Will Young - "Leave Right Now"
5. Kasabian - "Fire"
6. S Club 7 - "Don't Stop Movin'"
7. The Proclaimers - "I'm Gonna Be (500 Miles)"
8. N-Dubz - "I Need You"
9. Stereophonics - "Dakota"
10. The Lightning Seeds - "Three Lions"

The ten German songs that are exclusive to We Sing Vol. 2:

1. 2raumwohnung - 36 Grad
2. The Dandy Warhols - Bohemian Like You
3. Henry Valentino & Uschi - Im Wagen vor mir
4. Jürgen Marcus - Eine neue Liebe ist wie ein neues Leben
5. Pohlmann - Wenn Jetzt Sommer wär
6. Reamonn - Supergirl
7. Roy Black & Anita - Schön ist es auf der Welt zu sein
8. Stereophonics - Dakota
9. Tight Fit - Lion Sleeps Tonight
10. Toploader - Dancing in the Moonlight

The ten Swedish songs that are exclusive to We Sing Vol. 2:

1. Chattanooga - Hallå Hela Pressen
2. Sven Ingvars - Fröken Fräken
3. Eddie Meduza - Gasen i Botten
4. Håkan Hellström - Känn ingen sorg för mig Göteborg
5. Patrik Isaksson - Hos Dig är Jag Underbar
6. Håkan Hellström - Kom igen Lena!
7. The Ark - One of us is gonna die young
8. Björn Skifs - Hooked on a Feeling
9. Fibes, Oh Fibes! - Love Child
10. Fatboy - Way Down Low

== See also ==
- We Sing
- We Sing Robbie Williams
- SingStar
- Karaoke Revolution
- Lips
