= We Sing Robbie Williams =

2010 video game

- Cover art for the game
- Developer: Le Cortex
- Publisher: Nordic Games Publishing
- Producer: Wired Productions
- Platform: Wii
- Release: EU: 12 November 2010; AU: 18 November 2010
- Genre: Music
- Modes: Single-player, multiplayer

We Sing Robbie Williams is the third game in the We Sing series for the Wii, following on from We Sing Encore. Developed by French studio Le Cortex, produced by Wired Productions, and published by Nordic Games Publishing. The game supports up to 4 players simultaneously, who can each use their own microphone. It is also the first edition in this series to feature an artist, which for this edition is Robbie Williams.

We Sing Robbie Williams was announced on 22 July 2010 and was released on 12 November 2010 in conjunction with Robbie Williams' compilation In and Out of Consciousness: The Greatest Hits 1990–2010, which was released in October 2010.

== Gameplay ==
The game's core features include singing lessons, solo, party and, Karaoke modes. The gameplay is similar to the SingStar set of video games, as players are required to sing along with music to score points, matching pitch and rhythm. The players can choose to play at an easy, medium, or hard difficulty, with both short or full-length song options. After the player finishes singing, they can replay their performance; and get statistics about their performance.

Due to hardware limitations, with the Wii only having two USB ports, a USB hub is required to add more USB ports. The game uses the standard Logitech USB microphone for the Wii.

== Tracks ==
We Sing Robbie Williams features 25 songs from seven albums between 1997 and 2010.

1. "Old Before I Die" (1997)
2. "Angels" (1997)
3. "Let Me Entertain You" (1998)
4. "No Regrets" (1998)
5. "Strong" (1999)
6. "She's the One" (1999)
7. "Rock DJ" (2000)
8. "Kids" (2000)
9. "Supreme" (2000)
10. "Let Love Be Your Energy" (2001)
11. "The Road to Mandalay" (2001)
12. "Eternity" (2001)
13. "Somethin' Stupid" (2001)
14. "Beyond the Sea" (2001)
15. "Mr. Bojangles" (2002)
16. "Feel" (2002)
17. "Come Undone" (2003)
18. "Something Beautiful" (2003)
19. "Sexed Up" (2003)
20. "Radio" (2004)
21. "Tripping" (2005)
22. "Advertising Space" (2005)
23. "Sin Sin Sin" (2006)
24. "Bodies" (2009)
25. "You Know Me" (2009)
26. "Shame" (featuring Gary Barlow, 2010)

It was announced on 11 October 2010 that the single "Shame", featuring both Williams and Barlow, would be included as an extra 26th track.

== See also ==
- We Sing
- We Sing Encore
- SingStar
- Karaoke Revolution
- Lips
