= We Sing =

2009 video game

- Developer: Le Cortex
- Publisher: Nordic Games
- Producer: Wired Productions
- Engine: Unreal Engine 4 (Xbox One & PlayStation 4)
- Platforms: Wii; Xbox One; PlayStation 4
- Release: AU: November 12, 2009; EU: November 13, 2009
- Genre: Music video game
- Modes: Single-player, multiplayer

We Sing is a 2009 music video game for Wii, re-released in 2016 for Xbox One and PlayStation 4. It was developed by French studio Le Cortex, produced by Wired Productions and published by Nordic Games.

It is the first singing game to support 4 players simultaneously each with their own microphone.

The 2016 reboot of the game, supporting up to 10 singers We Sing is distributed as a software only version or a two microphone and game bundle pack.

== Gameplay ==
The gameplay is similar to the SingStar series of video games. Players sing along with music in order to score points, matching pitch and rhythm.

The game can be played with up to 4 people.

== Development and release ==
The launch event for the UK market for We Sing took place at the main Game store on Oxford Street London on 19 November 2009. It was promoted by The X Factor girl group Miss Frank.

In February 2016, Nordic Games, Wired Productions and Le Cortex established a new company for production of We Sing games.

== Sequels ==
There are 10 editions of the We Sing series released for the Nintendo Wii, including We Sing Encore. The game features 40 new songs, additional single and multiplayer modes, as well as an award system and singing lessons mode. On July 22, 2010, Nordic Games Publishing announced that a Robbie Williams edition of We Sing would be released, titled We Sing Robbie Williams. The game has 25 songs. It was released with Williams' greatest hits album in October 2010. Other titles include We Sing Down Under, We Sing Deutsche Hits, We Sing Deutsche Hits 2, We Sing UK Hits, We Sing Rock, We Sing Pop and We Sing 80s.

== See also ==
- SingStar
- Karaoke Revolution
- Lips
- Let's Sing
