= SpareMiNT =

Software distribution based on FreeMiNT

The SpareMiNT logo

SpareMiNT is a software distribution based on FreeMiNT, which consists of a MiNT-like operating system (OS) and kernel plus GEM compatible AES (Application Environment Services).

== Features and compatibility ==
The English language distribution is intended for the Atari ST and derivative m68k computers, clones and emulators, such as the FireBee project or Hatari and ARAnyM. The MiNT itself, also once called MultiTOS, provided an Atari TOS compatible OS replacement with multitasking and multi-user switching capabilities and Unix-like operation, all of which the original TOS lacked.

The distribution comes with Red Hat's RPM utility for managing the source and binary packages. Unix/Linux-style software can be used, if ported, GEM-programs for TOS can run concurrently. The TOS clone EmuTOS, instead of Atari's original, can be used as a base to boot a MiNT, and e.g. XaAES, a modern AES derivate, as an essential part of the GEM-GUI (Graphical user interface).

FreeMiNT, and therefore SpareMiNT, is basically the enhanced and greatly improved derivate, and can be used on today's computers, even on different hardware platforms via emulation or Virtual Machines, thanks to the flexibility of the original MiNT and its components that made further development possible.

== Comparable Distributions ==
=== EasyMiNT ===
Derived from SpareMiNT is EasyMiNT, using its software repository and a GEM based installer, providing a folder system similar to the UNIX Filesystem Hierarchy Standard and German language translations to programs.

=== AFROS ===
AFROS (Atari FRee Operating System) comes as a set of files, creating a TOS-compatible operating system; there exists a Live-CD to test. Its key components all consist of Free Software:

EmuTOS and FreeMiNT; fVDI (free Virtual Device Interface), clone of GEM's VDI; XaAES; TeraDesk (Tera Desktop), clone of the original Desktop Filemanager and "shell"

AFROS software is available to all Atari and/or TOS-compatible platforms, but is optimized to be used with the ARAnyM (Atari Running on Any Machine) emulator.

== Historical Distributions ==
Amongst other efforts, there also was a basic build of a Debian GNU/MiNT distribution, with a FreeMiNT kernel, GNU-based userland software plus DEB package management. It should have provided commonly used programs and was based on Debian GNU/Linux. Similar, more successful projects are Debian GNU/kFreeBSD, Debian GNU/Hurd and, most important, the Linux version. SpareMiNT follows the idea to use a Unix/Linux-like package management and software repository.

== See also ==
- Atari TOS
- EmuTOS
- MiNT
- Graphics Environment Manager
- XaAES
- TeraDesk
- AFROS
- GNU variants
