= Atari MEGA STE =

Personal computer by Atari

Atari Mega STE
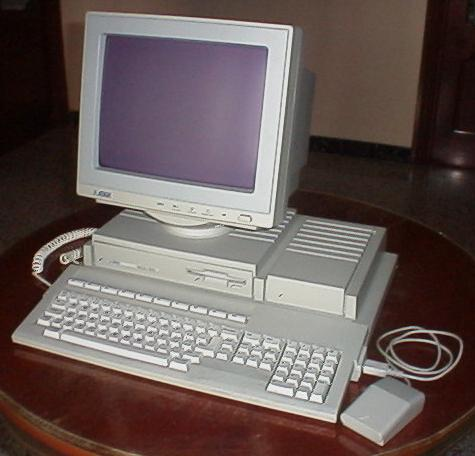
- Released: 1991; 35 years ago
- Introductory price: US$1,799 (equivalent to $4,250 in 2025)
- Operating system: Atari TOS
- CPU: Motorola 68000 @ 8 MHz or 16 MHz
- Memory: 1, 2 or 4 MB
- Display: 320×200 (16 of 4096 colors); 640×200 (4 of 4096 colors); 640×400 (mono)
- Graphics: BLiTTER
- Sound: Yamaha YM2149

The Atari Mega STE is Atari Corporation's final Motorola 68000-based personal computer in the Atari ST series and the second to last model overall. Released in 1991, the Mega STE is a late-model STE mounted in the case of an Atari TT computer. It was followed by the higher end Atari Falcon in 1992.

== Description ==
The MEGA STE is based on STE hardware. The 2 MB and 4 MB models shipped with a high-resolution mono monitor, and an internal SCSI hard disk (the 1 MB model includes neither a monitor, hard disk nor hard disk controller). While offering better ST compatibility than the TT, it also includes a number of TT features, from the ST-grey version of the TT case with a separate keyboard and system unit, optional FPU, a VMEbus slot, two extra RS232 ports (all 9-pin rather than 25-pin as previous models had), a LocalTalk/RS-422 port (no AppleTalk software was ever produced) and a 1.44 MB HD floppy support. Support for a third/middle mouse button is also included.

A unique feature of the MEGA STE in relation to previous Atari systems is the software-switchable CPU speed, which allows the CPU to operate at 16 MHz for faster processing or 8 MHz for better compatibility with old software. An upgrade to the operating system was also produced after the first units were shipped that upgraded the onboard ROMs to TOS 2.05 and later to 2.6/2.06.

The VME bus provides expansion capability using cards that enhance the computer's capabilities such as enhanced graphics processing capability and Ethernet network connectivity.

== Technical specifications ==
- CPU: Motorola 68000 @ 8 or 16 MHz with 16 KB cache
- FPU: Motorola 68881 or Motorola 68882
- BLiTTER - graphics co-processor chip
- RAM: 1, 2 or 4 MB ST RAM expandable to 4 MB using 30-pin SIMMs
- Sound: Yamaha YM2149 + enhanced sound chip same as in Atari STe
- Drive: 720 KB (first MEGA STE version) or 1.44 MB (later version) 3½" floppy disk drive
- Ports: MIDI In/Out, 3 x RS-232, "Serial LAN" LocalTalk/RS-422, printer, monitor (RGB and Mono), RF modulator, extra disk drive port, ACSI, SCSI (ACSI/SCSI daughterboard), port, VMEbus inside case, detachable keyboard, joystick and mouse ports on keyboard
- Operating system: TOS (The Operating System) with the Graphics Environment Manager (GEM) graphical user interface (GUI)
  - TOS versions: 2.05 or 2.06 in ROM
- Display modes: 320×200 (16 out of 4096 colors), 640×200 (4 out of 4096 colors), 640×400 (mono)
- Character set: Atari ST character set (based on code page 437)
- Case: Two-piece slim desktop-style.
