= Atari TT030 =

Personal computer by Atari

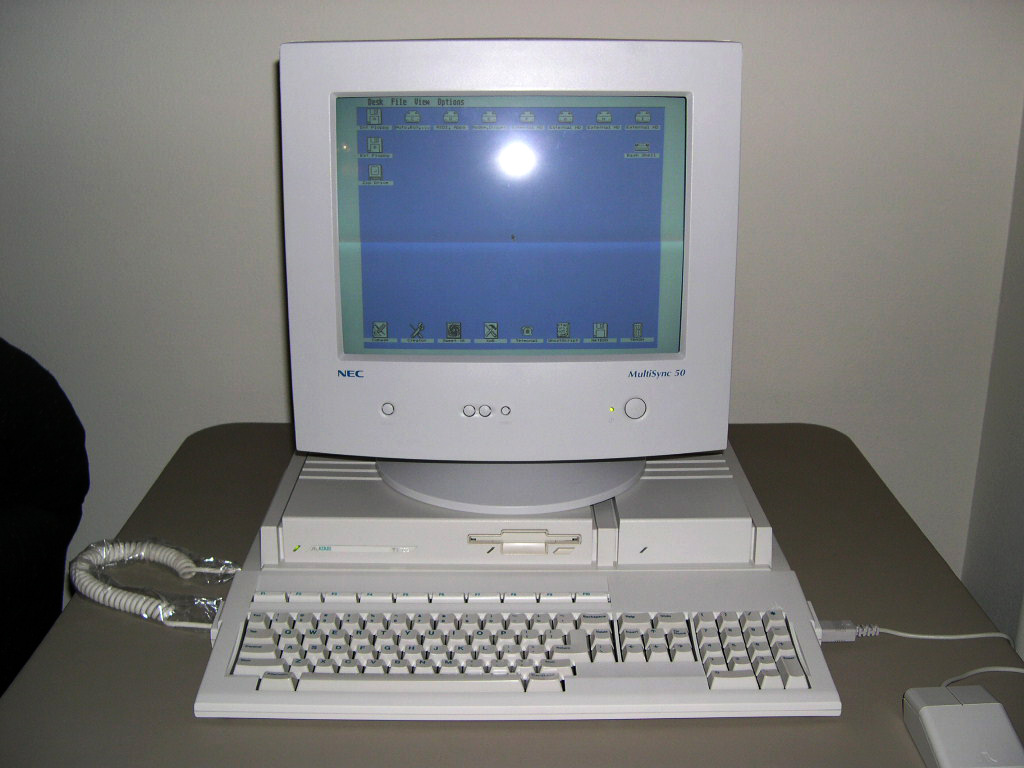
- Manufacturer: Atari Corporation
- Type: Personal computer
- Released: 1990; 36 years ago
- Introductory price: US$2,995 (approximately US$7,400 today)
- Discontinued: 1993; 33 years ago
- Operating system: Atari TOS 3.0x, ASV (Atari System V)
- CPU: CPU: Motorola 68030 @ 32 MHz (system bus @ 16 MHz); FPU: Motorola 68882 @ 32 MHz
- Memory: 2/16 MB
- Storage: 1.44 MB (later version) or 720 KB (first TT version) 3½" floppy disk drive 50 MB hard drive
- Display: VGA Monitor (analog RGB and Mono)
- Graphics: TT Shifter; Six Display modes Color: 320×200 (16 colors), 320×480 (256 colors), 640×200 (4 colors), 640×480 (16 colors), palette of 4096 colors Duochrome: 640×400 (2 colors); Monochrome: 1280×960 mono TT high with ECL 19 in (483 mm) monitor
- Sound: Yamaha YM2149 + Stereo 8-bit PCM via DMA, same as in the STe
- Input: Keyboard (detachable) 94 Key; 2 button Mouse
- Backward compatibility: Atari ST
- Predecessor: Atari MEGA STE
- Successor: Atari Falcon

The Atari TT030, more commonly known as the Atari TT, is a member of the Atari ST family, released in 1990. It was originally intended to be a high-end Unix workstation, but Atari took two years to release a port of Unix SVR4 for the TT, which prevented the TT from ever being seriously considered in its intended market.

In 1992, the TT was replaced by the Atari Falcon, a low-cost consumer-oriented machine with greatly improved graphics and sound capability, but with a slower and severely bottle-necked CPU. The Falcon possesses only a fraction of the TT's raw CPU performance. Though well priced for a workstation machine, the TT's high cost kept it mostly out of reach of the existing Atari ST market until after the TT was discontinued and sold at discount.

The nascent open source movement eventually filled the void. Thanks to open hardware documentation, the Atari TT, along with the Amiga and Atari Falcon, were the first non-Intel machines to have Linux ported to them. However it was not until after the TT had already been discontinued by Atari that this work resulted in stable versions of the kernel and the GNU userland software to enable a fully featured operating system and software development environment on the machine. By 1995, NetBSD had also been ported to the Atari TT.

== History ==
Atari Corporation realized that to remain competitive as a computer manufacturer, they needed to begin taking steps to exploit the power offered by more advanced processors in the Motorola 68000 series. At that time, the highest performance member was the 68020. It is the first true "thirty-two bit bus/thirty-two bit instruction" chip from Motorola. Unlike the 68000 used in the original STs, the 68020 is capable of fetching a 32-bit value in one memory cycle, while the older STs need two cycles.

The TT was initially designed around the 68020 CPU, but as the project progressed, Atari Corp. realized that the 68020 was not the best option for the TT. The 68020 still lacked some features offered by its successor in the 68000 line, the 68030, which featured built-in memory-management hardware, essential for running an acceptable Unix implementation.

When the decision was made to switch from a 68020 to a 68030 CPU, it presented a whole new set of problems. The original specifications for the TT's clock speed was 16 MHz, which was selected to maintain backward compatibility. The existing ST chips used in the TT (DMA and video chips for example) cannot handle anything over 16 MHz. Some software also has problems running at faster speeds. To make the system work with a 32 MHz 68030, Atari Corp. had to scale back their plans somewhat, and add a large amount of cache to the system. As a result, the processor runs at 32 MHz, while the system bus runs at 16 MHz. This is similar to the tactic employed by Apple with the ill-fated Macintosh IIvx and later employed by makers of PCs with an Intel 80486DX2 CPU which runs at double that of the system bus speed.

TOS 3.01 is the operating system that Atari bundled with the TT. It is a 512 KB ROM specifically designed for the TT. However, it does not feature pre-emptive multitasking. Another variant, known as TT/X, uses Unix System V R4 and WISH (Motif extension).

The TT030 was first introduced at CeBIT in Hannover, Germany and launched in 1990. It retailed for $2995 with 4 MB RAM and a 40 MB hard drive. The US release came the following year.

In 1993, Atari Corp.'s exit from the computer business marked the end of the TT, as well as the entire ST family. A number of TT machines were built as developer systems for the Jaguar.

== Details ==
The TT features a number of devices that had previously been unavailable for Atari Corp. systems. For example, an AppleTalk network port (there never was a driver for it, possibly due to license problems), VME expansion bus, new VGA video graphics modes, and a true SCSI port. Existing ST features such as MIDI ports, a cartridge port, and the ASCI/DMA port are retained in this system.

One device that is left out is the BLiTTER graphics chip, which first appeared in the Atari Mega ST systems four to five years earlier. Using the existing 8 MHz chip would have only served to bottleneck the TT's performance. To be useful, a new 32 MHz blitter chip would have had to have been designed for the TT, however Atari chose not to do so.

A developer system version of the TT was available, supplied with Atari System V (ASV), Atari's version of Unix System V Release 4, and the WISh2 windowing or graphical shell, a desktop environment running on OSF/Motif supplied by Non Standard Logics, as well as a collection of free software utilities including GCC. In the boot screen for Atari System V, the operating system's kernel identifies itself as "UniSoft UNIX (R) System V Release 4.0". To support application development, the Atari System V software distribution included a library, AtariLib, to facilitate compliance with the Atari Style Guide, along with XFaceMaker 2, a graphical user interface builder for OSF/Motif, intended to assist in porting GEM-based applications.

Initially, UniSoft UniPlus+ V Release 3.1 formed the basis of the Unix product on the TT. Having evolved to become a System V Release 3.2 product, Atari delayed the release of ASV to target the more recent System V Release 4. A developer release of ASV was made available in November 1991, but a final release of ASV was not ready until mid-1992. However, by the end of that year, Atari Corp. had dropped all Unix development. The final release was reportedly delivered to developers.

== Technical specifications ==
All TTs are made up of both custom and commercial chips:

- Custom chips
  - TT Shifter "TT Video shift register chip" — Enables bitmap graphics. Features a 64-bit wide bus with interleaved access to ("dual purpose") system memory and on-chip buffers for high bandwidths. Contiguous 32 KB memory for ST modes, 154 KB for TT modes.
  - TT GLU "Generalized Logic Unit" — Control logic for the system used to connect the STs chips. Not part of the data path, but needed to bridge chips with each other. Used in TT and MEGA STE.
  - DMA "Direct Memory Access" — Three independent channels, one for floppy and hard drive data transfers, one for the SCSI port and one for 85C30 SCC network port. Direct access to ("dual purpose") system memory in the ST. 2 chips used.
  - MCU "Memory Control Unit" — For system RAM.
- Support chips
  - MC6850P ACIA "Asynchronous Communications Interface Adapter" — Enables the ST to directly communicate with MIDI devices and keyboard (2 chips used). 31.25 kilobaud for MIDI, 7812.5 bit/s for keyboard.
  - MC68901 MFP "Multi Function Peripheral" — Used as an interrupt controller, timers and RS232C ports (2 chips used).
  - NCR 5380 "SCSI Controller" — 8-bit asynchronous transfers up to 4 MB/s.
  - WD-1772-PH "Western Digital Floppy Disk Controller" — Floppy controller chip.
  - Zilog 85C30 SCC "Zilog Serial Communications Controller" — Two high-speed SDLC serial ports.
  - YM2149F PSG "Programmable Sound Generator" — Provides 3-voice sound synthesis, also used for floppy signalling and printer port.
  - HD6301V1 "Hitachi keyboard processor" — Used for keyboard scanning and mouse/joystick ports.
  - MC146818A "Motorola Real Time Clock"
- CPU: Motorola 68030 @ 32 MHz (system bus @ 16 MHz)
- FPU: Motorola 68882 @ 32 MHz
- RAM:
  - System RAM ("dual purpose") 2 MB ST RAM expandable to 10 MB
  - TT RAM ("single purpose") expandable to 256 MB TT RAM on daughter board using either 30-pin or 72-pin SIMMs
- Sound: Yamaha YM2149 + Stereo DMA 8-bit PCM, same as in the STe
- Drive: 1.44 MB (later version) or 720 KB (first TT version) 3½" floppy disk drive
- Ports:
  - MIDI In/Out
  - 3 x RS-232
  - Serial LAN RS-422
  - Printer
  - VGA Monitor (analog RGB and Mono)
  - Extra Disk drive port
  - ACSI and SCSI port
  - VMEbus inside case
  - Cartridge (128 KB)
  - Keyboard (detachable)
    - Joystick and Mouse ports (on keyboard)
- Operating System:
  - Atari's TOS with the Graphics Environment Manager (GEM) graphical user interface (GUI) TOS versions: 3.01, 3.05 or 3.06 in ROM. Four socketed 1 Mb ROMs providing 512 KB of ROM space.
  - MiNT
  - MagiC
  - Atari System V
  - NetBSD
- Display modes:
  - Color: 320×200 (16 color), 320×480 (256 colors or 256 greyscales), 640×200 (4 colors), 640×480 (16 colors), palette of 4096 colors
  - Duochrome: 640×400 (2 colors)
  - Monochrome: 1280×960 mono TT high with ECL 19 in (483 mm) TTM195 monitor
- Character set: Atari ST character set, based on codepage 437.
- Case: Two-piece desktop-style.
- Release Date: 1990-1991

The (at least) two versions of the TT can be distinguished by:

- Internal sheet plate (old) or coating (new) for electromagnetic compatibility
- CPU and FPU on daughter board (old) or directly on main board (new)
- 1.44 MB HD floppy drive (720 KB DD floppy drive on older models)
- Some (very?) old models have 2 fans, on the rear left and right

== Emulation ==
- Hatari is able to emulate an Atari TT on a variety of different OS's using the SDL library.
- Atari Coldfire Project - Atari computer clone
