= Hatari =

Hatari may refer to:

- Hatari!, a 1962 American film directed by Howard Hawks and starring John Wayne
- Hatari (emulator), an Atari ST emulator
- Hatari (band), an Icelandic techno band that participated in the Eurovision Song Contest 2019
- Hatari (company), a Thai company that produces fans
