= XyWrite =

Word processor

- Original author: David Erickson
- Release: September 1982; 44 years ago
- Stable release: MS-DOS, 4.18 (1993); Windows, 4.13
- Operating system: MS-DOS, Windows
- Type: Word processor

XyWrite is a word processor for MS-DOS and Windows modeled on the mainframe-based ATEX typesetting system. Popular with writers and editors for its speed and degree of customization, XyWrite was in its heyday the house word processor in many editorial offices, including the New York Times from 1989 to 1993. XyWrite was developed by David Erickson and marketed by XyQuest from 1982 through 1992, after which it was acquired by The Technology Group. The final version for MS-DOS was 4.18 (1993); for Windows, 4.13.

== Features ==
- Its file format consists of plain text (IBM437, or so-called "extended ASCII") with markup (within guillemets: « »). This capability is useful for typesetters who need to convert to various formats, e.g., LaTeX. A plug-in for ANSI characters is available.
- XyWrite is written in assembly language, allowing it to run faster than word processors written in a higher level language.
- It has a flexible macro-programming language (XPL) that offers many advantages for quick search and replace, copy-editing and reformatting of raw text. Users continue to write and share macros extending XyWrite features (printing to USB devices, for example).
- Plain-text, editable configuration files allow easy customization of the keyboard—for remapping keystrokes and for execution of complex commands with individual keystrokes—as well as customization of what is loaded on launching the program.
- Commands can be typed in directly on a command line, without the use of a mouse. Commands are usually in simple English, such as "Save," "Print," and "Search," or their shorter versions, such as "Sa" for "Save" (commands are case-insensitive).
- Up to nine files can be opened for editing at one time in separate "windows" that allow quick copy-and-paste among several files. Two files may be opened on the same screen for easy comparison of changes; a XyWrite command will do the comparison automatically, putting the cursor on the location at which the two files first differ (from which the user can move to the next difference).
- Version 4 (or Signature) has full WYSIWYG graphical editing capabilities including on-screen display of bitmaps and Bitstream Speedo fonts.
- The Microsoft Windows version provided version 4 in a Windows environment, in WYSIWYG, without losing its command line driven interface. It supported the standard Windows' True Type fonts along with Speedo fonts.

== History and current usage ==
XyQuest was founded in June 1982 by former ATEX employees Dave Erickson and John Hild. Its most successful product was XyWrite III Plus, which attracted a devoted following among professional writers.

Announced in September 1989, XyWrite IV promised a lot to users, it entered beta-test after a year in November 1990 hoping to release by year end. By February 1991 it still hadn't shipped. The turning point for XyWrite came in the form of a disastrous near-partnership with IBM, which was seeking a modern replacement for its venerable DisplayWrite word processor. Working under an agreement signed in June 1990, XyQuest devoted nearly all of its development resources to revising Erickson's XyWrite IV to IBM's specifications, including IBM Common User Access-style menus, mouse support and a graphical user interface. Publicized in early 1991, the agreement envisioned as a marriage between XyQuest technology and IBM marketing, the product was to be called Signature, and would ship for MS-DOS, Microsoft Windows and IBM OS/2. DisplayWrite would be discontinued at the same time in favor of the new software.

But on the eve of Signature's release, IBM announced a strategic decision to withdraw completely from the desktop software market, shocking XyQuest and leaving Signature in limbo. When a prospective new alliance with Lotus did not materialize, XyQuest regained the marketing rights to the software and restickered the ready-to-ship Signature packages pasting over the IBM logo. Following mixed reviews and poor performance, it was later improved and renamed as XyWrite 4.0.

However, the changes IBM had insisted on were a liability where the III Plus user base was concerned. Some key reviews (such as in The Wall Street Journal) were harsh, and there were complaints that 4.0 was buggy and slow. Moreover, in the years since the last major XyWrite release, WordPerfect had cemented its hold on the DOS word processor market. Already financially strained by the long development cycle for Signature, by the end of 1992 XyQuest was bleeding money. The sale to The Technology Group ensued.

While there were a few maintenance releases of 4.0 after the acquisition, The Technology Group's major commitment was to developing XyWrite for Windows. But XyWrite remained a niche product, unable to compete for the business user against Word for Windows, WordPerfect for Windows, and Ami Pro, despite added versatility and customization potential. The Technology Group was dissolved in 2003.

Several versions of XyWrite were also localized for use in European countries. For example, the programs were offered in Germany under the name "euroscript" by North American Software GmbH.

=== Nota Bene ===
A descendant of XyWrite called Nota Bene is still being actively developed. Nota Bene, which runs on the XyWrite engine, is popular among academics. As of November 2026, Nota Bene for Windows and Mac is at version 15. NotaBene is supported on native Windows, Mac and on Linux running WINE.

=== Current usage ===
In 2015, work started on using XyWrite within the vDos program shell in 32 and 64 bit windows. This was successful in October 2016, resulting in an x86 PC and DOS emulator for Windows based on Jos Schaars's vDos. Formerly known as vDos-lfn, vDosPlus allows XyWrite 4, XyWrite III+, and Nota Bene for DOS to run under the latest versions of Microsoft Windows (including 64-bit Windows). VdosPlus.org shows the various functions, and XyWWWeb shows usage.

XyWrite does not have as many features as Word or OpenOffice.org. For example, XyWrite is unaware of Windows ANSI or Unicode character sets and Nota Bene does not support languages (such as Chinese) that require double-byte characters.

== Reception ==
Byte in 1984 stated "the XyQuest people have done an admirable job porting the editing part of the Atex system" to the IBM PC. While criticizing the documentation, it called XyWrite "extremely fast, powerful, compact, and flexible". The magazine reported in 1988 that XyWrite III Plus, "one of the most ill-behaved PC programs in existence", ran without problems on a Macintosh with SoftPC.

Stating in The Yale Review that they were "not at all the best known", Edward Mendelson in 1985 recommended XyWrite II+ 1.5 and Nota Bene 1.0 as among the three best word processors for "journalists, essayists, and scholars, novelists, dramatists, and poets". Despite "serious flaws [and] special varieties of annoyance and illogic", he said that they "are each far superior to anything else available". Mendelson also praised XyWrite III 3.04 and Nota Bene 2.0 in 1986, describing the former as "the only word-processing program that lets you work as quickly as you think", and the latter "as a tool for scholarly writing and editing [it] has no competition".

"The one unforgivable sin for a text editor is losing text. XyWrite managed to do that the other day", Jerry Pournelle of BYTE reported in March 1986. He added, however, that "XyWrite III fixes many bugs, including this one".

== Version history ==
=== MS-DOS ===
- XyWrite I
- XyWrite II
- XyWrite II Plus
- XyWrite III, - distributed on 5.25" HD floppy diskettes, and shipped with a 3-ring looseleaf manual in fabric-covered slipcase
- XyWrite III Plus
- Signature 1.0 - initially announced September 1989 as XyWrite 4.0.
- XyWrite 4.0 - Jan 1993 - distributed on seven 3.5" HD floppy diskettes, and shipped with five bound manuals: Installation & Learning Guide, Making the Transition, Customization Guide, Command Reference Guide, and LAN Administrator's Guide (together weighing nearly 4.5 pounds)

=== Windows ===
- XyWrite for Windows - Aug 1993

== See also ==
- Bitstream Speedo Fonts
- List of word processors
