= Atari Coldfire Project =

- Developer: Firebee Volunteers
- Released: May 2012; 13 years ago
- Introductory price: 599 Euros
- Website: www.firebee.org

The Atari Coldfire Project (ACP) is a volunteer project that has created a modern Atari ST computer clone called the FireBee.

== Reason for the project ==
A new clone named Phenix never made it to market in final form.

== Specifications ==
The specifications for the ACP have changed considerably over time, in response to advancing technology and price considerations. However, it seems the following will be in the final design according to former Atari Coldfire Project homepage:

- Processor: Coldfire MCF5474, 264 MHz, 400 MIPS
- RAM: DDR, 512 MB Main- + 128 MB Video- and Special-RAM on Board, Speed: 1 Gbit/s
- Flash: 8 MB onboard for operating systems
- Atari compatible interface ports:
  - TT/Falcon-IDE,
  - ST/TT-Floppy
  - TT-SCSI (but faster)
  - ACSI
  - ROM-Port: 2×2 mm Connector
  - Printer Port, parallel
  - ST/TT-serial
  - MIDI
  - ST-Sound, YM2149 over AC'97
  - ST/TT/Falcon-Video
  - Atari-Keyboard with Mouse
- Other Ports:
  - Ethernet 10/100, 1 Port
  - USB 2.0 Host (ISP1563), 5 Ports
  - Compact-Flash, 1 Port
  - SD-Card, 1 Port
  - AC'97 Stereo Codec with DMA-Sound Output and 48 kHz Sampling Input
  - Sound_Connectors: LineIn, LineOut, Mic (Mono), DVD/CD internal
  - New Video Modes about 2 megapixels, true color
  - PS2 Mouse/Keyboard Port
- Battery Powered (if desired)
- PCI 33 MHz direct Edge for passive backplane
- Power controller with real time clock, PIC18F4520
- Extension socket: 60Pol (DSPI 33 megabaud, serial sync or async about 33 megabaud, 26 bit I/O about 133 MHz, I^{2}C-Bus)
- Asynchronous 512 KB static RAM for DSP or similar already planned extensions in the future: Falcon DSP in the FPGA
- Format: Card (90 × 260 × 20 mm (4 × 10 × 1 in.))
- Power consumption of the complete board: 3 to 5 watts

== Operating systems ==
On the 8 MB ROM, FireBee devices have the following pre-installed software:

- BaS (BasicSystem)
- FPGA config
- FireTOS
- EmuTOS

There's a ready to use FreeMiNT and GUI environment setup with applications ported to work on ColdFire which can be ordered on CompactFlash card with the device.

μClinux has also been ported to FireBee.

== Compatibility ==
There are different strategies for dealing with the differences in ColdFire and 68K instruction set and opcodes:

- FireTOS includes 68K emulation based on an illegal instruction exception handler and CF68KLib
- 68Kemu program (based on Musashi 68k emulator) can be used to run 68K programs with EmuTOS
- Most of the operating system and basic desktop software has been ported and built for ColdFire and rest is able to run with emulation
- Several commercial and shareware Atari SW packages have also either been ported to ColdFire or open sourced so that they could be ported to FireBee

FireBee FPGA doesn't yet provide DSP functionality which means that any Atari Falcon specific programs requiring DSP won't run. Many Falcon games and demos use it to play background music.

== Development tool support ==
- GCC, VBCC and (Pure C compatible) AHCC C-compilers and their libraries have fully working ColdFire support
- Digger disassembler supports ColdFire
- RSC-editors like ResourceMaster work on Firebee
- GFA Basic has been modified to support FireTOS
- SDL library and its (Atari specific) LDG dependency are ported to ColdFire/FireBee
