= Motorola 68881 =

Computer floating-point unit

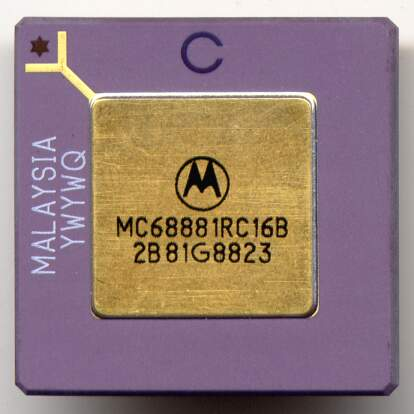
Motorola 68881 FPU

The Motorola 68881 and Motorola 68882 are floating-point units (FPUs) used in some computer systems in conjunction with Motorola's 32-bit 68020 or 68030 microprocessors. These coprocessors are external chips, designed before floating point math became standard on CPUs. The Motorola 68881 was introduced in 1984. The 68882 is a higher performance version produced later.

== Overview ==
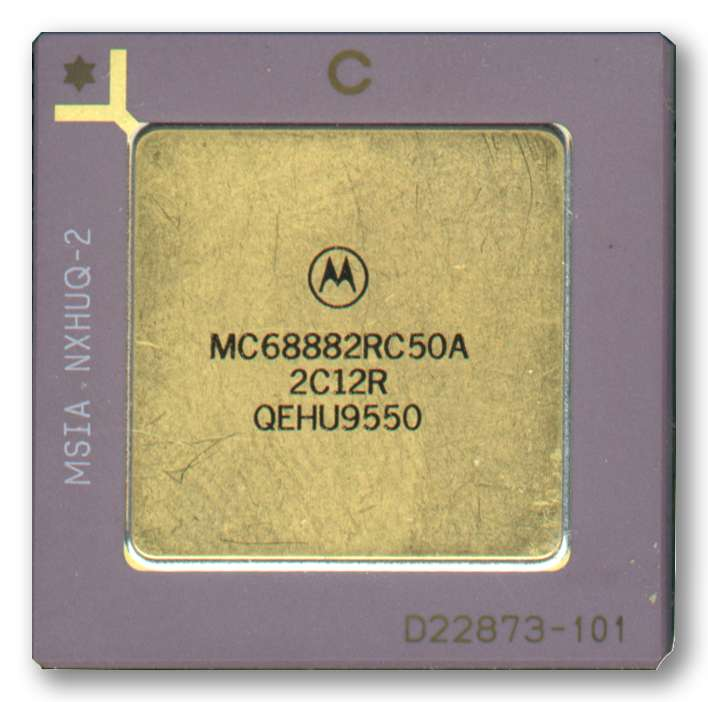
A Motorola 68882 FPU

The 68020 and 68030 CPUs were designed with the separate 68881 chip in mind. Their instruction sets reserved the "F-line" instructions – that is, all opcodes beginning with the hexadecimal digit "F" could either be forwarded to an external coprocessor or be used as "traps" which would throw an exception, handing control to the computer's operating system. If an FPU is not present in the system, the OS would then either call an FPU emulator to execute the instruction's equivalent using 68020 integer-based software code, return an error to the program, terminate the program, or crash and require a reboot.

== Architecture ==
Motorola 68881/68882 series registers
^{7}_{9}	...	^{6}_{3}	...	^{0}_{0}	(bit position)
Floating point registers
±	exponent		mantissa			FP0
±	exponent		mantissa			FP1
±	exponent		mantissa			FP2
±	exponent		mantissa			FP3
±	exponent		mantissa			FP4
±	exponent		mantissa			FP5
±	exponent		mantissa			FP6
±	exponent		mantissa			FP7
^{3}_{1}	...	^{2}_{3}	...	^{1}_{5}	...	^{0}_{7}	...	^{0}_{0}	(bit position)
Control register
0		0		Exception Enable		Mode Control		FPCR
Status register
Condition		Quotient		Exception Status		Accrued Exception		FPSR
Instruction address register
32 Bit Address								FPIAR

The 68881 has eight 80-bit data registers (a 64-bit mantissa plus a sign bit, and a 15-bit signed exponent). It allows seven different modes of numeric representation, including single-precision floating point, double-precision floating point, extended-precision floating point, integers as 8-, 16- and 32-bit quantities and a floating-point Binary-coded decimal format. The binary floating point formats are as defined by the IEEE 754 floating-point standard. It was designed specifically for floating-point math and is not a general-purpose CPU. For example, when an instruction requires any address calculations, the main CPU handles them before the 68881 takes control.

The CPU/FPU pair are designed such that both can run at the same time. When the CPU encounters a 68881 instruction, it hands the FPU all operands needed for that instruction, and then the FPU releases the CPU to go on and execute the next instruction.

== 68882 ==
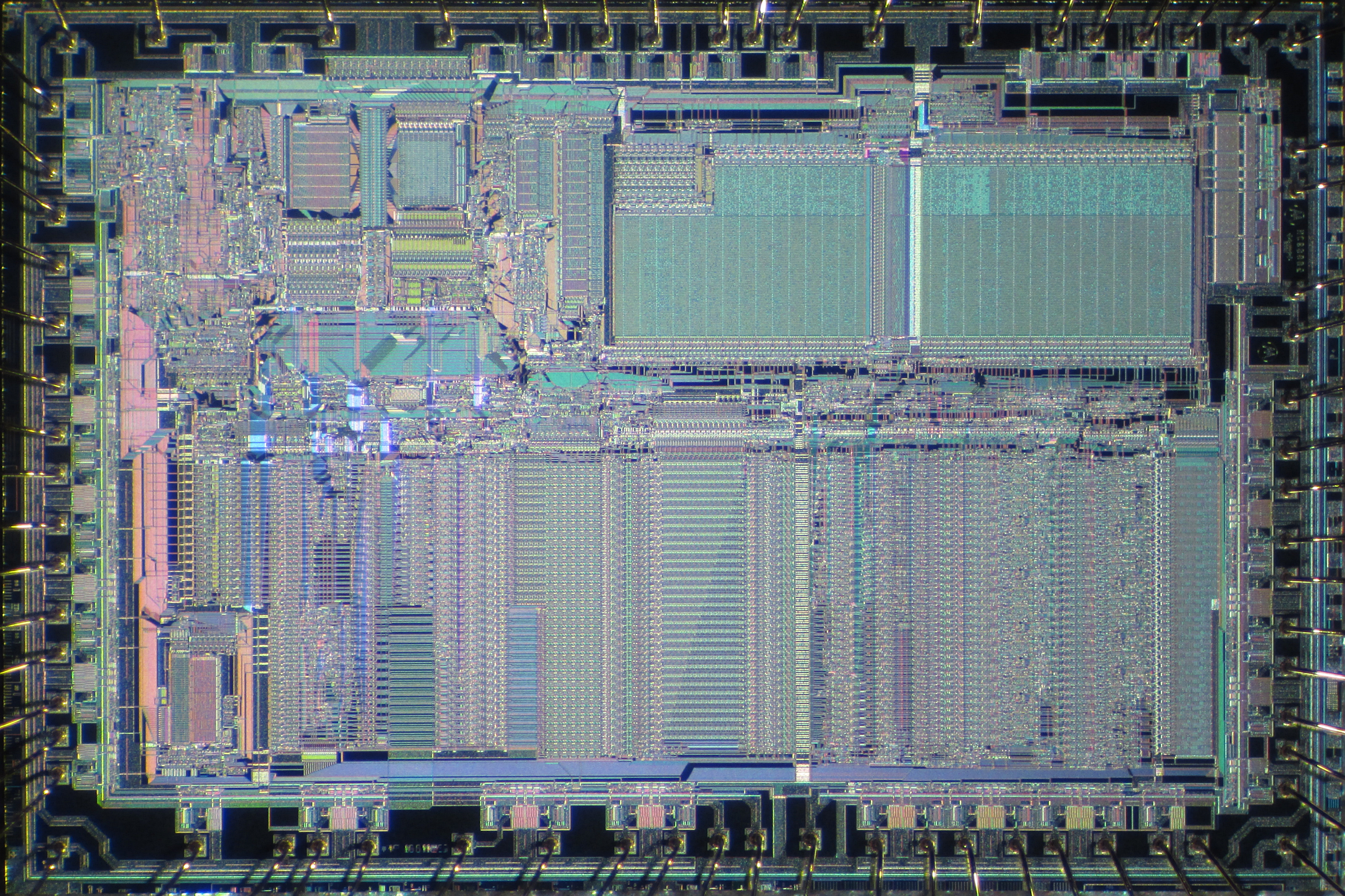
Die of Motorola 68882

The 68882 is an improved version of the 68881, with better pipelining, and eventually available at higher clock speeds. Its instruction set is exactly the same. Motorola claimed in some marketing literature that it executes some instructions 40% faster than a 68881 at the same clock speed; the typical performance improvement is more modest.

The 68882 is pin compatible with the 68881 and can be used as a direct replacement in most systems. The most important software incompatibility is that the 68882 uses a larger FSAVE state frame, which affects UNIX and other preemptive multitasking OSes that had to be modified to allocate more space for it.

== Usage ==
The 68881 or 68882 were used in the Sun Microsystems Sun-3 workstations, IBM RT PC workstations, Macintosh II family, NeXT Computer, X68000, Amiga 3000, Convergent Technologies MightyFrame, Atari Mega STE, TT, and Falcon. Some third-party Amiga and Atari products, including the CMI PAMC-500, used the 68881 or 68882 as a memory-mapped peripheral to the 68000.

== Versions ==
=== 68881 ===
- 155,000 transistors on-chip
- 12 MHz version
- 16 MHz version ran at 160 kFLOPS
- 20 MHz version ran at 192 kFLOPS
- 25 MHz version ran at 240 kFLOPS

=== 68882 ===
- 176,000 transistors on-chip
- 25 MHz version ran at 264 kFLOPS
- 33 MHz version ran at 352 kFLOPS
- 40 MHz version ran at 422 kFLOPS
- 50 MHz version ran at 528 kFLOPS

These statistics came from the comp.sys.m68k FAQ. No statistics are listed for the 16 MHz and 20 MHz 68882, though these chips were indeed produced.

== Legacy ==
Starting with the Motorola 68040, floating point support was included in the CPU itself.
