= Nota Bene (word processor) =

Word processor

- Developer: Nota Bene (formerly Dragonfly Software)
- Release: 1982; 44 years ago
- Stable release: Nota Bene Workstation 15 / June 2026 June 2026; 5 months ago
- Operating system: Windows 7/10/11, MacOS 10.13+
- Platform: x86-64, Apple M1/Apple M1/M2/M3
- Type: Word processor
- Website: https://www.notabene.com/

Nota Bene is an integrated software suite of applications, including word processing, reference management, and document text analysis software that is focused on writers and scholars in the Humanities, Social Sciences, and the Arts. The integrated suite is referred to as the Nota Bene Workstation. It runs on Microsoft Windows and Macintosh.

Nota Bene Workstation’s basic components are:

- Nota Bene, the word-processing application
- Ibidem, the citation and bibliography manager application
- Ibid Plus, the non-bibliographic database manager application
- Orbis, the text retrieval application.

Additional components can be added to extend the capabilities of the basic suite, including Lingua, Orbis +, and Archiva, among others [see below].

The Nota Bene Workstation is designed for the research and writing requirements of advanced students and scholars.

== History ==
Nota Bene (NB) began as an MS-DOS program in 1982, built on the engine of the word processor XyWrite. Its creator, Steven Siebert, then a doctoral student in philosophy and religious studies at Yale, used a PC to take reading notes, but had no easy computer-based mechanism for searching through them, or for finding relationships and connections in the material. He wanted a word processor with an integrated "textbase" to automate finding text with Boolean searches, and an integrated bibliographical database that would automate the process of entering repeat citations correctly, and be easy to change for submission to publishers with different style-manual requirements.

Siebert licensed XyWrite code from the XyQuest company, and built his programs on it: the word processor Nota Bene, with its text-centric database application, Orbis (then called Textbase), and its bibliographical database Ibidem (then called Ibid). He founded Dragonfly Software to market it. He first showed Nota Bene at the MLA convention of December 1982. Version 1 is dated 1983, and version 2, 1986. Version 3.0 came out in 1988, version 4.0 in 1992, and version 4.5 in 1995. Version 4.5 was the last NB DOS version.

Nota Bene 3.0 was selected as PC Editor’s Choice by PC Magazine in 1988.

Nota Bene 5.0 was the first Windows version. It was shown in pre-release in November 1998, at the annual meetings of the American Academy of Religion and the Society of Biblical Literature. Scholar's Workstation 5.0 was formally released in 1999, and Lingua Workstation 5.0 in 2000. Nota Bene for Windows suite retained and refined Ibidem, Orbis, and the XyWrite-based programming language XPL.

New versions are updated with some regularity. After version 5 was launched under the Windows platform, version 6.0 appeared in 2002, version 7.0 in 2003, version 8.0 in 2006, version 9.0 in 2010. A major upgrade came with version 10, which was released in September 2014 as a 32-bit application; thereafter, version 11.5 was released in June 2016, version 12 in April 2018, and version 13 in August 2021. Version 15 was released in June 2026.

== Program Appeal ==
Nota Bene Workstation’s appeal among academic users is derived from integrated tools that are specifically tailored to address the distinctive and complex needs involved in research, academic writing, manuscript preparation and publishing.

Central among these tools is the incorporation of the major academic manuals of style, including the Chicago Manual of Style, the style of the American Psychological Association, the Modern Language Association Manual of Style, the Society of Biblical Literature Handbook of Style, and the Turabian Manual for Writers. In addition, the program includes several styles required by graduate schools for Master’s theses and doctoral dissertations, including the University of Chicago Dissertation Style, among others. Once implemented at the point of creating a document, each style governs all the formatting rules across the document (e.g., heads, body text regions, block quotations, etc.), including citations and bibliographies. Implementation of an academic style means that the submission of manuscript to journals and book publishers will conform to editors’ requirements, and that camera-ready documents can be more easily constructed.

Other features designed for academic use is the program’s extensive capabilities in the use of non-Western and ancient languages. These capabilities are made possible by the integration of “Lingua”, an optional module. Every language feature is implemented across all applications in the suite.

The Lingua enabled Workstation integrates non-Western languages into the NB word processor, Orbis and Ibidem, including Hebrew, Cyrillic and Greek, Arabic, Persian (Farsi) and Urdu, along with the International Phonetic Alphabet. Additional Lingua modules extend language capabilities to include Coptic, Syriac, Ugaritic and Akkadian.

All user-enabled languages can be mixed in the same document. Lingua presents strong multi-language support, including entry of over 1,700 different characters; over 230 accents; breathing marks, diacritics, vowels and cantillations, in virtually any combination; conjectural characters, three levels of superscript and subscript, and multilingual case conversion. The program’s font-rendering table enables accurate placement of marks for printing.

Because academic research and writing normally involves access to multiple files, the Nota Bene Workstation can have up to 36 files open at once within the same NB window. By default, the Workstation operates as a Multi-Document Interface (MDI); with version 13, users can also open multiple instances of the program as Single-Document Interface (SDI). All open documents can be saved with one keystroke, along with a feature (Log and Resume) that logs all selected open documents at program shutdown, then, when re-opened, all logged documents will be positioned with the same status at the point when they were closed. Multiple groups of files can be logged for work on different projects.

Otherwise, the Nota Bene Workstation word processor includes the usual features of similar contemporary products, such as templates, spell-checking, change-tracking, outlining and hyperlinking. In addition, it provides three independent sets of footnotes/endnotes, the capacity to insert boilerplate from phrase libraries, the means of generating indexes, tables of contents and cross-references, and tools designed to handle book-length manuscripts

Documents are saved with the default .nb extension or with a user-designated extension. Files are imported from, and exported to, most major word-processing programs using the Rich Text Format (RTF). Files may also be saved in PDF format, which is especially useful when preparing style-based camera-ready documents.

== The keyboard ==
Nota Bene has a large number of built-in keyboard shortcuts. Most commands can be entered in several ways, using a mouse, menus, toolbars, the command line, or keystroke combinations. The keyboard is fully customizable: users can modify virtually all alphanumeric and function keys, using the Ctrl, Alt, and ⇧ Shift modifiers in over 450 key combinations.

== Codes view and XPL programming ==
In addition to employing Microsoft Windows' Graphical User Interface, the Nota Bene word processor provides for viewing and editing all the formatting commands used in a given document. Access to commands is available through its Show Codes View along with its Draft View which, additionally, provides editing guidance and information for each command. Nota Bene also provides for a programming language, XPL, to write simple macros and complex programs. Guidance regarding keyboard customization and user programming is available on the NB website.

== The user list ==
The Nota Bene user support group has existed since 1986, and was among the earliest of such groups. Currently, a Nota Bene users’ discussion group is provided through H-Net-Commons, part of H-Net, the Humanities and Social Sciences Online organization, hosted by Michigan State University. The discussion group is found at NOTABENE@lists.h-net.org.

== Word Processor’s Strengths and Limitations ==
The strengths of the Nota Bene word processor are speed, flexibility, customization, and handling of book-length manuscripts. Its special strengths are derived from the integration with Ibidem, the bibliographic database and Orbis, the text-centric database used for indexing, searching and retrieving documents. All applications share a common interface.

The program has certain limitations. It is not well suited to collaborative projects, since it has no group-editing utility. Although NB documents can readily be converted into and out of Microsoft Word and other formats, it likely requires that step in order to collaborate with others who are likely to use Microsoft Word. Conversions involving non-Roman alphabets can require special attention.

== Orbis ==
Nota Bene refers to Orbis as a "textbase," that is, a database management program dedicated to text-based content analysis. It is a free-form text-retrieval system accessible from within any of the suite’s component applications. Its purpose is to retrieve information from texts using straight-line searches or complex Boolean connector searches. Retrieved data can be viewed, saved, or incorporated into other documents. Orbis+, the optional module, extends the indexing and searching capabilities beyond Nota Bene files to files in other popular formats, including PDF, DOCX, DOC, RTF and saved HTML.

Orbis can search over 8 million indexed files. Search matches are shown in user-selected linguistic units: sentences, paragraphs (the default), and entire documents. Keywords within the retrieve text is highlighted. Retrieved text from a document that was linked to a bibliographic record in the user's Ibidem database will be used to open the bibliographic record for additional exploration. Orbis search matches can be inserted into a user’s document. If citations are included in the copied data, they will be automatically formatted to conform to the style used in the receiving document.

Orbis can perform concept-based searches, used to expand the text analysis. For instance, a user can have a synonym list that associates the head code "authoritarian" with other related codes such as "caudillo" "strongman" and "dictatorship." Thus, a search for "authoritarian" will also find data containing any of those associated terms.

Orbis comes with dedicated templates suitable for interviews, and for searching English, Greek and Hebrew Biblical texts. It can be used to analyze congressional or parliamentary debates; lawyers use it to scrutinize case law.

== Ibidem ==
Ibidem is NB’s bibliographic database and citation management application. It is equipped with the citation and bibliographic rules of over 500 journals and professional associations. Ibidem citations will conform to the academic style designated for the document. Citations will automatically populate the document’s Bibliography/Works Cited section, if desired. In the event a document’s style is changed, Nota Bene Workstation will change the document’s formatting comprehensively, including the citation apparatus to suit the new style.

Ibidem and Orbis can be hypertextually linked to each other and to NB or non-NB documents. Users can take notes in note-taking files created by Ibidem. Citations in note-taking files that are copied to other files will be automatically re-formatted. Orbis keywords are used to tag sections of note-taking files for subsequent search and analysis.

The Nota Bene Workstation also includes Ibid Plus, a user-customized, non-bibliographical database management application. However, Ibid Plus does not have spreadsheet functions.

== Archiva ==
Archiva, an optional module, is an always-on Web trawler. Archiva’s retrieval of on-line bibliographic data are transferred to the user’s Ibidem database. Archiva’s tools include a z39.50 client used to search on-line catalogues of university libraries and research centers world wide. Also included are tools to convert typed or scanned ISBN numbers into bibliographic records. Archiva harvests bibliographic data from on-line journal aggregators such as JSTOR and Project Muse. The last tool converts formatted bibliographies into individual Ibidem records.
