= MiNT =

Alternative operating system kernel for Atari ST

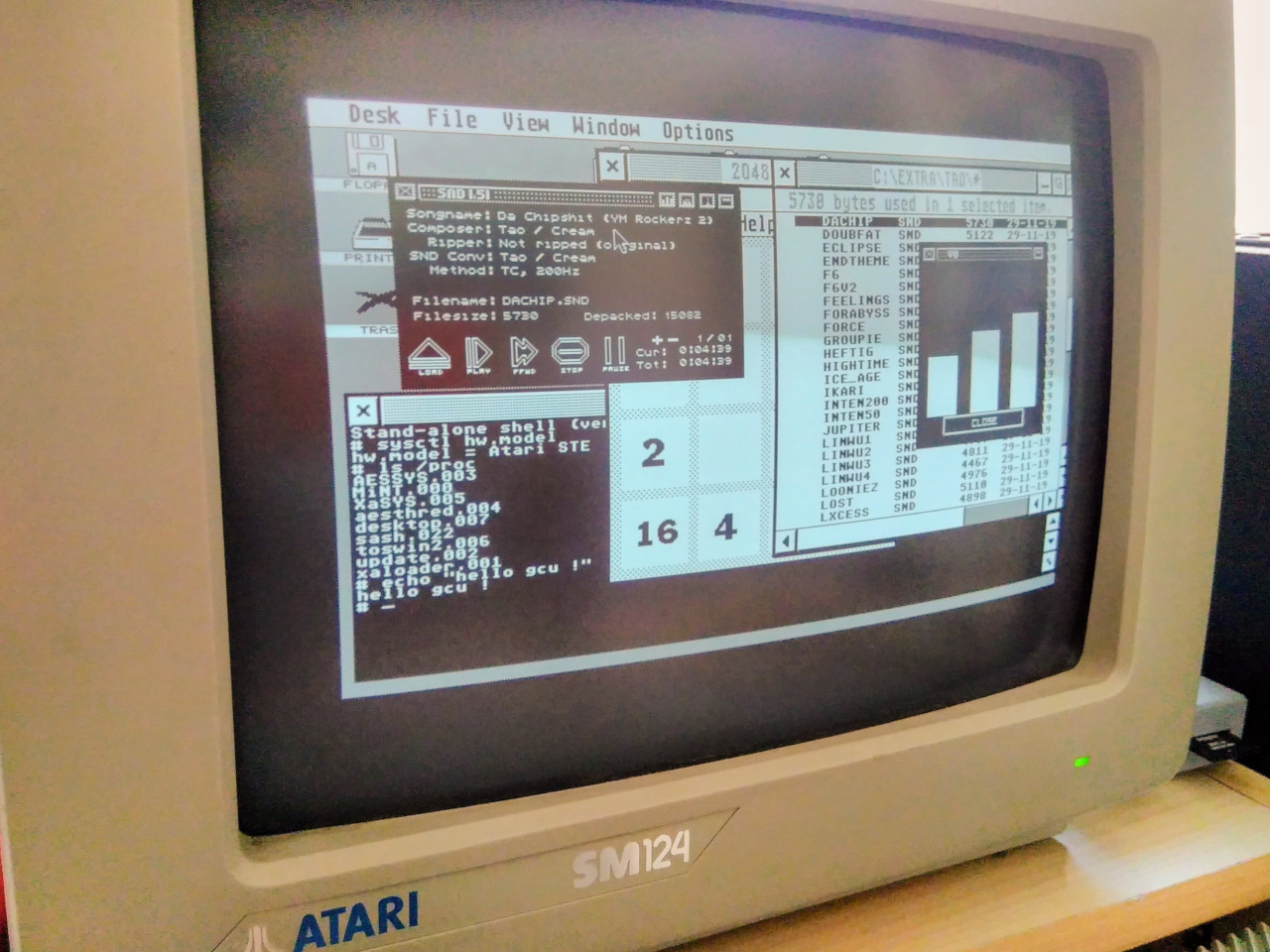
- FreeMiNT 1.19 beta on Atari STE
- Developer: Eric Smith, various volunteers
- Written in: C
- Working state: Current
- Source model: Open source
- Initial release: June 1993; 32 years ago
- Latest release: 1.18.0 / 17 March 2013
- Repository: github.com/freemint/freemint
- Marketing target: Personal computers
- Platforms: Atari ST, Firebee, ARAnyM, Amiga
- Kernel type: Monolithic
- Influenced by: Atari TOS
- Default user interface: GEM
- License: Various, including GNU General Public License (Free Software)
- Official website: freemint.github.io

MiNT (MiNT is Now TOS) is a free software alternative operating system kernel for the Atari ST series. It offers a partially preemptive, multi-tasking alternative to TOS and MagiC, with some memory protection. Together with the free system components fVDI device drivers, XaAES graphical user interface widgets, and TeraDesk file manager, MiNT provides a free TOS compatible replacement OS that can multitask a subset of the Atari ST applications.

== History ==
Work on MiNT began in 1989, as the developer Eric Smith was trying to port the GNU library and related utilities on the Atari ST TOS. It soon became much easier to add a Unix-like layer to the TOS, than to patch all of the GNU software, and MiNT began as a TOS extension to help in porting.

MiNT was originally released by Eric Smith as "MiNT is Not TOS" (a recursive acronym in the style of "GNU's Not Unix") in May 1990. The new Kernel got traction, with people contributing a port of the MINIX file system and a port to the Atari TT.

At the same time, Atari was looking to enhance the TOS with multitasking abilities. MiNT could fulfill the job, and Atari hired Eric Smith. MiNT was adopted as an official alternative kernel with the release of the Atari Falcon, slightly altering the MiNT acronym into "MiNT is Now TOS". Atari bundled MiNT with a multitasking version of the Graphics Environment Manager (GEM) under the name MultiTOS as a floppy disk based installer.

After Atari left the computer market, MiNT development continued as FreeMiNT, and became maintained by a team of volunteers. FreeMiNT development follows a classic open-source approach, with the source code hosted on a publicly browsable FreeMiNT Git repository on GitHub and development discussed in a public mailing list, which is maintained on SourceForge, after an earlier (2014) move from AtariForge, where it was maintained for almost 20 years.

== MiNT software ecosystem ==
FreeMiNT provides only a kernel, so several distributions support MiNT, like VanillaMint, EasyMint, STMint, and BeeKey/BeePi.

Although FreeMiNT can use the graphical user interface of the TOS (the Graphics Environment Manager GEM and the Application Environment Services or AES), it is better served with an enhanced AES which can use its multi-tasking abilities.

The default one is currently XaAES, which is developed as a FreeMiNT kernel module. The older N.AES also works, however the modern alternative is MyAES.
