= Hatari (emulator) =

Atari computer emulator

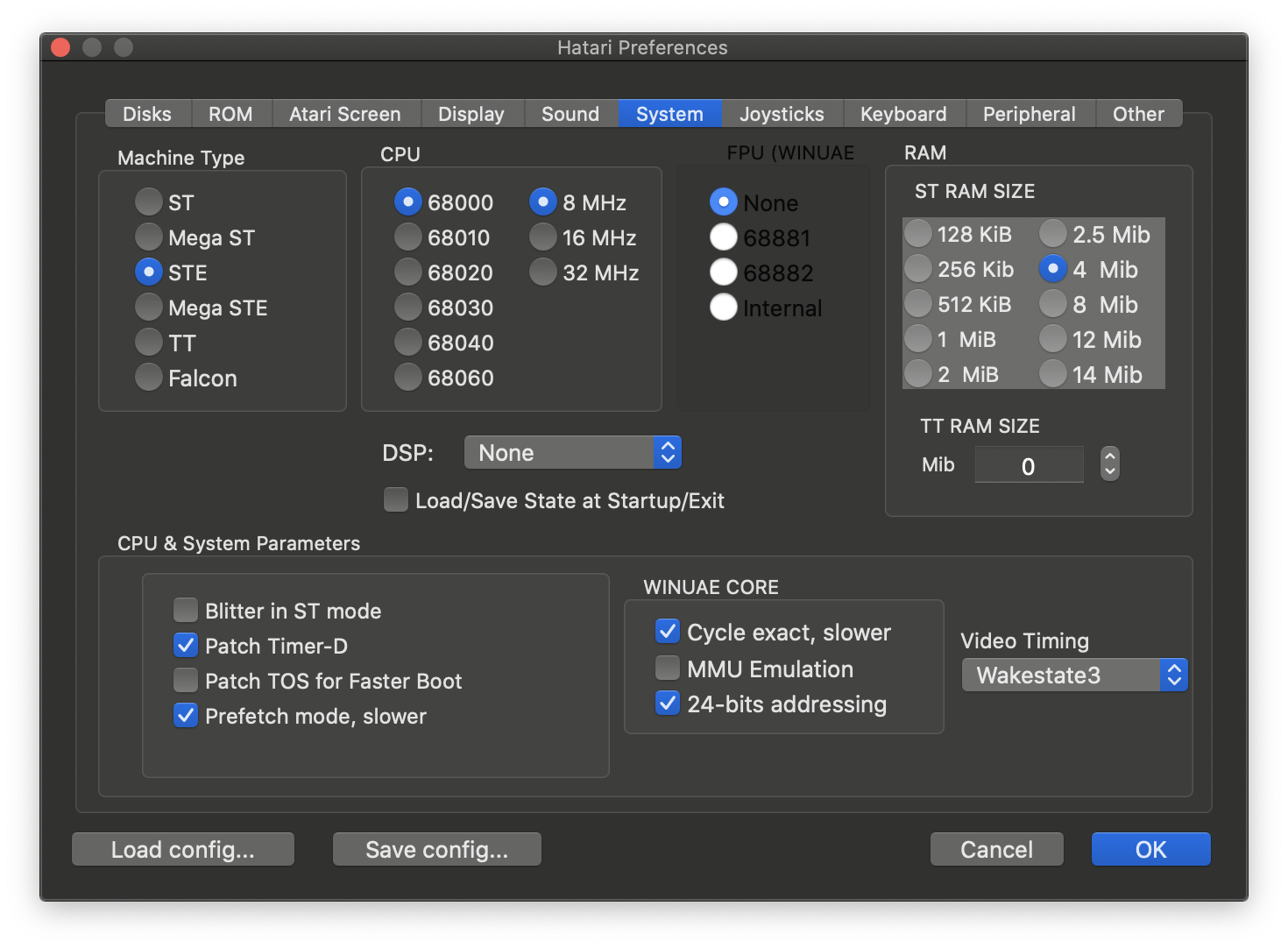
- Hatari's system settings
- Original author: Thomas Huth
- Developers: Nicolas Pomarède, Eero Tamminen, others
- Initial release: 30 May 2001; 24 years ago
- Stable release: 2.6.1 / 15 August 2025; 2 months ago
- Repository: framagit.org/hatari/hatari
- Written in: C
- Operating system: POSIX (Linux, BSD, macOS, other Unix-like), AmigaOS 4, AROS, MorphOS, Windows, BeOS, AmigaOS
- Available in: C
- Type: Emulator
- License: GNU General Public License (free software)
- Website: hatari.tuxfamily.org

Hatari is an open-source emulator of the Atari ST 16/32-bit computer system family. It emulates the Atari ST, Atari STe, Atari TT, and Atari Falcon computer series and some corresponding peripheral hardware like joysticks, mouse, midi, printer, serial and floppy and hard disks. It supports more graphics modes than the ST and does not require an original TOS image as it supports EmuTOS. The latest version has no reported issues with the ST/STe/TT applications emulation compatibility and also most of the ST/STe games and demos work without issues.

== Development ==
Hatari uses source code from several other emulators: WinSTon (Atari ST peripherals), UAE (Motorola 680x0 CPU), WinUAE (more accurate Motorola 68030 CPU + MMU), STonX (BLiTTER), ARAnyM (Motorola 56001 DSP, Videl, NVRAM).

Hatari uses the SDL library for graphics, is developed on Linux and has been ported to many OSes such as AmigaOS 4, AROS, BSD, BeOS, RISC OS, MorphOS, macOS, AmigaOS, Windows.
