= Bitstream Speedo Fonts =

Obsolete scalable font format

Bitstream Speedo, or Speedo, is an obsolete scalable font format created by Bitstream Inc. Speedo was used on Atari ST, Falcon, in the XyWrite word processor, and in very early versions of WordPerfect and Microsoft Windows. Speedo was replaced by more popular font types like Type 1 fonts. Before Speedo was considered obsolete it was supported by the X Window System through the speedo module, and most Linux distributions had a Speedo font package, but support was removed from X in the X11R7.0 release in 2005. Speedo fonts have the file extension .spd.
