= CST Thor =

The CST Thor series of personal computers are Sinclair QL-compatible systems designed and produced by Cambridge Systems Technology during the late 1980s.

== Thor PC ==
Thor PC
- Also known as: Thor 1, Thor 8
- Developer: Cambridge Systems Technology
- Product family: CST Thor
- Type: Personal computer
- Released: 1986; 40 years ago
- Introductory price: £599 to £1399
- Operating system: ICE GUI, Sinclair QDOS, SuperBASIC
- CPU: 68008 @ 7.5 MHz
- Memory: 128 KB + 512 KB
- Storage: 2× Microdrive, 20 MB hard disk (Thor 2WF)
- Removable storage: 3.5-inch floppy drives
- Display: PAL TV or Monitor; 256×256 (8 colours); 512×256 (4 colours)
- Graphics: ZX8301
- Sound: Intel 8049
- Connectivity: expansion slot, ROM cartridge socket, dual RS-232 ports, proprietary QLAN local area network ports, Centronics, dual joystick ports, external Microdrive bus
- Backward compatibility: Sinclair QL

The original Thor PC (also called Thor 1, sometimes also retrospectively referred to as the Thor 8), was launched in 1986, as a logical progression of CST's QL peripheral business after production of the Sinclair QL was halted.

The remaining stock of QL parts were purchased from Sinclair, and the standard QL motherboard (including a 7.5 MHz Motorola 68008 CPU and 128 KiB of RAM) was augmented with a CST-designed expansion board providing 512 KiB of additional RAM, extra ROMs, a non-volatile real-time clock, floppy disk, SCSI, Centronics parallel, IBM PC/AT-style keyboard and mouse interfaces enclosed in a low-profile metal desktop case with a built-in power supply.

Mass storage options consisted of one (Thor 1F) or two (Thor 2F) 3.5-inch floppy drives or one floppy drive and one 20 MB Rodime RO652 SCSI hard disk (Thor 2WF). The ROMs contained Eidersoft's ICE GUI and some QDOS extensions. Also, supplied with the Thor was a specially-commissioned version of the Psion Xchange application software suite (an enhanced edition of the Psion applications bundled with the QL).

Prices for the Thor PC ranged from £599 to £1399, excluding monitor, mouse and VAT. An upgrade service for existing QLs was also available.

== Thor 20/21 ==
The Thor 20 and Thor 21 are variants of the Thor PC, launched in April 1987 and fitted with a 68020 processor on a daughterboard in place of the original CPU. The new processor runs at 12.5 MHz, a 16.67 MHz option also being offered at higher cost.

The Thor 21 is also fitted with the 68881 floating-point co-processor, running at the same speed as the CPU. Performance is better than the Thor 1, but handicapped by the use of 8-bit memory in the base system.

The Thor 20 and 21 were shipped with a 68020 macro assembler and linker, plus Motorola processor documentation. They were intended as a vehicle for the development of software for a projected enhanced 68020-based model, later shelved.

The Thor 20 and 21 were expensive (a 12.5 MHz Thor 21 costing around twice as much as a Thor 1F) and were mainly placed on loan to the software development community.

== Thor XVI ==
The Thor XVI was developed in collaboration with the Danish company DanSoft and was announced at the Personal Computer World Show in September 1987.

Unlike the previous models, the Thor XVI's hardware is of a completely new design, based around an 8 MHz 68000 processor plus a 2 MHz 68B02 co-processor for audio and I/O processing. 512 KiB of RAM is included as standard (expandable to 2 MiB, later 6.5 MiB). The video hardware provides QL-compatible video modes as well as a new 16-colour mode.

Floppy disk, SCSI, Centronics, dual S5/8 serial ports, PC/AT keyboard, mouse, QL expansion bus and QLAN network interfaces are provided. Mass storage options are similar to the previous Thors, plus 40 MB hard disk and diskless network workstation configurations. The Thor XVI is housed in a case similar to that of the Thor PC.

The Thor XVI includes in ROM a QDOS-compatible operating system derived from QDOS 1.13, called Argos. Like its predecessors, the XVI is bundled with Xchange.

Production started in early 1988. Prices were slightly higher than the Thor PC. Later in 1988, a joint CST/DanSoft marketing operation, Thor International, was formed in Denmark in an attempt to increase sales to the European market. The Thor XVI hardware was revised slightly and production was moved to Brüel & Kjær in Denmark. Plans were also made to build Thor machines under license in Russia, but this came to nothing.

The following year, Thor International (and CST) collapsed amid acrimony and legal action over the disputed transfer of assets from the UK by the partners.
