= List of Sinclair QL clones =

The following is a list of clones of Sinclair Research's Sinclair QL microcomputer:

- Sandy QLT / Futura (only produced in prototype form)
- CST Thor series (Thor 1 / Thor 20 / Thor XVI)
- Qubbesoft Aurora (a replacement QL motherboard)
- Peter Graf's Qx0 series of motherboards: Q40, Q40i and Q60
- Peter Graf's Q68 (a stand-alone FPGA-based SMSQ/E-machine) and QIMSI Gold (an FPGA-based expansion for the original QL's ROM port that basically is a Q68)
- The ZX Spectrum Next FPGA-based computer

The following hardware devices provided QL compatibility for other computer platforms:

- Futura Datasenter QL Emulator for the Atari ST
- Jochen Merz's QVME card for the Atari MEGA STE and Atari TT
- Miracle Systems QXL and QXL II cards for PC compatibles

The ICL One Per Desk (also sold as the BT Merlin Tonto or the Telecom Australia Computerphone) shared some hardware components with the QL but was not intended to be software-compatible.

In addition, several software emulators of the QL exist including QPC, uQLX, QLay and Q-emuLator.

Not exactly software emulators, but rather QDOS-like OS replacements for other 68k-based machines are

- SMSQ/E for the Atari ST
- QDOS Clasic for the Amiga
