= List of Sinclair QL software =

This is a list of software titles produced for the Sinclair QL personal computer.

Notation: Program name (purpose), publisher, first release

== Utilities ==
=== # ===
- 3D Precision, High-Precision Imaging System, Digital Precision

=== A ===
- Abacus (Spreadsheet), Psion (Sinclair), 1984
- APL Interpreter
- ArcED, coWo
- Archive (Database), Psion (Sinclair), 1984
- Archivist database (Std and MP), A.R.K. (Richard Howe), 1984
- Assembler and Linker, Computer One
- Assembler, GST Computer Systems
- Assembler, Metacomco
- Assembler Workbench, Talent

=== B ===
- Banks of Plants, Toby Hodd, 1986
- BASIC TO CPORT, Translator from SuperBASIC to Kernighan & Ritchie C, Digital Precision
- BCPL Compiler, Metacomco
- Beule Tools, Peter Beule

=== C ===
- C Compiler (Small C), GST
- C Compiler (Lattice C), Metacomco c68
- Cad Pak, Datalink
- Cardfile database (128K and 256K), A.R.K. (Richard Howe), 1986
- Cartridge Doctor, Talent
- Cosmos, Talent
- CST Disk Utilities (Backup, Convert, Filed, Disc, Ramdrive), Cambridge Systems Technology

=== D ===
- Data Design (Database), The Progs
- Desktop Publisher, Digital Precision
- Desktop Publisher Special Edition, Digital Precision
- Digital C (Small C), Digital Precision
- Digital C Special Edition (~~K&R C), Digital Precision
- DISA (Intelligent Disassembler), JO
- Disk Mate 5, PM data (Pål Monstad)
- Disktool & Quickdisk, Ultrasoft (Martin Berndt)
- DJ Toolkit (DJTK)

=== E ===
- Easel (Business Graphics), Psion (Sinclair), 1984
- EasyPTR, Albin Hessler
- Eye-Q, Graphics System, Digital Precision
- Eye-Q Special Edition, Graphics System, Digital Precision

=== F ===
- Ferret (File Search Utility), Sector Software
- Fibu (Accounting), eTo soft
- Flashback (Database), Sector Software
- Forth, Computer One
- Fortran 77, Prospero
- Front Page, (Desktop Publisher), GAP Software

=== G ===
- Giga-BASIC, Giga-Soft (ABC Electronic)
- Giga-Chroma, Giga-Soft (ABC Electronic)
- Giga-Disassembler with Monitor, Giga-Soft (ABC Electronic)
- Grafix III, Digital Precision
- Graphics Toolkit, Ultrasoft (Martin Berndt)
- GraphiQL, Talent
- GST Assembler

=== I ===
- Ice Toolkit, Eidersoft (on EPROM)
- IDIS (Intelligent disassembler), Digital Precision
- IDIS Special Edition (Intelligent disassembler), Digital Precision
- Image D, PDQL

=== L ===
- Librarian database (128K and 256K), A.R.K. (Richard Howe), 1986
- Lightning, Text/Graphics/Maths Accelerator, Digital Precision
- Lightning Special Edition, Digital Precision
- Lisp Interpreter, Metacomco

=== M ===
- Macro Assembler, GST
- Mailfile database (128K and 256K), A.R.K. (Richard Howe), 1986
- Mailmerge, A.R.K. (Richard Howe), 1986
- Master Spy editor, A.R.K. (Richard Howe), 1988
- Media Manager md/fdd editor and repair tools, Digital Precision, 1986
- Mega Dictionary for Perfection, 360K word Spellchecker, Digital Precision
- Menu Extension, JMS
- M-Paint, Medic
- Monitor, Computer One
- Mon QL, Hisoft

=== N ===
- Nucleon, Pyramide

=== P ===
- Page Designer, Sector Software
- Page Designer 2, Sector Software
- Page Designer 3, Sector Software
- Paint Master, Shadow Games
- Pascal Compiler, Computer One
- Pascal (ISO 7185/ANSI 770×3.97), Prospero
- PC Conqueror (IBM PC emulator, supports MS-DOS v.3,4,5,6), Digital Precision
- PCB1, Talent
- PCB CAD, Lear Data Systems
- Peintre, Pyramide
- Perfect Pointer Tools, Digital Precision
- Perfection, Word Processor, Digital Precision
- Perfection Special Edition, Word Processor, Digital Precision
- Pointer's & Writer's Toolkit, JMS
- Professional Monitor, Compware
- Professional Publisher, Digital Precision

=== Q ===
Cover of QL Super Monitor

- QD, JMS
- Q-Draw, Psion, 1985
- QKick, Ultrasoft (Martin Berndt)
- QMATHS, Digital Precision
- QMATHS II, Digital Precision
- QMon, QJump
- QLOAD (SuperBASIC fast save/load), Liberation
- QL Cadette drafting system, Bestmalt Ltd (Mark Mansell), 1987
- QL Cash Trader (Cash Accounting Package), RWAP Software
- QL Cosmos (Astronomy Program), Talent available from RWAP Software (Programmer: G. F. Cornwell)
- QL Gardener, GCS (Sinclair)
- QL ICE, Eidersoft
- QL Paint (an edition of GraphiQL), Talent (Sinclair)
- QL Pascal Development Kit, Metacomco, 1985
- QL Payroll
- QL Project Planner, Triptych Publishing Ltd, 1985 - (PCM)
- QL Super Monitor, Digital Precision
- QL Toolbox, Ultrasoft (Martin Berndt)
- QLiberator Basic Compiler, Liberation
- QLone+, Ultrasoft (Martin Berndt)
- QPAC, QJump
- QPAC 2, QJump
- QPTR, QJump
- QRAM, QJump
- QREF (SuperBASIC Cross Reference), Liberation
- QTop (Desk, clock, demos, animator, index, snap), coWo, 1989
- QTYP, QJump
- Quick Layout, Gollmann
- Quill (Word processor), Psion, (Sinclair), 1984
- QZ II, Sector Software

=== R ===
- RPM Resident Procedure Manager, Liberation

=== S ===
- S-Edit, Ralf Reköndt/Ultrasoft (Martin Berndt)
- Sideways
- Spellbound Interactive Spelling Checker, Sector Software, 1987
- Spy editor, A.R.K. (Richard Howe), 1988
- SToQL
- Stripper file filter, A.R.K. (Richard Howe), 1986
- Super Astrologer, Digital Precision (Elmar Dunsser), 1985
- SuperBASIC Extension, Hisoft
- SuperCharge SuperBASIC compiler with Lenslok, Digital Precision
- SuperCharge Special Edition, Digital Precision
- SuperForth, (with Reversi/Othello game), Digital Precision
- Super Media Manager, Digital Precision
- Super Sprite Generator, Digital Precision
- SuperToolkit II, QJump (Care)
- SuperToolkit III, Ultrasoft (Martin Berndt)

=== T ===
- Task Master (Multitasking front end), Sector Software, 1987
- TechniQL (CAD software), Talent
- Text87 plus4 (Word processor), Software87
- The Painter by The Progs, 1988/1990
- Thing & EPROM Manager, JMS
- Thor-Desk, coWo, 1988
- Toolkit III, Ultrasoft (Martin Berndt)
- Touch Typist (Typing tutor), Sector Software, 1985
- Transfer Utility, Digital Precision
- TURBO (SuperBASIC compiler), Digital Precision, 1987
- TURBO TOOLKIT, Digital Precision, 1987

=== U ===
- UCSD Fortran-77, TDI
- UCSD Pascal, TDI
- UCSD Toolkit, TDI

=== X ===
- XCHANGE (Office), Psion (Cambridge Systems Technology)

=== Z ===
- Zapper, Eidersoft
- Z88 Transfer, Mark Pfizenmazer

== Games ==
Cover of Matchpoint

Cover of QL Pawn

There are 109 commercial games on this list.

Name	Year	Publisher
3D Slime	1986	Datalink Systems Wales
Alien Hijack	1987	Chisoft, Talent Computer Systems and RWAP Software
Ambition	1988	Waye Ahead Software and Care Electronics
Aquanaut 471	1986	Microdeal
Area Radar Controller	1985	Shadow Games and RWAP Software
Baron Rouge	1985	Labochrome
BJ in 3D Land	1986	Eidersoft
BJ Returns	1985	Eidersoft
Blast Buggy	1985	Shadow Games
Blocklands Warrior	1986	Digital Precision Ltd
Breakout, Gun, Hunt, Pirate and Zfred	1986	Sinclair Research Ltd
Bridge Player	1984	CP Software
Bridge Player II		CP Software
Citadel	1985	Eidersoft
Computer Scrabble	1985	Leisure Genius
Crazy Painter	1985	Microdeal
Cuthbert in Space		Microdeal
Dark Side of the Moon	1986	Javid Systems and RWAP Adventures
D-Day		Games Workshop
Deathstrike	1987	Talent Computer Systems and RWAP Software
Dennis the Dwarf at the Funfear		RWAP Adventures
Double Block	1990	CGH Services and RWAP Software
Dragonhold	1986	Rubicon Computer Systems
Droidzone		Digital Precision Ltd and RWAP Software
E.V.A	1985	Westway Ltd and RWAP Software
Eagle	1985	Eidersoft
Executive Adventure	1985	Gemini Marketing Limited
Farmer	1987	Talent Computer Systems and RWAP Software
Flight Simulator	1985	Microdeal
Flightdeck	1988	Deltasoft and RWAP Software
Galactic Invaders	1985	Shadow Games
Galactic Invaders and Star Guard	1985	Shadow Games
Grey Wolf	1986	RWAP Software
Gwendoline	1985	Labochrome
Here We Go	1989	Impact Entertainments and CGH Services
Horrorday		Talent Computer Systems and RWAP Adventures
Hoverzone	1987	Talent Computer Systems and RWAP Software
Hyperdrive	1985	English Software
Jungle Eddi	1986	Talent Computer Systems and RWAP Software
Karate	1985	Eidersoft
Knight Flight	1985	Realtime Software and RWAP Software
Lands of Havoc	1985	Microdeal
Lost Kingdom of Zkul	1984	Talent Computer Systems and RWAP Adventures
MacSporran’s Lament	1989	CGH Services
Master Blaster	1985	Compugem Ltd
Master Warship	1986	Complex Data Systems UK Limited
Match Point	1985	Psion
M-Cosmic	1985	Medic Datasystems Ltd
M-Crunch	1985	Medic Datasystems Ltd
Metropolis	1985	Medic Datasystems Ltd
Mordon’s Quest	1985	Sinclair Research Ltd
Mortville Manor	1986	Pyramide
Nebula II	1985	Pyramide
Nemesis	1985	Paul P Brittain and Talent Computer Systems
Night Nurse	1985	Shadow Games, Talent Computer Systems and RWAP Software
Omega	1987	Caret Computers
Othello	1986	Pyramide
Pengi	1985	RWAP Software
Psion Chess	1984	Psion and Sinclair Research Ltd
Puzzle Mania	1987	Chisoft, Talent Computer Systems and RWAP Software
QL Bounder	1985	Sinclair Research Ltd
QL Cavern		Sinclair Research Ltd
QL Colour Quest	1985	PP Software
QL Compendium	1985	Equate
QL Defusion	1986	Realtime Software and RWAP Software
QL Fictionary	1985	Sinclair Research Ltd
QL Hopper	1985	Microdeal
QL Jabber	1984	Sinclair Research Ltd and RWAP Software
QL Meteor Storm	1985	Sinclair Research Ltd and RWAP Software
QL Pawn	1985	Sinclair Research Ltd
QL Quboids	1985	Sinclair Research Ltd
QL Quiz	1985	Megacycal Software
QL Reversi	1984	Sinclair Research Ltd
QL Wanderer	1986	Pyramide
Qlacman	1988	Talent Computer Systems
QLLIFE		Datamanagement
Quazimodo	1985	Shadow Games and RWAP Software
Quest – The Adventure	1985	Quest Automation Ltd
Quest for the Dragon Sword	1987	Byteback and RWAP Adventures
Return to Eden		Hallmark Software, CGH Services and RWAP Adventures
Sheriff of Grisly Gulch	1990	CGH Services
Spook	1985	Eidersoft
Squadrons	1985	Peakcrown Limited
Star Guard	1985	Shadow Games
Starplod	1988	CGH Services
Steve Davis Snooker		CDS Software
Stone Raider	1986	Microdeal, Talent Computer Systems and RWAP Software
Strip Poker	1987	Talent Computer Systems
Super Arcadia	1985	Digital Precision Ltd
Super Backgammon	1985	Digital Precision Ltd
Super Croupier	1986	Pyramide
Super Reversi	1985	Digital Precision Ltd
Superbomber	1986	Talent Computer Systems
Tankbusters	1986	Sellasoft
The Adventure	1985	Sinclair Research Ltd
The Fugitive	1989	DiRen
The King	1986	Microdeal
The Lost Pharaoh	1986	Talent Computer Systems and RWAP Software
The Open Golf	1986	RWAP Software
The Prawn		Talent Computer Systems and RWAP Adventures
The QL Epic Adventure	1991	CGH Services and RWAP Adventures
Trivia-QLUE	1985	RMG Enterprises
Tycoon		Newtech Publishing Ltd
Type 22	1987	Talent Computer Systems and RWAP Software
Uncle Loonie’s Legacy		CGH Services
Vroom	1986	Pyramide
War in the East	1986	Sharps Inc
West	1984	Talent Computer Systems and RWAP Adventures
Zapper	1985	Eidersoft
