= One Per Desk =

1980s computer/telecoms device

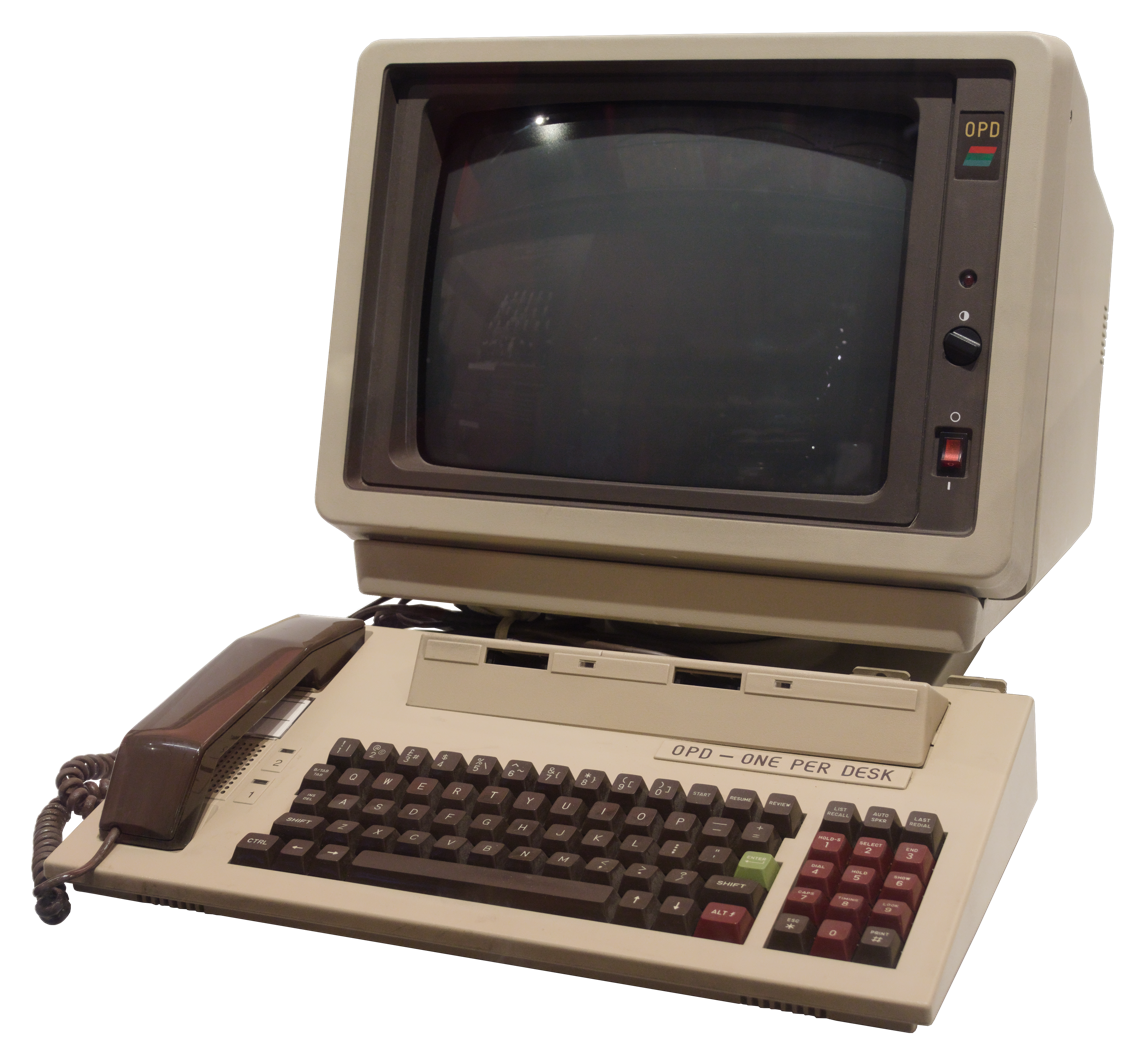
- ICL One Per Desk on display at the Science & Industry Museum, Manchester
- Also known as: OPD, Merlin Tonto, Computerphone
- Manufacturer: International Computers Limited (ICL)
- Type: personal computer / telecommunications terminal
- Released: 1984; 42 years ago
- Operating system: BFS ("Basic Functional Software")
- CPU: Motorola 68008
- Memory: 128 KB
- Storage: 2× Microdrive
- Graphics: ZX8301
- Sound: TMS5220 speech synthesiser
- Connectivity: V.21/V.23 modem

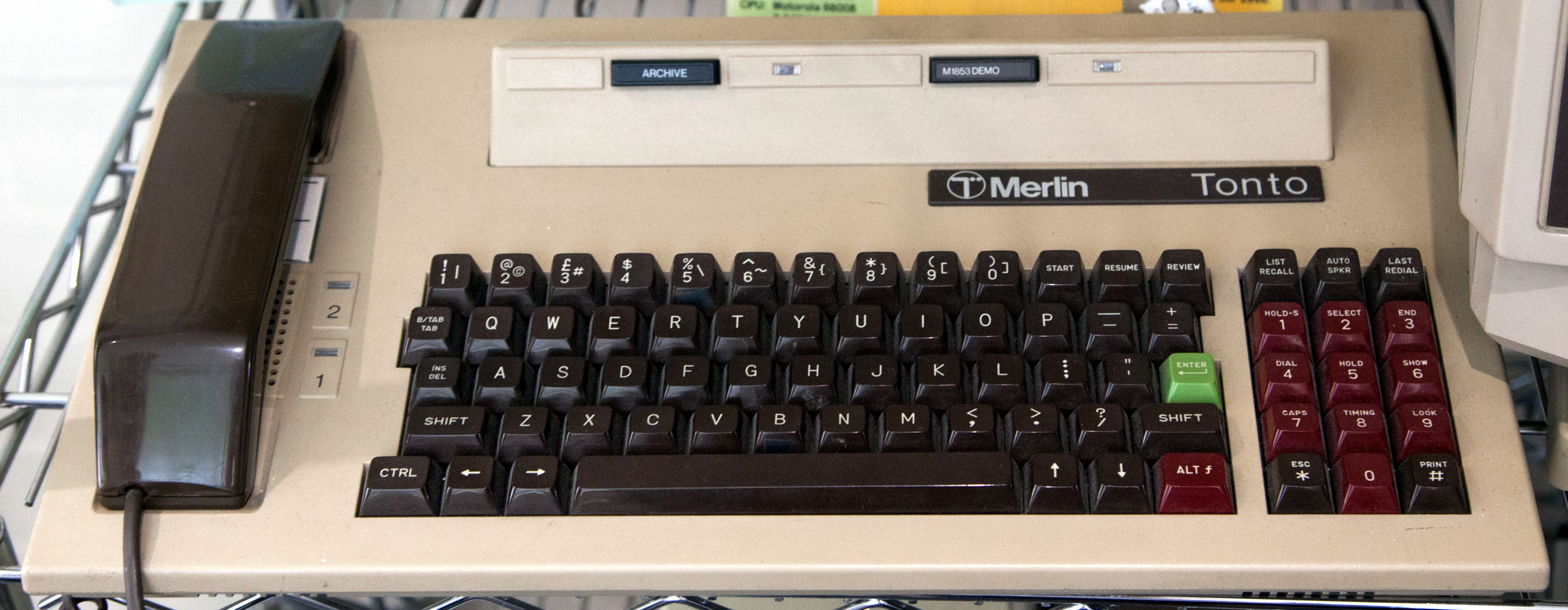
Merlin Tonto at The National Museum of Computing

The One Per Desk, or OPD, was a British innovative hybrid personal computer and telecommunications terminal based on the hardware of the Sinclair QL. The One Per Desk was built by International Computers Limited (ICL) and launched in the United Kingdom in 1984. It was designed to run business-related software packages, not as a general-purpose computer.

Rebadged versions of the OPD were sold in the UK by British Telecom as the Merlin Tonto, and as the Computerphone by Telecom Australia and the New Zealand Post Office.

== Hardware ==
The OPD was the result of a collaborative project between ICL, Sinclair Research and British Telecom, begun in 1983, which had originally intended to incorporate Sinclair's flat-screen CRT technology.

From the QL, the OPD borrowed the 68008 CPU, ZX8301/8302 ULAs, 128 KB of RAM and dual Microdrives (re-engineered by ICL for greater reliability) but not the Intel 8049 Intelligent Peripheral Controller. Unique to the OPD was a telephony module incorporating an Intel 8051 microcontroller (which also controlled the keyboard), two PSTN lines and a V.21/V.23 modem, plus a built-in telephone handset and a Texas Instruments TMS5220 speech synthesiser (for automatic answering of incoming calls).

The OPD was supplied with either a 9-inch monochrome (white) monitor, priced at £1,195 plus VAT, or a 14-inch colour monitor at £1,625 plus VAT. The monitors also housed the power supply for the OPD itself.

Later, 3.5" floppy disk drives were also available from third-party vendors.

== Software ==
The OPD was intended for non-technical users carrying out business tasks; it was not a general-purpose computer. The core software was provided by ICL in read-only memory (ROM), and additional software packages could be accessed by plugging in "capsules" (a PROM chip on a small printed circuit board); there were options for two, four or six capsule slots.

The system firmware (BFS or "Basic Functional Software") was unrelated to the QL's Qdos operating system, although a subset of SuperBASIC was provided on Microdrive cartridge. The BFS provided application-switching, voice/data call management, call answering, phone number directories, Viewdata terminal emulation and a simple calculator.

The Psion applications suite bundled with the QL was also ported to the OPD as Xchange and was available as an optional ROM pack, priced at £130. Other optional application software available on ROM included various terminal emulators such as Satellite Computing's ICL7561 emulator, plus their Action Diary and presentation software, address book, and inter-OPD communications utilities.

An ICL-supplied application was used to synchronise a national bingo game across hundreds of bingo halls in the UK. The integral V.23 dialup modem was used to provide remote communications to the central server.

Several of ICL's mainframe (Series 39) customers in the UK, in local government and Ministry of Defence sectors, used statistics applications on OPD systems to view graphical representations of mainframe reports. Here too, the integral V.23 modem was used to download data from the mainframe.

== Marketing ==
Initial orders were worth £4.5 million (for 1500 units) from British Telecom and £8 million from Telecom Australia, with ICL focusing on telecommunications providers as the means to reach small- and medium-sized businesses. Sales of the OPD worth $42 million were reportedly made by ICL within the first nine months of the product becoming available, largely involving contracts with British Telecom and the telecommunications authorities of Australia, Hong Kong and New Zealand.

=== Merlin Tonto ===
British Telecom Business Systems sold the OPD as the Merlin M1800 Tonto. BT intended the Tonto to be a centralised desktop information system able to access online services, mainframes and other similar systems through the BT telephone network. The Tonto retailed at £1,500 at launch. OPD peripherals and software ROM cartridges were also badged under the Merlin brand. BT withdrew support for the Tonto in February 1993. The name Tonto was derived from "The Outstanding New Telecoms Opportunity".

A data communications adapter was introduced for the Tonto as a plug-in option or fitted on new units, providing a standard RS423 interface for use with mainframe computers or data communications networks, permitting the use of the Tonto as a VT100 terminal. A separate VT Link product provided support for VT52 and VT100 emulation for mainframe access over dial-up connections.

Work on the Tonto influenced the design of a follow-on product by BT's Communications Terminal Products Group and Rathdown Industries known as the QWERTYphone, which aimed to provide the telephony features of the Tonto at "a much lower cost and in a more user-friendly manner".

=== ComputerPhone ===
The device was branded as ComputerPhone by Telecom Australia and the New Zealand Post Office. Aimed at the growing office automation market and seeking to integrate computing and telecommunications, combining support for both voice and data, the product was perceived as the first of its kind designed to meet the needs of managers, who would be relying on old-fashioned paper-based practices to perform their "complex and heavy workloads" involving a variety of ongoing activities including meetings, telephone calls, research, administration and numerous other tasks. Such potential users of information technology had apparently been ignored by office automation efforts, and personal computers were perceived as "exceeding most managers' requirements". The ComputerPhone attempted to sit between more specialised telephony devices and more advanced workstations, being marketed as an "executive" workstation in Australia, and more towards middle management in New Zealand. Advertisements emphasised the telephony, office suite, desktop calculator, videotex, terminal and electronic messaging capabilities.

=== MegaOPD ===
An enhanced version of the OPD called the MegaOPD was produced in small numbers for the United States market. This had a 68008FN CPU, 256 KB of RAM as standard, an RS-232 port and enhanced firmware. The telephone answering function had a female voice, with a slight New Jersey accent.

== Legacy ==
ICL's strategic incoherence, particularly in its low-end personal computing products, was the subject of some criticism, with the One Per Desk being identified as "the pick of the bunch" in the company's attempts to address niche applications with arbitrary products. Described as a "wildly visionary product" and an "original concept marred by a woefully inadequate implementation", even years later it stubbornly remained a "constant reproach to the company".
