= Miracle Systems =

British computer upgrades company, 1983–2004

Miracle Systems Ltd
- Company type: Limited company
- Industry: Computing; Electronics
- Founded: 1983
- Defunct: 2004
- Products: Expanderam, Trump Card, Gold Card, Super Gold Card, QXL

Miracle Systems Ltd. were a manufacturer of personal computer peripherals and upgrades, specializing in the Sinclair QL, in the 1980s and early 1990s.

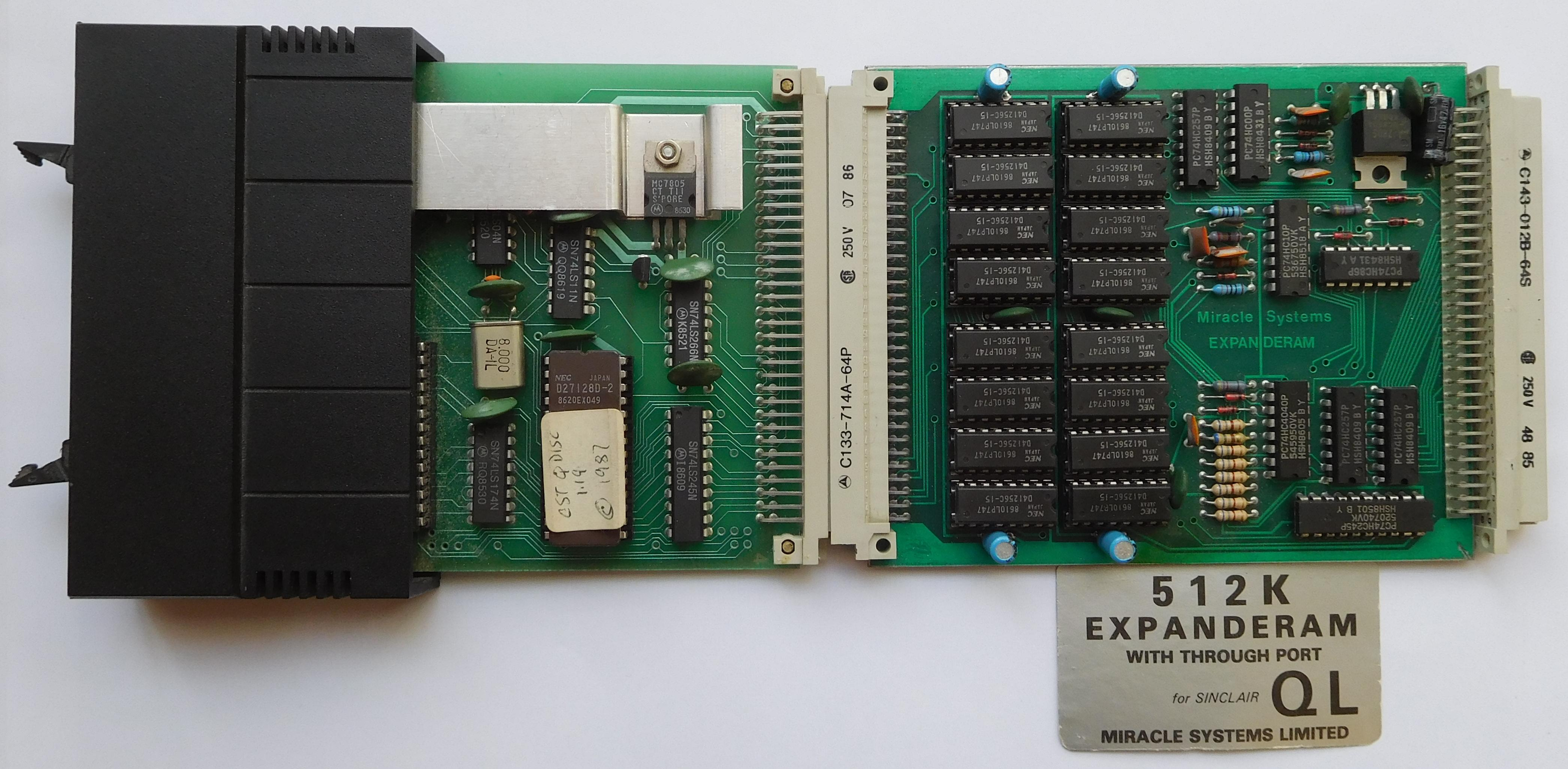
Expanderam and CST floppy disk interface for Sinclair QL

The company was incorporated in February 1983. Initially, they produced simple peripherals such as an RS-232 to Centronics parallel printer interface adapter. Later, they designed the Expanderam series of RAM expansion cards for the QL, which led to the Trump Card combined RAM expansion and floppy disk interface. This was notable in that it mapped RAM into memory space reserved for external peripheral devices, thus allowing the QL's RAM to be expanded to 768 kB rather than the official limit of 512 kB.

The Trump Card was later superseded by the Gold Card processor upgrade card. This replaced the QL's 68008 CPU with a 16 MHz 68000 and included 2 MB of RAM, a floppy disk interface (supporting DD, HD, and ED density 3.5 in drives) and a non-volatile real-time clock. Gold Card plugged into the QL expansion slot and required no internal modifications to the host QL.

The follow-up Super Gold Card had a 24 MHz 68020 CPU, 4MB of RAM, and added a Centronics parallel printer interface.

In 1993, Miracle launched the QXL QL emulator card for PCs. This comprised a 20 MHz (later 25 MHz) 68EC040 processor, up to 8 MB of RAM and an FPGA on an ISA card. The QXL ran the SMSQ Qdos-compatible operating system and used the host PC's disks, screen, keyboard, serial and parallel ports via an MS-DOS "server". Two QLAN-compatible network ports were also provided on the QXL card.

The company was finally wound up in August 2004.

== See also ==
- Cambridge Systems Technology
- Sinclair QL
- Sinclair Research
