= SMSQ/E =

- Developer: Tony Tebby, Wolfgang Lenerz, Marcel Kilgus and other volunteers
- OS family: Sinclair QDOS
- Source model: Open source
- Latest release: 3.43 / January 12, 2026; 2 days ago
- Supported platforms: M68k
- License: BSD license
- Official website: www.wlenerz.com/smsqe/

SMSQ/E is a computer operating system originally developed in France by Tony Tebby, the designer of the original QDOS operating system for the Sinclair QL personal computer. It began life as SMSQ, a QDOS-compatible version of SMS2 intended for the Miracle Systems QXL emulator card for PCs. This was later developed into an extended version, SMSQ/E, for the Atari ST. It consists of a QDOS compatible SMS kernel, a rewritten SuperBASIC interpreter called SBasic, a complete set of SuperBASIC procedures and functions and a set of extended device drivers originally written for the QL emulator for the Atari ST.

It also integrates many extensions previously only available separately for the QL, like Toolkit II (quite essential SuperBASIC add-on), the Pointer Environment (the QL's mouse and windowing system) and the Hotkey System 2.

While SMSQ/E does not run on any unmodified QL, it runs on all of the more advanced QL compatible platforms, from the Miracle Systems (Super)GoldCard CPU plug-in cards to the Q60 motherboard.

== History ==
In late 1995 a German author, Marcel Kilgus, acquired the SMSQ/E sources for adaptation to his QL emulator QPC, which from then on did not emulate any specific QL hardware anymore but employed specially adapted device drivers to achieve a tighter integration and faster emulation.

In 2000, version 2.94 was the first QL operating system that broke free of the bounds of the QL 8 colour screen, introducing GD2 (Graphic Device Interface Version 2), a QL compatible 16-bit high colour graphics sub-system.

Up to version 2.99 the system was exclusively developed by Tony Tebby and Marcel Kilgus. In 2002, Tebby released all of his source code (which doesn't include most QPC specific parts), albeit under a license which is not open source under the Open Source Definition. With this step Tony Tebby finally left the QL scene, but development by volunteers continues to this day.

In early 2013 the current source code was re-released under the BSD license.

Currently SMSQ/E consists of approximately 2000 68k assembler source files containing about 222,000 lines of code.
