= Jan Jones (novelist) =

British writer and software engineer

Janice Rosemary Jones
- Born: 24 December 1955 (age 70)
- Occupations: Software engineer, novelist
- Writing career
- Pen name: Jan Jones
- Language: English
- Period: 2005-present
- Genre: Romance
- Website: www.jan-jones.co.uk

Janice Rosemary Jones (known as Jan Jones) (born 24 December 1955) is a British former software engineer, now a writer of romantic fiction and short stories. Her debut novel, Stage By Stage, was published in July 2005 and won the Romantic Novelists' Association Joan Hessayon Award the same year.

In her first career as software engineer, she was the architect of the SuperBASIC programming language for the Sinclair QL personal computer while working at Sinclair Research in the early 1980s. Before joining Sinclair Research, she worked at British Gas and the Royal School of Mines as a programmer and lecturer.

== Bibliography ==
=== Technical ===
- QL SuperBasic: The Definitive Handbook. McGraw-Hill, 1984 ISBN 0070847843 (e-book reissue 2014)

=== Fiction ===
==== Single novels ====
- Stage by Stage (2005)
- Fair Deception (2009)
- Fortunate Wager (2009)
- The Kydd Inheritance (2011)

==== Penny Plain Mysteries ====
1. The Jigsaw Puzzle (2013)
2. Just Desserts (2014)
3. Local Secrets (2014)

==== Anthology in collaboration ====
- Holiday Fling (2014) (with Christina Jones, Jane Wenham-Jones, Jane Bidder, Grace Wynne-Jones, Gill Sanderson, Eve Bourton, Caroline Dunford and Laura Wilkinson)
