= Q40 =

Q40 may refer to:

- Q40 (motherboard), compatible with the Sinclair QL
- Q40 (New York City bus)
- Al-Shamikh, a corvette of the Royal Navy of Oman
- Ghafir, the 40th chapter of the Quran
- Infiniti G-series (Q40/Q60), an automobile
- Samsung Sens Q40, a laptop
