= Timeworks Publisher =

Desktop publishing application

Timeworks Publisher, Timeworks DTP, Publish-It!
- Original author: Timeworks
- Developer: GST Software
- Release: 1987; 39 years ago (Atari ST)
- Stable release: Publisher 4.6 (Windows) / 2009; 17 years ago
- Operating system: GEM, Macintosh, Windows
- Type: Desktop publishing
- License: Proprietary commercial software

Timeworks Publisher was a desktop publishing (DTP) program produced by GST Software in the United Kingdom and published by Timeworks, Inc., in the United States.

It is notable as the first affordable DTP program for the IBM PC. In appearance and operation, it was a Ventura Publisher clone, but it was possible to run it on a computer without a hard disk.

== Versions ==
=== Timeworks Desktop Publisher ===
Timeworks Publisher 1 for Atari TOS relied on the GDOS software components, which were available from Atari but were often distributed with applications that required them. GDOS provided TOS/GEM with a standardized method for installing printer drivers and additional fonts, although these were limited to bitmapped fonts in all the later releases. GDOS had a reputation for being difficult to configure, using a lot of system resources, and was fairly buggy, meaning that Timeworks could struggle to run on systems without a hard disk and less than 2 MB of memory - but it was possible, and for many users Timeworks was an inexpensive introduction to desktop publishing.

For the IBM PC, Timeworks ran on Digital Research's GEM Desktop (supplied with the program) as a runtime system. Later versions ran on Microsoft Windows.

Timeworks Publisher 2 included full WYSIWYG, paragraph tagging, manual control of kerning, text and graphics imports and more fonts. Timeworks Publisher 2.1 with GEM/5 is known to have supported Bézier curves already.

=== Acorn Desktop Publisher ===
In mid-1988, following the release of GST's word processor, First Word Plus, Acorn Computers announced that it had commissioned GST to port and enhance the Timeworks product for the Archimedes series. Being designed for use with RISC OS, using the anti-aliased font technology already demonstrated on the Archimedes, utilising the multi-tasking capabilities of the RISC OS desktop environment, and offering printed output support for laser and dot-matrix printers, availability was deferred until the release of RISC OS in April 1989. The delivered product, Acorn Desktop Publisher, introduced Acorn's outline font manager and bundled 14 scalable fonts plus upgraded printer drivers (for Postscript-compatible and Hewlett-Packard Laserjet-compatible printers, plus Integrex colour inkjet printers) to provide consistent, high-quality output on screen and paper.

Despite being described as "streets ahead" of Timeworks on the Atari ST, offering "real desktop publishing, not the pale imitation possible with a Master 128 or model B", being comparable to "mid-priced DTP packages on the Mac or IBM PC", the software was regarded as barely usable on a machine with 1 MB of RAM and no hard disk (Acorn recommended 2 MB to use the software alongside other applications), and the limitations in editing and layout facilities led one reviewer to note that at the £150 price level and with other desktop publishing packages (notably Computer Concepts' Impression, Beebug's Ovation, and Clares' Tempest) announced if not yet available, purchasers would be advised to "wait and see" before making any decision.

Nevertheless, with competitors still unavailable in early 1990, Acorn User deemed to be the platform's best desktop publishing package, noting that there was "little available yet for Archimedes DTP, although much is on the way soon". Ultimately, Acorn would promote Impression as part of its Publishing System package. Of the other anticipated competitors, Ovation was released later in 1990, and succeeded by Ovation Pro in 1996, having been previewed in 1995, whereas Tempest was apparently never released, being absent from Clares' software catalogue.

Curiously, Tempest was itself described as being "based on the Acorn DTP package" but aiming to remedy deficiencies and provide enhancements such as multi-column frames, "text flow around regular shapes", and improved text editing support, along with memory management facilities. Developed by a freelance programmer for Clares, a pre-release version was demonstrated in late 1989, apparently requiring only 128 KB of RAM, with work underway to optimise the display routines. A price of £129.95 including VAT was announced. Initially destined for an autumn 1989 release, it was postponed to an unspecified point in time in September 1989 with the specification having changed, but hints of a 1990 release were subsequently made in early 1990. Although a demo disk was apparently available, the product was widely advertised, and a preview of the software appeared in a late 1990 magazine issue, the product was evidently not completed. Clares later took over development of another Acorn product, the spreadsheet Schema, in 1990.

=== Publish-It! ===
In the U.S., Timeworks Inc. marketed the program as Publish-It!. Released in 1987, there were versions available for IBM PC (running over the GEM environment), Mac, and Apple II (Enhanced IIe or better) computers.

Further versions were named KeyPublisher 1.0 (versions 1.19 and 1.21) and produced by Softkey Software Products Inc. in 1991 for PCs with GEM. Another version, aimed at the business market, was named DESKpress. A later CD-based multilingual version for Windows was named Press International.

=== Other names ===
The product was also sold under other names including NEBS PageMagic (changed after objections from Adobe), Macmillan Publisher, Canon Publisher, and many other brands, distinguished by use of the .DTP file extension. The latest version was sold as Greenstreet Publisher 4 and is downwards file compatible with earlier versions.

== Releases ==
- 1987 - Timeworks Publisher (IBM PC, Atari ST)
- 1987 - Timeworks Publish-It! 1.12 (IBM PC GEM-based)
- 19?? - Publish-It! 1.19 by GST
- 1987 - Publish-It! (Apple IIe)
- 1988 - Acorn Desktop Publisher
- 1990 - Publish-It! 1.20 (IBM PC)
- 1990 - Publish-It! Easy 2.0 (Macintosh)
- 1991 - KeyPublisher 1 by softkey (IBM PC)
- 1991 - Timeworks Publisher 2 (IBM PC, Atari ST) GEM-based
- 1991 - Timeworks Publish-It! PC 2.00 (IBM PC)
- 1991 - Publish-It! Easy 2.1 (Macintosh)
- 1992 - Publish-It! Easy 2.1.9 (Macintosh)
- 199? - Timeworks Publisher 2.1 (IBM PC - GEM/5-based)
- 1992 - Timeworks Publisher 3 (IBM PC for Windows)
- 1994 - Timeworks Publish-It! 4 (Windows 3.1)
- 2009 - Publisher 4.6 Home & Business (Windows XP, Vista)

== See also ==
- Fleet Street Publisher
- PagePlus
