= S5/8 =

S5/8 was a serial communications standard devised in the United Kingdom in the 1980s as a simplified subset of RS-232 intended to make interoperability easier. Although published by the British Standards Institution as standard DD 153:1990, it was not widely adopted, and the BSI standard was later withdrawn.

== Description ==
S5/8 differed from RS-232 in using 0 and +5 V signalling levels, simplified handshaking, and a fixed data transfer rate of 9600 bits per second. An 8-pin DIN 45326 connector was specified as standard, although a physically compatible 180-degree 5-pin DIN connector could be used to carry a subset of the signals. Data transmission consisted of frames containing one start bit, 8 data bits and one stop bit, with no parity bit.

Two classes of device were specified, D and S. D-devices could supply power (5 V up to 20 mA) at the connector, whereas S-devices could derive power from a connected D-device.

== Pin assignment ==
Number	Name	Description
1	DINP	Data input
2	GROUND	Signal ground
3	DOUT	Data output
4	HINP	Handshake input
5	HOUT	Handshake output
6	SINP	Secondary input
7	SOUT	Secondary output
8	V+	+5 volts

== Applications ==
The S5/8 standard was adopted by a few British microcomputers, such as the Thorn EMI Liberator and the CST Thor XVI, as well as some versions of MSX computers, such as Yamaha CX11 and YIS-503 and its derivatives, the Sakhr MSX series.
