= Cave of the Word Wizard =

1982 educational video game

- Developer: Electronic Speech Systems
- Publisher: Timeworks
- Designer: Patrick Quinn
- Platform: Commodore 64
- Release: 1982
- Genre: Educational

Cave of the Word Wizard is a 1982 educational children's game released for the Commodore 64 by Timeworks, Inc. It is designed to teach spelling.

== Gameplay ==
The game is set in a multilevel wizard's cave where the player must spell words to overcome obstacles. The goal is to navigate the dungeon with a flashlight, finding crystals to exit the dungeon. The player spells words by typing on the keyboard and they are simultaneously displayed on the screen. The spoken commands and words are delivered in American English, through the computer audio output. Ten lists of words are provided for spelling, in graduated difficulty; custom lists can also be made. A list is selected at the start of each game.

At intervals, the "Word Wizard" appears and commands the player to spell a word. If spelled correctly, the player is rewarded. If the player waits too long or spells it wrongly, they are get admonished and the flashlight loses energy.
