= Thorn EMI Liberator =

- Developer: Thorn EMI Datatech
- Type: Portable computer
- Released: 1985
- Discontinued: September 1986
- Operating system: CP/M
- CPU: Zilog Z80A
- Memory: 40 kB of internal RAM as standard
- Graphics: LCD (480 x 128 pixels)/ (80 columns by 16 lines of text)

The Thorn EMI Liberator was a laptop word processor, produced in the United Kingdom by Thorn EMI Datatech, then in Feltham Middlesex, primarily intended for use by UK Government civil servants. Released in 1985, it is considered to be the first mass-produced British laptop. Thorn EMI Datatech simultaneously held the contracts for the repair of the Sinclair ZX80 and ZX81.

== History ==
The design of the Liberator was instigated in 1983 by the UK Government's Central Computer and Telecommunications Agency (CCTA). It was envisaged as a portable device to allow civil servants to write and print their own reports, rather than using the services of typists. The CCTA initially contacted Dragon Data to develop the product, but the company went into administration shortly afterwards, and the engineering team were taken on by Thorn EMI to continue the project in 1984.

The team consisted of five former Dragon Data employees. Derek Williams headed up the business side of the endeavour, working closely with the CCTA and Thorn EMI senior management. John Peacock managed the finances, vendors, and component suppliers. Jan Wojna designed the hardware and packaging of the electronics into the custom designed case. Duncan Smeed wrote the low level system software and worked closely with Digital Research on the operating system implementation. John Linney created the embedded word processor and terminal emulation applications.

The Liberator entered limited production in early 1985 and was officially launched in September of that year, with PR from Aspect Public Relations. The journalist launch was the first promotional event held in the Cabinet War Rooms.

Despite plans for improved Liberator Mk1A and Mk2 variants, production of the Liberator ended in September 1986.

== Description ==
The Liberator was based on a Zilog Z80A microprocessor and a Gate array implementing the screen controller, keyboard interface and other I/O logic. The LCD had a resolution of 480 x 128 pixels, or 80 columns by 16 lines of text. Interfaces comprised two S5/8 serial ports and two expansion buses, one specifically for extra RAM. Two battery packs were available, a NiCad rechargeable pack giving 12 hours operation, or one holding four AA cells giving 16 hours. The Liberator had 40 kB of internal RAM as standard, plus an optional 24 kB which could be write-protected by means of an external switch and had its own button cell battery to provide non-volatile storage. Another 24 kB of non-volatile RAM could be plugged into the external RAM expansion bus.

The Liberator's custom wordprocessing software ran under the CP/M operating system.

The external dimensions of the Liberator were 295 x 252 x 35mm.
