= 68K/OS =

Operating system for the Sinclair QL microcomputer

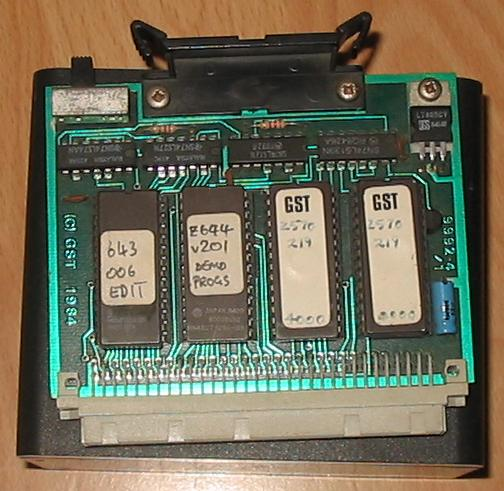
- 68K/OS EPROM expansion card
- Developer: GST Computer Systems
- OS family: Disk operating systems
- Working state: Discontinued
- Source model: Closed source
- Initial release: 1984; 42 years ago
- Supported platforms: Sinclair QL microcomputer
- Default user interface: Command-line interface or menu

68K/OS was a computer operating system developed by GST Computer Systems for the Sinclair QL microcomputer.

It was commissioned by Sinclair Research in February 1983. However, after the official launch of the QL in January 1984, 68K/OS was rejected, and production QLs shipped with Sinclair's own Qdos operating system.

GST later released 68K/OS as an alternative to Qdos, in the form of an EPROM expansion card, and also planned to use it on single-board computers based on the QL's hardware.

The operating system was developed by Chris Scheybeler, Tim Ward, Howard Chalkley and others.
