= Fleet Street Publisher =

Atari ST desktop publishing software

- Developer: Mirrorsoft
- Initial release: 1986; 40 years ago (Atari ST)
- Stable release: Fleet Street Publisher 3.0 / 1989; 37 years ago
- Operating system: GEM
- Type: Desktop publishing
- License: Proprietary commercial software

Fleet Street Publisher was an Atari ST desktop publishing program produced by Mirrorsoft in the United Kingdom and released in November 1986. It was distributed in the United States by Spectrum Holobyte. A IBM PC compatible version produced by Rowan Software was planned for 1987 but never released.

Running under GEM the program offered features such as multi-column text, the ability to design flow charts and graphics and multiple document sizes (flyers, menus, cards, etc.). Possible font sizes ranged from 4 to 216 points with support for accented characters. Character and line spacing where fully controllable by the user. The software came with a 150 image clipart gallery.

Although relatively well reviewed, it was generally superseded by Timeworks Publisher (Publish-It in the United States), which the market regarded as a much better product.

== Versions ==
- Fleet Street Publisher (1986, published by Spectrum Holobyte and France Image Logiciel)
- Fleet Street Publisher 1.1 (1987, published by Mirrorsoft)
- Fleet Street Publisher 2.0 (1989, published by MichTron)
- Fleet Street Publisher 3.0 (1989, published by MichTron)
