= Word Writer 128 =

Word Writer 128 is a word processor published in 1986 by Timeworks for the Commodore 128 in native mode. It had 40- and 80-column modes, and was compatible with both the 1541 and 1571 disk drives. The program could handle documents up to 64Kb in size. It was a form of trialware, since Timeworks pledged that if a purchaser found a better program within 90 days, they would buy it for them.
