= Jane Wenham-Jones =

British writer (1962–2021)

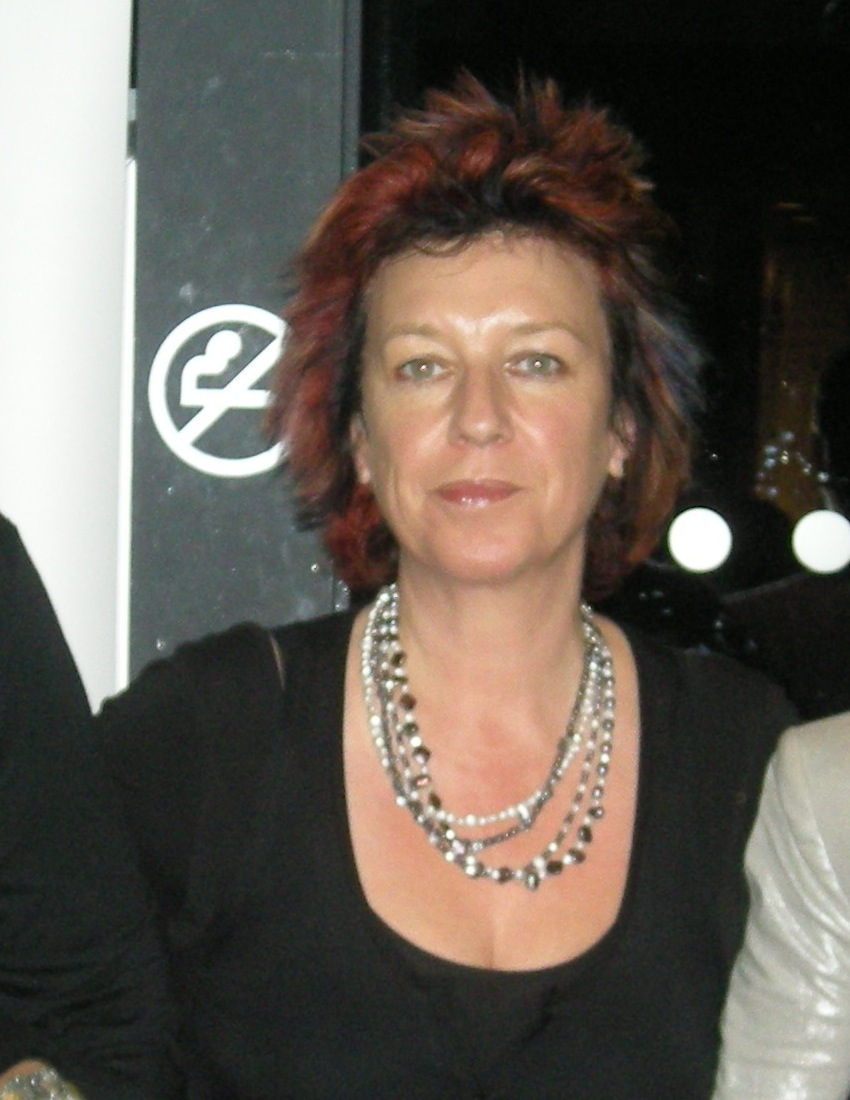
- Wenham-Jones in 2012
- Born: 12 January 1962; North Cray, Kent, England
- Died: 22 August 2021 (aged 59)
- Occupations: Author, journalist and presenter
- Years active: 1990–2021

Jane Wenham-Jones (12 January 1962 – 22 August 2021) was an English author, journalist, presenter, interviewer, creative writing tutor, and speaker who lived in Broadstairs, Kent, a town that appears in four of her novels.

She was a regular contributor to Writing Magazine, Woman's Weekly and the Isle of Thanet News, and previously wrote columns for the Isle of Thanet Gazette, Booktime and Woman's Weekly Fiction Special.

== Early life ==
Wenham-Jones was born in North Cray (then in Kent, now in Bexley) and grew up in Broadstairs on the Kent coast. Wenham-Jones attended St Mildred's Primary School and Dane Court Grammar School.

== Career ==
Wenham-Jones began her writing career in 1995 and published novels, short stories, non-fiction articles and two Wannabe writing guides, in which, in "Wannabe a Writer", she coined the phrase 'Writer's Bottom'.

More than a hundred of her short stories have been published in magazines across the world including Active Life, Bella, Best, Candis, Chat, More, My Weekly, The People's Friend, Pulp Fiction, Take a Break, Take a Break Fiction Feast, Woman, Woman's Weekly, Woman's Realm, and Your Cat. A selection of these stories have been reprinted in Australia, Norway, South Africa, Sweden, and The US.

Her short stories have also appeared in fiction anthologies including Café Olé Too Hot To Handle, Diamonds and Pearls, Loves Me, Loves Me Not, and the Sexy Shorts Charity Series.

Non-fiction contributions include The Help for Heroes Cookbook, Tweet Treats, Women Leading, and The You Are What You Eat Cookbook.

Wenham-Jones had regular columns in Writing Magazine, and was an occasional contributor to her local paper, The Isle of Thanet News. She wrote, or contributed to, articles in The Bookseller, The Daily Express, Family Circle, The Guardian, The Isle of Thanet Gazette (a weekly column from 2001 to 2015), My Weekly, The New Writer, Psychologies, Scarlet Magazine, She, Sunday Express, The Sunday Times, The Times, Woman, Woman's Own, Woman's Weekly, Writing.ie and The Weekender.

She was a member of Equity and presented for both BBC Radio Kent and the BBC's Politics Show. Other television appearances included The Heaven and Earth Show, Inside Out, Just for Starters, Kilroy, Legal TV, Loose Lips, The Property Channel, Ready, Steady, Cook, The Russell Grant Show, The Salon, and The Wright Stuff.

Wenham-Jones was an interviewee of Sue Cook for The Write Lines in conjunction with Talking Bookshelf and National Short Story Week.

As a professional speaker, she gave lectures and after-dinner talks including for Women Speakers. She hosted the award ceremony for the Romantic Novelists' Association's Romantic Novel of the Year Award 2011, 2012, 2013, 2014, 2015, 2016, 2017, 2018 and 2019, hosting with: actor Tim Bentinck (2011), crime novelist Peter James (2012), Richard Madeley and Judy Finnigan (2013), Darcey Bussell (2014), Barbara Taylor Bradford (2015), Fern Britton (2016), Prue Leith (2017), Richard Coles (2018), Alison Weir (2019), Jenny Eclair (2020), and Larry Lamb (2021).

As well as hosting events at Guildford Book Festival, Chipping Norton Literature Festival, Belfast Book Festival, Buckingham Lit Fest, and Whitstable Literary Festival (WhitLit), Wenham-Jones was a founding member of, and regular interviewer for, BroadstairsLit.

Jane was listed on Fantastic Fiction, Dorothy Koomson's, Random House, and HarperCollins websites.

== Death ==
She died on 22 August 2021, aged 59.

== Awards ==
- 2013: Romantic Novelists' Association Romantic Comedy Novel of the Year, shortlist, "Prime Time"
- 2020: Kent Columnist of the Year Award Kent Press and Broadcast Awards (Isle of Thanet News)

== Bibliography ==
Novels

- Raising the Roof (2001)
- Perfect Alibis (2003)
- One Glass is Never Enough (2005)
- Prime Time (2011)
- Mum in the Middle (2018)
- The Big Five-O (2019)
- Old Enough to Know Better (2021)

Writing guides

- Wannabe a Writer (2007)
- Wannabe a Writer We've Heard Of (2010)

Short Story Anthologies (contributor)

- Sexy Shorts For Christmas (2003)
- Sexy Shorts For Lovers (2004)
- Sexy Shorts For Chefs (2005)
- Sexy Shorts For Summer (2005)
- Café Olé Too Hot To Handle (2005)
- Shorts for the Beach (2006)
- Loves Me, Loves Me Not (2009)
- Diamonds and Pearls (2011)

Non-fiction (author)

- 100 Ways to Fight the Flab – And Still Have Wine And Chocolate (2014)

Non-fiction (contributor)

- Women Leading (2004)
- The You Are What You Eat Cookbook (2005)
- The Help for Heroes Cookbook (2009)
- Tweet Treats (2011)
