= Cambridge Systems Technology =

Computer Company

- Company type: Limited company
- Industry: Computing; Electronics
- Founded: early 1980s
- Founder: David Oliver, Martin Baines
- Defunct: late 1980s
- Products: IEEE 488, floppy disk and SCSI interfaces; CST Thor computers

Cambridge Systems Technology (CST) was a company formed in the early 1980s by ex-Torch Computers engineers David Oliver and Martin Baines, to produce peripherals for the BBC Micro, and later, with Graham Priestley, Sinclair QL microcomputers. Products included IEEE 488, floppy disk and SCSI interfaces.

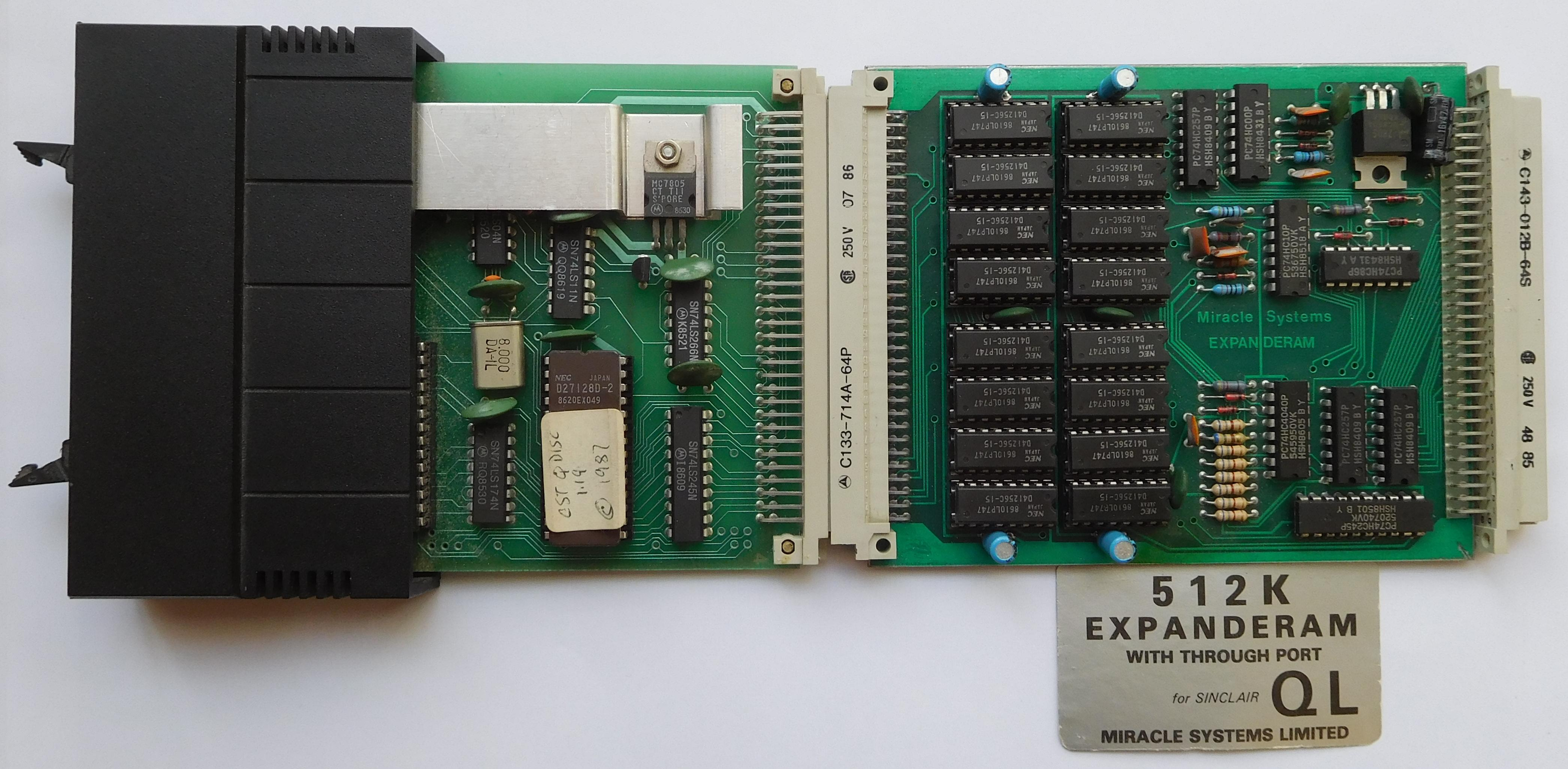
CST floppy disk interface and Expanderam for Sinclair QL

Following the demise of the Sinclair QL in 1986, CST began producing the Thor series of QL-compatible personal computers. These had limited commercial success, and CST had ceased trading by the end of the decade.

== See also ==
- Miracle Systems
- Sinclair QL
- Sinclair Research
