= Sinclair QDOS =

QDOS
- Developer: Tony Tebby whilst working at Sinclair Research
- Written in: Motorola 68000 assembly language
- Initial release: April 1984; 42 years ago
- Latest release: 1.13
- Available in: Spanish, French, German, Italian, Swedish
- Supported platforms: Motorola 68008
- License: proprietary
- Preceded by: 68K/OS

QDOS is the multitasking operating system found on the Sinclair QL personal computer and its clones. It was designed by Tony Tebby whilst working at Sinclair Research, as an in-house alternative to 68K/OS, which was later cancelled by Sinclair, but released by original authors GST Computer Systems. Its name is not regarded as an acronym and sometimes written as Qdos in official literature. During early development it was referred to internally as “Domesdos”.

QDOS was implemented in Motorola 68000 assembly language, and on the QL, resided in 48 KB of ROM, consisting of either three 16 KB EPROM chips or one 32 KB and one 16 KB ROM chip. These ROMs also held the SuperBASIC interpreter, an advanced variant of BASIC programming language with structured programming additions. This also acted as the QDOS command-line interpreter.

Facilities provided by QDOS included management of processes (or "jobs" in QDOS terminology), memory allocation, and an extensible "redirectable I/O system", providing a generic framework for filesystems and device drivers. Very basic screen window functionality was also provided. This, and several other features, were never fully implemented in the released versions of QDOS, but were improved in later extensions to the operating system produced by Tebby's own company, QJUMP.

Rewritten, enhanced versions of QDOS were also developed, including Laurence Reeves' Minerva and Tebby's SMS2 and SMSQ/E. The last is the most modern variant and is still being improved.

== Versions ==
QDOS versions were identified by numerical version numbers. However, the QL firmware ROMs as a whole (including SuperBASIC) were given two- or three-letter alphabetic identifiers (returned by the SuperBASIC function VER$).

The following version of QDOS were released (dates are estimated first customer shipments):

- 0.08: the last pre-production version.
- 1.00: corresponded to the FB version QL ROMs, released in April 1984.
- 1.01: corresponded to the PM version ROMs. This was faster and had improved Microdrive support.
- 1.02: corresponded to the AH ROM version released in June 1984. This fixed many bugs and was the first ROM version to be produced in quantity.
- 1.03: included in ROM versions JM and TB; a minor bug-fix release issued in late 1984.
- 1.10: corresponded to the JS and JSU (US export version) ROMs, released in early 1985. This was the last version used in QLs manufactured for the UK market.
- 1.13: corresponding to the MGx series of ROM versions for European export markets. Included a significant number of bug fixes. The following localised versions of the MG firmware are known to exist:
  - MGE: Spanish
  - MGF: French
  - MGG: German
  - MGI: Italian
  - MGS: Swedish

The localised versions of QDOS were identified by the "." in the version number being replaced by the ROM version suffix letter used to identify the territory, e.g. the MGE ROMs contained QDOS version 1E13. All MG firmware versions shared the same bottom 32 KB ROM chip. Qdos 1.13 was also reported to be included in a Greek localised ROM version, known as ΣFP (marked on the ROMs as EFP).
