= GST Computer Systems =

Group of computer companies based in Cambridge

- Type: Private
- Founded: June 1979; 47 years ago
- Founder: Jeff Fenton
- Defunct: 2012
- Fate: Liquidation
- Headquarters: Cambridge, England
- Subsidiaries: GST Professional Services; GST Software Products; GST Training Centre; Electric Software

GST was a group of computer companies based in Cambridge, England, founded by Jeff Fenton in June 1979. The company worked with Atari, Sinclair Research, Torch Computers, Acorn Computers, Monotype Corporation and Kwik-Fit, amongst others.

The group included:

- GST Computer Systems: the original name of the company.
- GST Professional Services: a software consultancy that was sold and became OTIB A.T.
- GST Software Products: produced retail software, most notably Timeworks Publisher.
- GST Training Centre: a class based software training provider in Cambridgeshire, UK.
- Electric Software: a games software label, producing titles for home computers such as the Commodore 64, ZX Spectrum, and MSX-compatible models in the early 1980s.

GST Computer Systems started as a contract software development company. In 1983, it became involved with Sinclair Research, producing the 68K/OS operating system (later rejected by Sinclair) and development software for the Sinclair QL. In 1985 it was approached by Atari Corporation to port products from the QL on to the just to be launched Atari ST. The word processing package 1st Word was bundled with every Atari ST for the first two years of its life and GST became the leading software supplier for the Atari ST platform.

In 1987 GST developed its first desktop publishing application, Timeworks Publisher. This was sold in the US by Timeworks, Inc. (a Chicago based software publisher) as Publish-It!. This product went on to become the world-leading budget DTP product until competition from Microsoft Publisher in 1993 caused the eventual demise of Timeworks, Inc. The product was sold under new names including NEBS PageMagic (changed after objections from Adobe), Macmillan Publisher, Canon Publisher, and many other brands, distinguished by use of the .DTP file extension. The latest version was sold as Greenstreet Publisher 4 and is downwards file compatible with earlier versions.

In 2001 GST merged with eGames Europe as a new company, Greenstreet Software, developing and publishing computer software for Windows operating systems. In July 2008 the company was reconstructed and traded as Greenstreet Online Limited.

In November 2012, Greenstreet Online Limited was declared insolvent, and went into voluntary liquidation.

== See also ==
- GEM/5
