= Timeworks =

Defunct American software company

Timeworks International, Inc.
- Formerly: Softworks, Inc. (1982); Timeworks, Inc. (1982–1993)
- Type: Private
- Industry: Software
- Founded: 1982; 44 years ago in Deerfield, Illinois, United States
- Founder: Mark L. Goldberg
- Defunct: 1994; 32 years ago
- Fate: Acquired in 1993; folded in 1994
- Headquarters: Northbrook, Illinois, United States (1992–1994)
- Number of employees: 100 (1988, peak)
- Parent: Megalode Resources, Inc. (1994)

Timeworks, Inc., later Timeworks International, Inc., was a private American software publisher active from 1982 to 1994 and based in Chicago, Illinois. The company primarily sold entry-level productivity software, as well as advanced desktop publishing applications and video games. They are perhaps best known for Publisher (later known as Publish-It!), their flagship desktop publishing application. In 1993, they were acquired by Megalode Resources, Inc., of Burlington, Ontario, who operated the company until 1994.

== History ==
=== Foundation (1982–1984) ===
Timeworks, Inc., was founded in 1982 in Deerfield, Illinois, by Mark L. Goldberg (c. 1927–2006). The company was originally founded to develop software for the Timex Sinclair 1000, an inexpensive home computer introduced in the summer of 1982. Goldberg had been a veteran of the merchandising industry before founding Timeworks, with a self-professed lack of knowledge in computing. Before having any products in the market, the company's vice president Vic Schiller constructed a number of mock-up packages emblazoned with the name Softworks, the original name for the company. Schiller soon learned that another company located in Chicago was trading with that exact name, however, and wanting to keep the company's name the same length, the company quickly reincorporated itself as Timeworks.

Goldberg initially kept their staff lean, having only five people on Timeworks' payroll in 1983 (including Goldberg, Schiller, and Schiller's wife). Instead, Goldberg preferred to strike deals with freelance software developers, both in and out of state, giving them royalties for their software. As an example, two of the company's first video games, Star Battle and Dungeon of the Algebra Dragons, were developed by a 17-year-old programmer based in Chicago. Marketing and advertising, meanwhile, was outsourced to Brand Advertising (later Albert J. Rosenthal & Co.) of Chicago.

During the first couple of years of its existence, Timeworks focused exclusively on software for Commodore computers, namely the Commodore 64. One of Timeworks' first titles was Cave of the Word Wizard (1982), an educational video game that featured an early instance of speech synthesis for a home computer. The title was aimed at students with special needs and emphasized inflection and tone, as well as grammar.

=== Growth (1984–1993) ===
Within less than two years, Timeworks had roughly 15 productivity software and video game titles in its catalog, including Electronic Checkbook, Money Manager, Data Manager, and Swiftax, as well as the aforementioned video games. Swiftax, one of the first tax filing applications for the Commodore 64, was developed by a couple of out-of-state programmers in Houston, Texas, and quickly became one of Timeworks' best-selling titles for 1983 and 1984. Sales accordingly doubled, from US$2.3 million in 1983 to $4.4 million in 1984. It was in the latter year that Timeworks began expanding in earnest, Goldberg hiring Vic Schiller to head a team to convert Timeworks' existing software library to other platforms, including the Apple II, the IBM Personal Computer, and the Atari 8-bit computers. As well, Goldberg hired a television screenwriter to write and simplify the company's paper and online documentation for their software.

In late 1984, Timeworks licensed Evelyn Wood's speed reading software from her company, Evelyn Wood Reading Dynamics, releasing the Evelyn Wood Dynamic Reader for multiple platforms. In the same year, Timeworks released Word Writer, their first word processor software package, for multiple platforms. Word Writer sold well in the home office segment and was generally praised by software critics, especially its Atari ST version released in 1986. That version was based on the GEM desktop environment developed by Digital Research and was one of the first word processors for the Atari ST.

Timeworks continued to broadly support the Atari ST with productivity such as Data Manager ST (a database management system) and SwiftCalc ST (a spreadsheet application). This was at a time when the Atari ST's marketshare in the United States was rather poor, especially compared to that of the IBM PC (and its compatibles). Word Writer 128, released in the same year as the ST version, was one of the few programs written exclusively for the Commodore 128, which also suffered poor adoption rates in the United States. With the IBM PC market still ever-growing, however, Timeworks began focusing their attention to that platform starting in 1987.

Timeworks replicated their success with the GEM desktop environment with Publish-It! for the IBM PC and Apple IIGS. Released in 1988, it was an adaptation of their earlier Desktop Publisher for the Atari ST, which was not based on GEM. The software was positively compared to Ventura Publisher by software critics and was a best-seller for Timeworks. Later, Timeworks developed versions of Publish-It! for Mac OS and Windows platforms, under the names Publish-It! Easy and Publish-It! for Windows respectively. Timeworks abandoned GEM for these ports, as the built-in GUIs of Mac OS and Windows made a desktop environment like GEM running atop these redundant.

Timeworks' sales rose from $9.4 million in 1987 to a peak of $10.1 million in 1988. Employment in the company also peaked that year, Timeworks having 100 on its payroll. Sales hovered around the $9 million mark between 1989 and 1991 before reaching a new peak of $10.7 million in 1992. That year, the company moved their headquarters from Deerfield to Northbrook.

=== Acquisition and bankruptcy (1993–1994) ===
In 1993, Timeworks was acquired by Megalode Resources, Inc., of Burlington, Ontario, for an undisclosed sum. The acquisition was finalized in early 1994, the company renamed to Timeworks International and made a subsidiary of Megalode. They continued producing software until fall 1994, when Timeworks International went bankrupt and its entire staff was laid off.
