= ZX Microdrive =

Data storage cartridge format

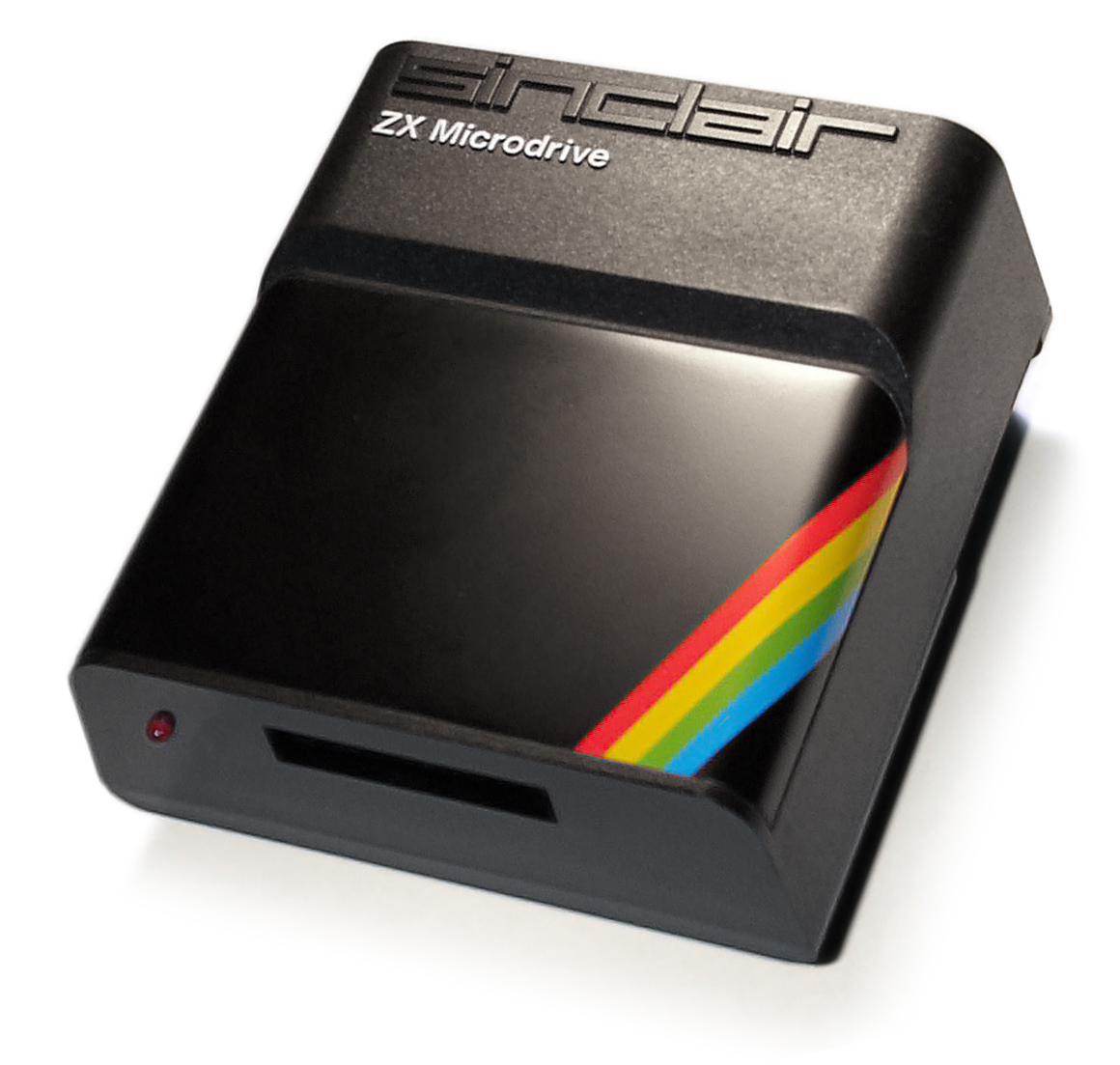
ZX Microdrive unit

The ZX Microdrive is a magnetic-tape data storage system launched in July 1983 by Sinclair Research for its ZX Spectrum home computer. It was proposed as a faster-loading alternative to the cassette and cheaper than a floppy disk, but it suffered from poor reliability and lower speed.

Microdrives used tiny cartridges containing a 5-metre (200 in) endless loop of magnetic tape, which held a minimum of 85 KB and performed a complete circuit in approximately eight seconds.

The Microdrive technology was later also used in the Sinclair QL and ICL One Per Desk personal computers.

== Development ==
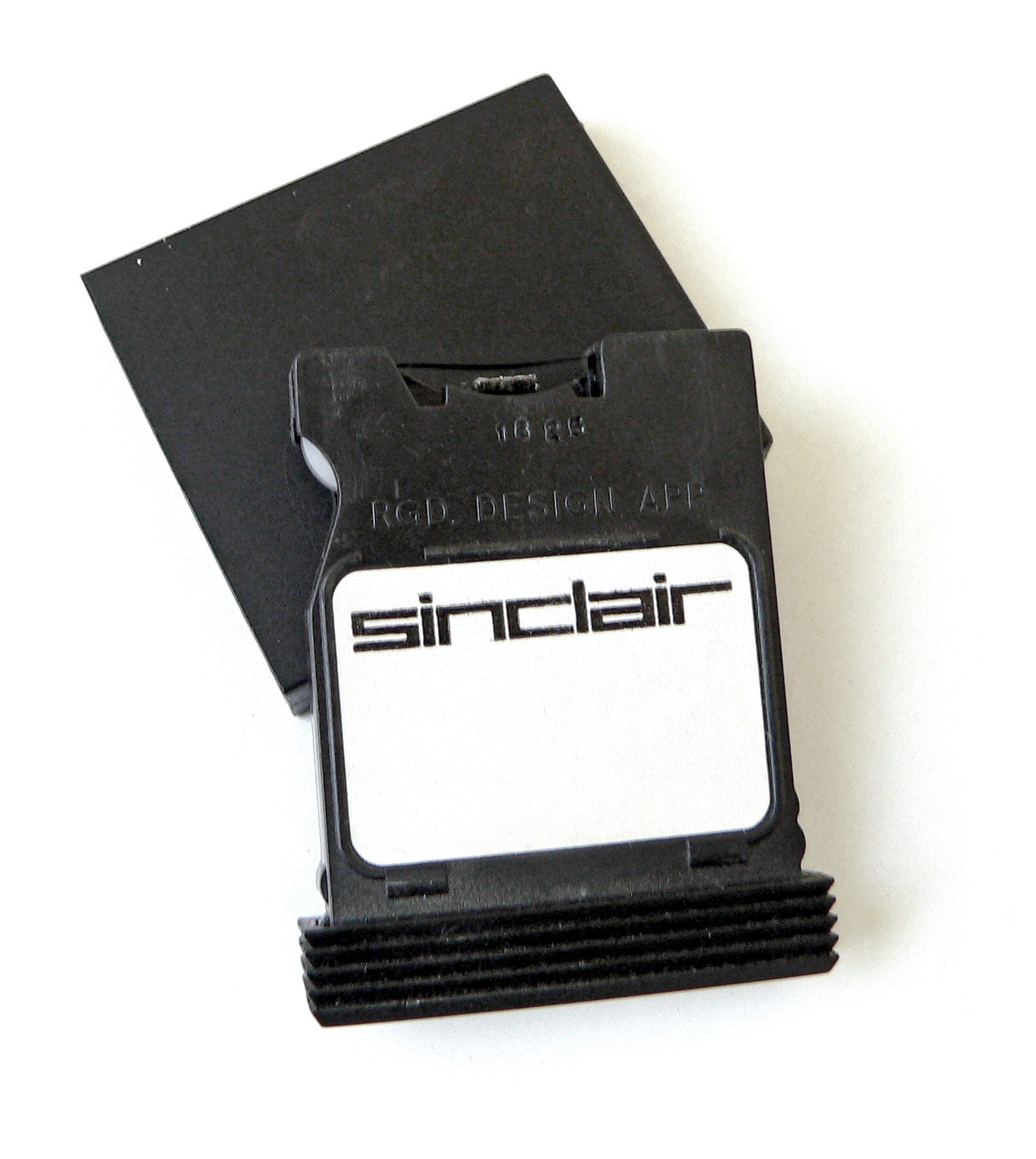
Microdrive cartridge with case

It is claimed the Microdrive concept was originally suggested by Andrew Grillet at an interview with Sinclair Research in 1974. Grillet was offered a better-paying job at Xerox, and never worked for Sinclair Research. Development of the ZX Microdrive hardware by Sinclair engineers Jim Westwood, David Southward and Ben Cheese started in 1982.

== Products ==
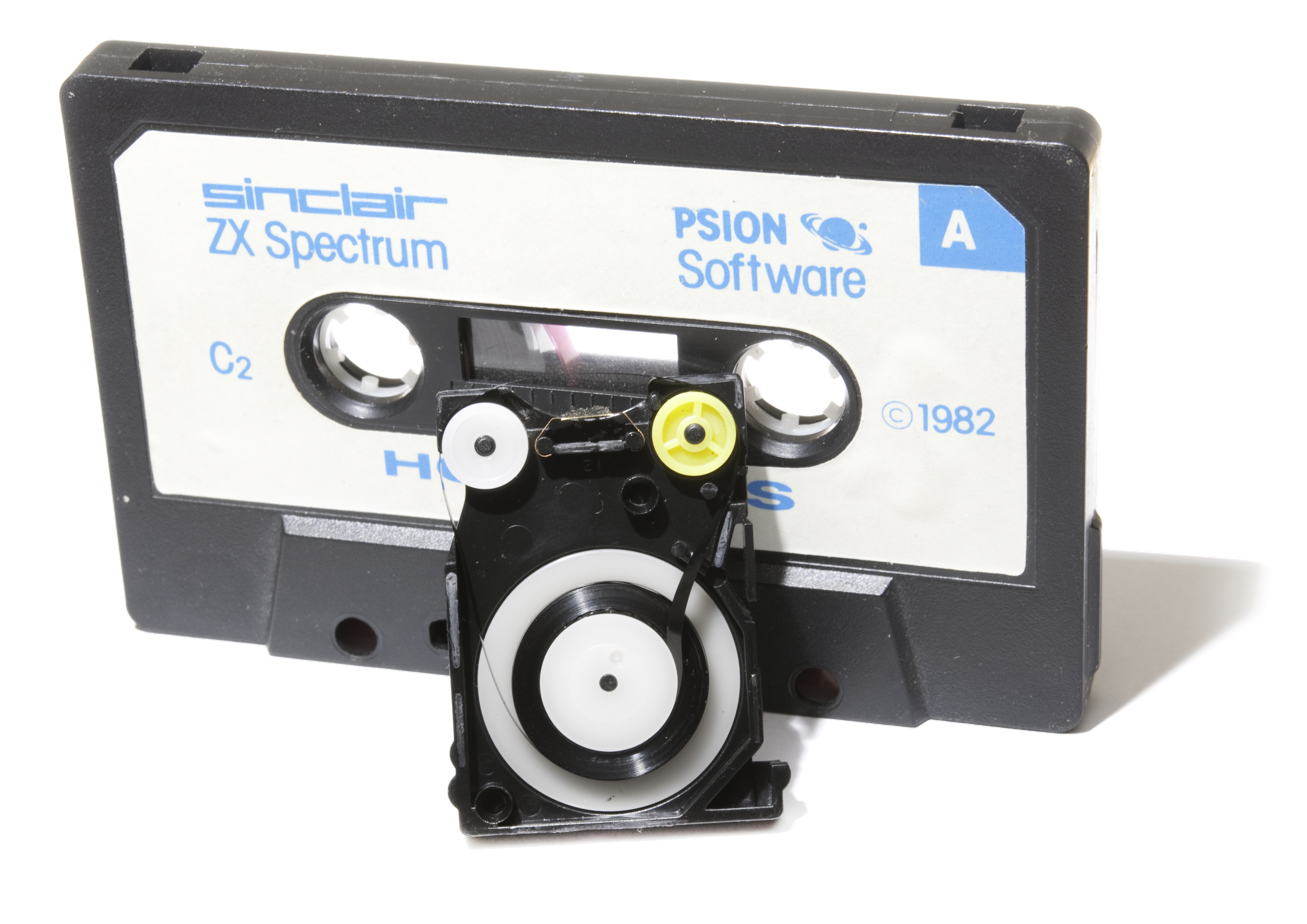
Opened microdrive cartridge, with a cassette tape for comparison

The Microdrive was comparatively cheap (£49.95 at launch) and technologically innovative but also rather limited. Connecting a ZX Microdrive to a ZX Spectrum required the ZX Interface 1 unit, costing £49.95, although this could be bought packaged with a Microdrive for £79.95. Later, in March 1985, the ZX Spectrum Expansion System was launched for £99.95. This consisted of Interface 1, a Microdrive, a blank cartridge and several cartridges containing Tasword Two (a word processor), Masterfile (a database), Quicksilva's Games Designer and Ant Attack games, and an introductory cartridge.

== Technology ==
Microdrives use tiny (44 mm × 34 mm × 8 mm (1.73 in × 1.34 in × 0.31 in) including protective cover) cartridges containing a 5-metre (200 in) endless loop of magnetic tape, 1.9 mm (0.075 in) wide, driven at 76 cm/s (30 in/s); thus performing a complete circuit in approximately 8 seconds. The cartridges hold a minimum of 85 KB when formatted on a ZX Microdrive (exact capacity depended on the number of bad sectors found and the precise speed of the Microdrive motor when formatting). The data retrieval rate is 15 KB/s, i.e., 120 kbit/s. It is possible to "expand" the capacity of a fresh microdrive cartridge by formatting it several times. This causes the tape to stretch slightly, increasing the length of the tape loop, so that more sectors can be marked out on it. This procedure was widely documented in the Sinclair community magazines of the 1980s. The operating system automatically marks bad sectors during formatting, so storage capacity decreases over time.

A total of eight ZX Microdrive units can be connected to the Interface 1 by daisy chaining one drive to the next via an electrical connector block.

The system acquired a reputation for unreliability, with tapes experiencing excessive wear because of friction. Sinclair stated that improved manufacturing fixed the problem, but BYTE reported that two of 11 QL tapes failed during testing. The tapes stretch during use (giving them a short life span), eventually rendering the data stored unreadable. The "write protection" is software-based; a computer crash can erase the data on an entire tape in 8 seconds. The cartridges were relatively expensive (initially sold for £4.95 each, later reduced to £1.99).

== Later uses ==
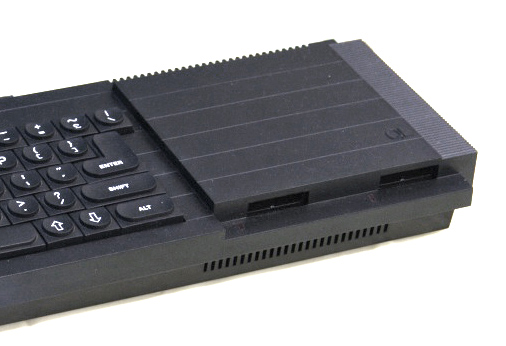
The Sinclair QL featured dual internal Microdrives

Microdrives are also the native storage medium of the Sinclair QL, which incorporate two internal drives. These are very similar to the ZX Microdrive, but use a different logical format, allowing each cartridge to hold at least 100 KB. Mechanically the drives are similar, but run slightly slower and have a take-up acceleration start instead of the instant start of the ZX Spectrum drives, putting less strain on the cartridges. The QL also included a Microdrive expansion bus, allowing the attachment of up to six external QL Microdrives. These were never produced, probably due to lack of demand. It is possible to connect ZX Microdrives to a QL by putting a twist in the cable.

In addition to the QL versions, dual internal Microdrives were included in the related ICL One Per Desk system (also badged as the Merlin Tonto and Telecom Australia Computerphone). These drives were re-engineered by ICL for greater reliability, and use a format incompatible with both ZX and QL Microdrives.

== See also ==
- Rotronics Wafadrive
- Stringy floppy
