= SuperBASIC =

Sinclair QL variant of the BASIC programming language

- Developer(s): Sinclair Research, Jan Jones
- Initial release: 1984; 41 years ago
- Operating system: QDOS
- Platform: Sinclair QL microcomputer
- Type: second-generation BASIC
- License: Proprietary

SuperBASIC is an advanced variant of the BASIC programming language with many structured programming additions. It was developed at Sinclair Research by Jan Jones during the early 1980s.

Originally SuperBASIC was intended as the BASIC interpreter for a home computer code-named SuperSpectrum, then under development. This project was later cancelled; however, SuperBASIC was subsequently included in the ROM firmware of the Sinclair QL microcomputer (announced in January 1984), also serving as the command line interpreter for the QL's QDOS operating system.

It was one of the first second-generation BASICs to be integrated into a microcomputer's operating system (unlike BBC BASIC which preceded it in 1981), making the OS user-extendable—as done by Linus Torvalds in his formative years.

== Reception ==
BYTE in September 1984 approved of SuperBASIC's improvements over Sinclair BASIC but criticized its "very, very slow" performance on the Byte Sieve, writing that "With a 7.5-MHz 68008, you'd think it would take some effort to get a language to run that slowly". The magazine also noted that SuperBASIC's seven-digit precision made it unsuitable for business use ("you can represent numbers far larger than the number of quarks in the universe, but not the pennies on your balance sheet if your turnover exceeds £99,000").

== Advanced features ==
- RESPR for resident procedures, e.g. to extend QDOS
- choice of parameters passed to procedures
- procedures return parameters as chosen
- IF - THEN - ELSE - END IF
- FOR - NEXT - EXIT - END FOR
- REPeat - NEXT - EXIT - END REPeat
- SELect ON - ON - REMAINDER - END SELect
- arbitrarily RETurn from within procedures & functions
- data type coercion between numeric and string variables
- actual parameters passing data type to formal parameters
- array operations: slicing, joining etc.
- LOCal arrays & (string) variables
- AUTOmatic line numbering
- relative RESTORE & DATA

The function below illustrates the last eight of these features. After having RUN it, entering

      PRINT weekdays$(Iso("19631122",1))

will print FRI to the screen. Until cleared (e.g. by entering NEW), the function Iso will act like an extension to the operating system. Similarly, according to the QL User Guide, "many of the operating system commands are themselves defined as procedures."

== Example ==
AUTO 11,2

  DEFine FN Iso(S,O)
  LOCal y%,m%,d%,i$,n%,w%

  REM Step 0 - to isolate components of date-stamp S="YEARMoDa"
  LET y%=S(1TO 4) : m%=S(5TO 6) : d%=S(7TO 8)

  REM Step 1 - to initiate Lachman's Congruence[6]
  LET i$=m%*2.56+ 193 : S=S(1TO 6)- 3

  REM Step 2 - to compute the day-number within the week
  LET w%=(S(1TO 2)&"32"DIV 16+ S(1TO 4)DIV 4+ y%+ i$(2TO 3)+ d%)MOD 7
 
  REM Step 3 - to return result
         SELect ON O
                ON O= 5 : n%=i$(2TO 3)
                ON O= 4 : n%=y%
                ON O= 3 : n%=m%
                ON O= 2 : n%=d%
                ON O= 1 : n%=w%
                ON O= REMAINDER : n%=-1
         END SELect
  RETurn n%

  REM data statements
  DIM weekdays$(6,3)
  RESTORE 190
  FOR count=0 TO 6 : READ weekdays$(count)

ctrl+space

 100 DIM month$(12,9)
 110 RESTORE 
 120 REM QL User Guide's "Data Read Restore" example ii
 130 REM appropriately amended relative to example i
 140 FOR count=1 TO 12 : READ month$(count) 
 150 DATA "January","February","March"
 160 DATA "April","May","June"
 170 DATA "July","August","September"
 180 DATA "October","November","December"
 190 DATA "SUN","MON","TUE","WED","THU","FRI","SAT"
 199 END DEFine Iso

== Bibliography ==
- Donald Alcock: Illustrating Superbasic on the Sinclair QL. Cambridge University Press, 1985. ISBN 0-521-31517-4
- Roy Atherton: Good Programming with QL Superbasic. Longman Software, 1984. ISBN 0-582-29662-5
- A. A. Berk: QL SuperBasic. Granada Publishing, 1984. ISBN 0-246-12596-9
- "Illustrating Superbasic on the Sinclair QL - World of Spectrum". www.worldofspectrum.org.
- Jan Jones: QL SuperBasic: The Definitive Handbook. McGraw-Hill, 1984 ISBN 0070847843 (e-book reissue 2014)
- Dick Meadows, Robin Bradbeer, Nigel Searle: Introduction to Superbasic on the Sinclair QL. Hutchinson Computer Publishing, 1984. ISBN 0-09-158951-7
- Dick Meadows, Robin Bradbeer, Nigel Searle: Making the Most of the Sinclair QL: QL Superbasic and Its Applications. Hutchinson Computer Publishing, 1985. ISBN 0-09-160561-X
- Andrew Nelson: Exploring the Sinclair QL: An Introduction to SuperBasic. Interface Publications, 1984. ISBN 0-907563-84-8
- John K. Wilson: QL Superbasic: A Programmer's Guide. Micro Press, 1984. ISBN 0-7447-0020-5
