= Motorola 68008 =

Microprocessor

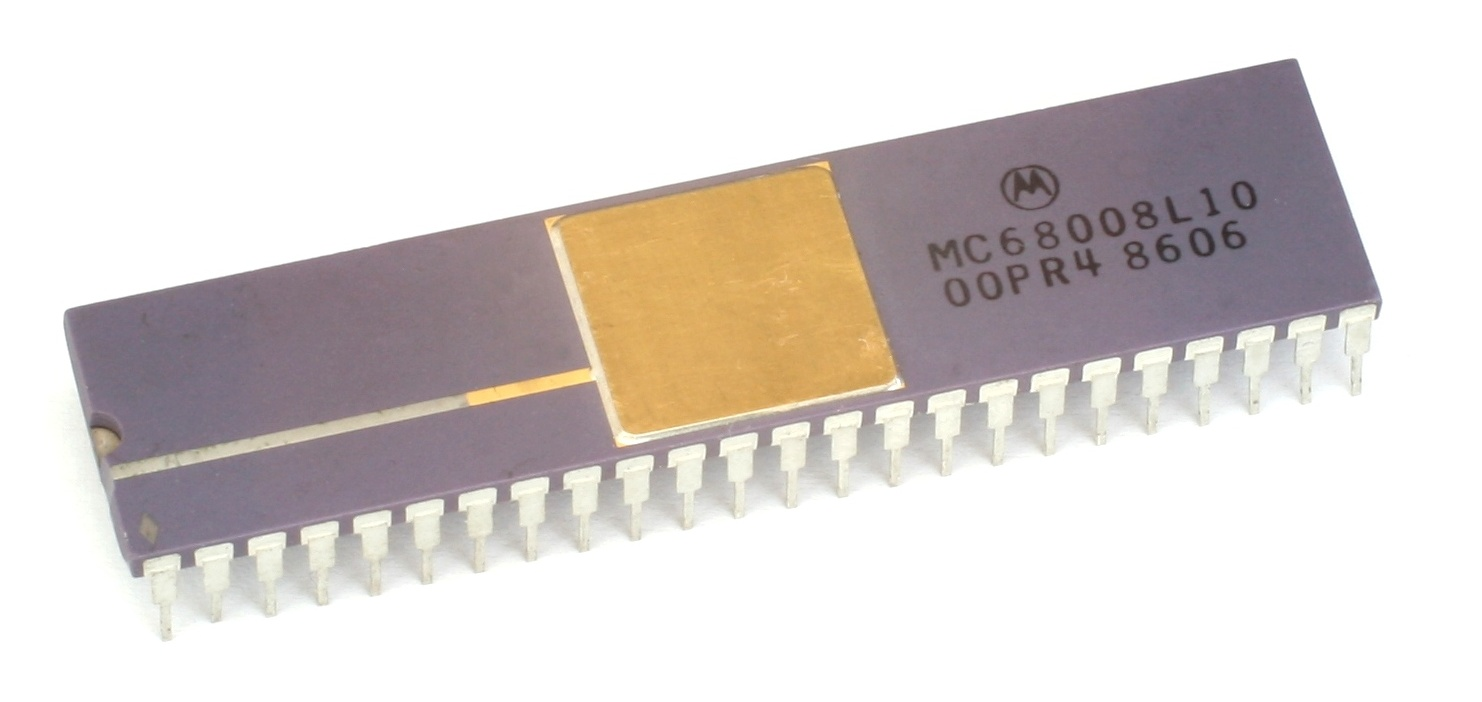
Motorola MC68008

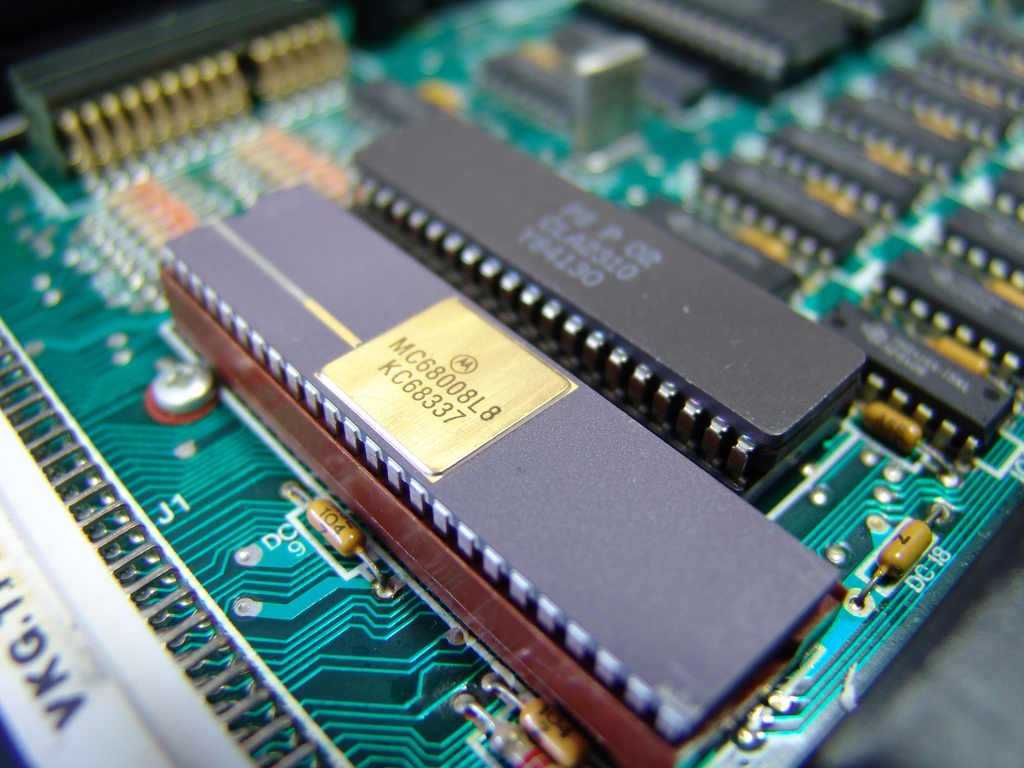
68008 in a Sinclair QL motherboard

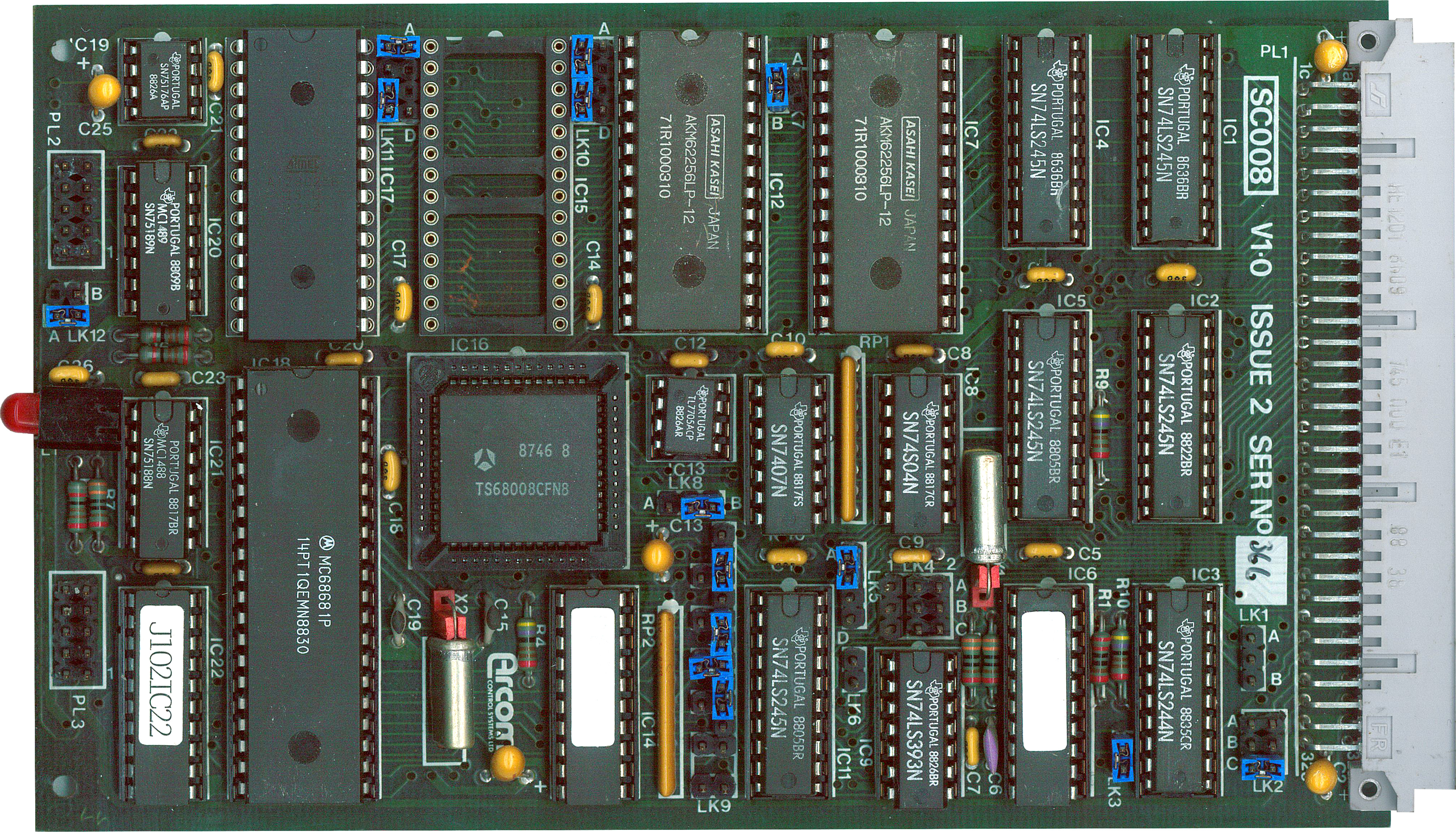
STEbus 68008 processor

The Motorola 68008 is a microprocessor introduced by Motorola in 1982. It is a version of 1979's Motorola 68000 with an 8-bit external data bus, as well as a smaller address bus. The 68008 was available with 20 or 22 address lines (in a 48-pin or 52-pin package, respectively) which allowed 1 MB or 4 MB address space versus the 16 MB addressable on the 68000. The 68008 was designed to work with lower cost and simpler 8-bit memory systems. Because of its smaller data bus, it was roughly half as fast as a 68000 of the same clock speed. (Note: Manual shows almost exactly double the 68000 clocks for every non-memory-byte operation except MUL/DIV.) It was still faster than competing 8-bit microprocessors, because internally the 68008 behaves identically to the 68000 and has the same microarchitecture.

Motorola ended production of the 68008 in 1996.

== Details ==
The 68008 is an HMOS chip with about 70,000 transistors; with a speed grade of 8 and 10 MHz. There are two versions of the chip. The original is in a 48-pin dual in-line package with a 20-bit address bus, allowing it to use up to 1 megabyte of memory. A later version is in a 52-pin plastic leaded chip carrier; this version has a 22-bit address bus and can support 4 megabytes of RAM.

== Usages ==
The Sinclair QL microcomputer and Luxor ABC 1600 use the 68008 as their main processor.
