= Playback =

Playback or Play Back may refer to:

== Film ==
- Playback (1962 film), a British film in the Edgar Wallace Mysteries series
- Playback, a 1996 film starring Shannon Whirry
- Playback (2012 film), an American horror film by Michael A. Nickles
- Play Back, a 2021 Indian Telugu-language film
- Playback (2019 film), an Argentine documentary

== Literature ==
- Playback (magazine), a Canadian film, TV, and new media trade publication
- Playback (novel), by Raymond Chandler, also a screenplay

== Music ==
- Gapless playback, uninterrupted play of audio tracks
- Playback singer, a singer in films whose singing is prerecorded, who lip syncs (see also lip-synching in music)

=== Performers ===
- Playback (South Korean group), a girl group
- Playback, an American boyband that competed in season 2 of the U.S. X Factor
- Playback, credited performers in the U.S. of the 1979 Player One song "Space Invaders"

=== Albums ===
- Playback (The Appletree Theatre album), 1968
- Playback (Phi Life Cypher album), 2006
- Playback (Sam Lazar album), 1962
- Playback (SSQ album), 1983
- Playback (Tom Petty and the Heartbreakers album), 1995
- Playback: The Brian Wilson Anthology, 2017

=== Songs ===
- "Playback", by Carlos Paião, representing Portugal at the Eurovision Song Contest 1981
- "Playback", by NCT 127 from 2 Baddies, 2022
- "Playback", by Loona from Flip That, 2022

== Other uses ==
- Playback (technique), a chaos magic technique
- Playback attack, or replay attack, a type of network attack
- Playback FM, a fictional radio station in the video game Grand Theft Auto: San Andreas
- Playback Theatre, a form of improvisational theatre

== See also ==
- Record (disambiguation)
- Replay (disambiguation)
