= Megamax C =

Megamax C is a K&R C-based development system originally written for the Mac and ported to the Atari ST and Apple IIGS computers. Sold by Megamax, Inc., based in Richardson, Texas, the package includes a one-pass compiler, linker, text editor, resource construction kit, and documentation. Megamax C was written by Michael Bunnell with Eric Parker providing the linker and most of the standard library. A circa-1988 version of the compiler was renamed Laser C, while the company remained Megamax.

In the early days of the Atari ST, Megamax C was the primary competitor to the Alcyon C compiler from Digital Research included in the official developer kit from Atari Corporation, and the documentation covers Atari-specific features. The company advertised that Megamax C could be used on a 520 ST with a single floppy drive. The ST version includes the executable and assets for Megaroids, a clone of the Asteroids video game, written by Mike Bunnell with sound effects by Mitch Bunnell.

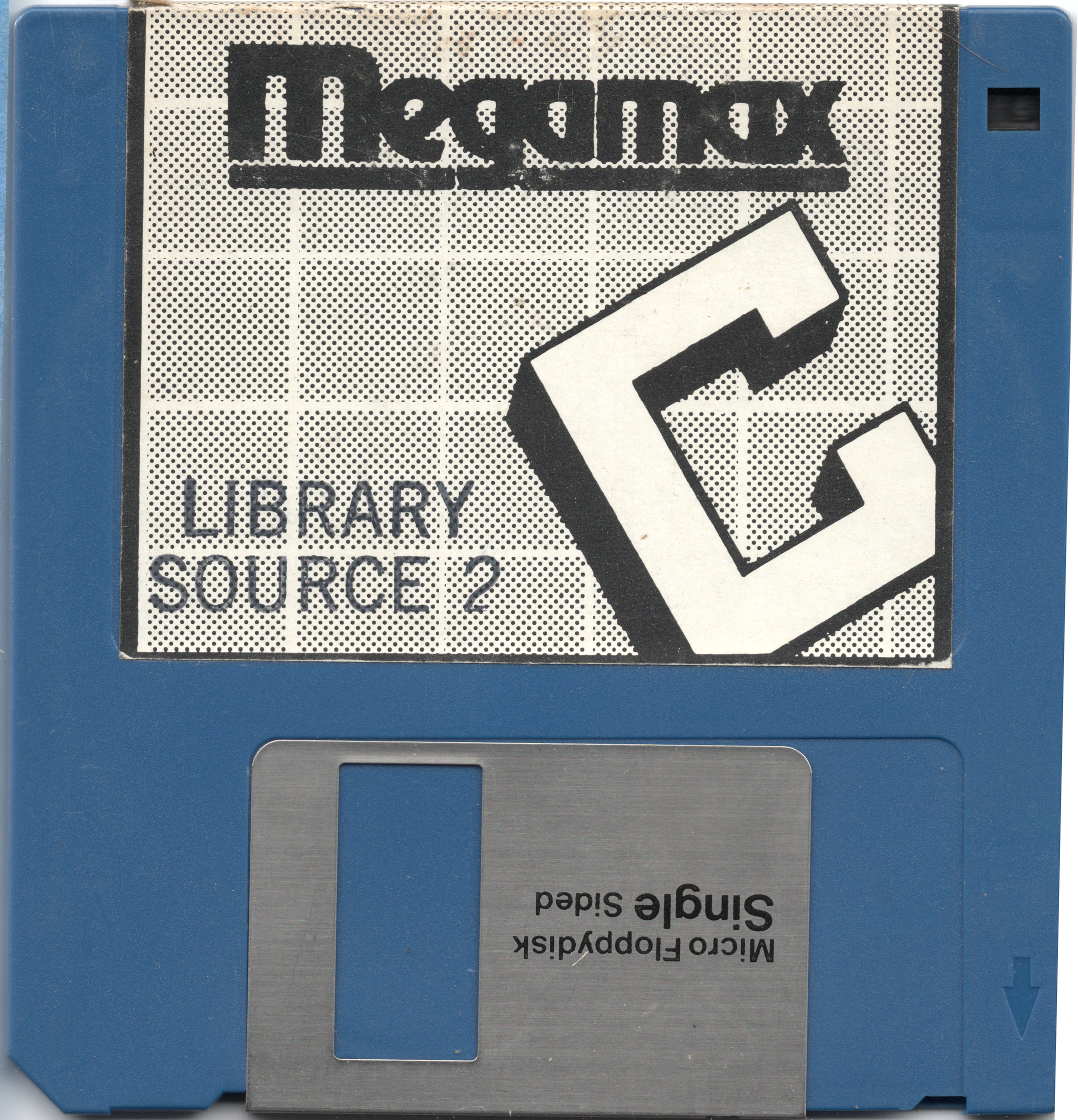
Standard library source code disk for the Megamax C compiler for Macintosh.

== Technical details ==
On both the Atari ST and Macintosh, the size of a compiled module is limited to 32K of code, and arrays have the same 32K restriction. The limitation stems from a requirement on the Macintosh which was carried over to the Atari. This is despite the Motorola 68000 CPU in both machines having a 24-bit address range.

== Reception ==
According to a review of the Atari ST version in Antic by Mike Fleishman, Megamax C compiled a small benchmark program six times faster than Digital Research's compiler. In a comparison of C compilers for the Atari ST, STart magazine wrote, "For a development compiler, Megamax C is, without question, the best available on the Atari. It will reduce your compile/test turn-around time by at least a factor of five." They also pointed out that the $200 price may be steep for hobbyists and students.

The compiler was used for development by Batteries Included and FTL Games.
