= Replay =

Replay may refer to:

== Technology ==
- Game replay, a recording of a game session.
- Instant replay, in motion pictures and television, a showing again of part of a film
- Replay Professional, a hardware sound sampling device used by the atari ST
- ReplayTV, a digital video recorder (DVR)
- Replay attack, in cryptography, an attack involving insertion of a message that has been sent previously
- Replay system of NetBurst architecture microprocessors
- REPLAY (software), a management system for audiovisual content developed at ETH Zurich

== Books ==
- Replay (Grimwood novel), a 1986 science fiction novel by Ken Grimwood
- Replay (Creech novel), a 2005 book by Sharon Creech
- Replay: The History of Video Games, a 2010 book by Tristan Donovan
- RE:Play, a 2006 original English-language manga by Christy Lijewski

== Film and television ==
- Replay (2001 film), a 2001 French drama film
- Replay (2003 film), a 2003 film starring Rebecca Mader
- Replay (TV program), a Canadian sports talk show television series
- Replay (web series), a 2021 South Korean web drama
- Gatorade Replay, a Fox Sports Net series featuring alumni from two sports teams, who replay a notable game from their past
- "Replay", 2019 episode of the television series The Twilight Zone

== Music ==
=== Albums ===
- Replay (Crosby, Stills & Nash album), a 1980 album by the rock group Crosby, Stills & Nash
- Replay (Alison Brown album), a 2002 album by American banjoist Alison Brown
- Replay (Play album), a 2003 album by Swedish girl group Play
- Replay (Iyaz album), a 2010 album by British Virgin Island singer Iyaz
- Replay (The Outfield album), a 2011 album by English rock band The Outfield
- Rush Replay X 3, a 2006 set of filmed concerts from Rush
- Replay (EP), 2008 EP by South Korean boy band Shinee

=== Songs ===
- "Replay" (Iyaz song), a 2009 song by Iyaz
- "Replay" (Mr. Children song), a 1993 song by Japanese band Mr. Children
- "Replay" (Shinee song), a 2008 song by Shinee
- "Replay" (Tamta song), a 2019 song that represented Cyprus in the Eurovision Song Contest 2019
- "Replay" (Zendaya song), a 2013 song by Zendaya
- "Replay", a 1995 song by Millencolin from the album Life on a Plate
- "Replay", a 2013 song by Vamps from the single "Ahead/Replay"
- "Replay", a 2013 song by Lady Kash, remake of the 2009 Iyaz song
- "Replay", a 2017 song by Moka Only from the album Concert for One
- "Replay", a 2020 song by Lady Gaga from Chromatica
- "Replay", a 2021 song by Senidah
- "On Replay", a song by Bzikebi representing Georgia in the 2026 Eurovision Song Contest

== Other uses ==
- Replay (sports), a replayed match between two sport teams
- Replay pen, the brand name in Europe and Brazil for the Papermate Erasermate pen
