= Atari STacy =

Portable personal computer (1989-1991)

STacy
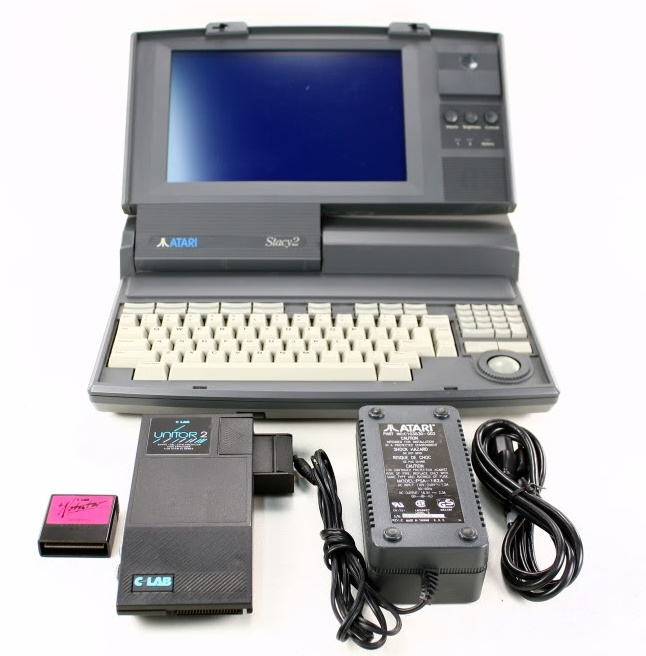
- Atari Stacy 2 portable computer with professional MIDI extension
- Manufacturer: Atari Corporation
- Released: September 1989; 36 years ago
- Introductory price: US$2,299 (equivalent to $5,830 in 2024)
- Discontinued: 1991
- Units shipped: estimated 35,000+
- Operating system: Atari TOS 1.04
- CPU: Motorola 68HC000 @ 8 MHz
- Memory: RAM: 1 MiB (expandable to 4 MiB); ROM: 192 KiB
- Storage: 3.5" floppy drive, 3.5" SCSI 20MB-40MB harddrive Conner Peripherals Inc.
- Display: 10.4" EPSON LCD passive matrix backlight
- Graphics: 320x200 (16), 640x200 (4), 640x400 (2)
- Sound: Yamaha YM-2149, three channels, 8 octaves
- Input: 95 keys, QWERTY, 2 Joysticks, RS 232C, Centronics, external Floppy, ROM-Cartridge, DMA for Printer/HD, MIDI In/Out, Monitor
- Power: NiCad pack, 12 standard C cell alkaline batteries, DC18V 2.0A 36W AC Adaptor
- Dimensions: 13.3 x 15 x 13.3 inches
- Weight: 15.2 lb (6,9 Kg)
- Successor: ST BOOK

The STacy is a portable computer version of the Atari ST.

The computer was originally designed to operate on 12 standard C cell flashlight batteries for portability. When Atari realized how quickly the machine would use up a set of batteries (especially when rechargeable batteries of the time supplied insufficient power compared to the intended alkalines), they simply glued the lid of the battery compartment shut.

The STacy has features similar to the Macintosh Portable, a version of Apple's Macintosh computer which contained a built in keyboard and monitor.

With built-in MIDI, the STacy enjoyed success for running music-sequencer software and as a controller of musical instruments among both amateurs and well-known musicians.

== History ==
The STacy was a global project, design work was carried out in the Sunnyvale HQ, Cambridge UK, final PCB layouts were produced by Atari in Japan, which is where the first units were manufactured, with final manufacturing occurring in Taiwan.

The distinctive sculptured charcoal-gray case was designed by Ira Velinsky, Atari's chief Industrial Designer.

== Models ==
There are four STacy models:

- Stacy: 1 MB RAM, 1× 3.5" internal floppy (Model code: LST-1141)
- Stacy 2: 2 MB RAM, 1× 3.5" internal floppy, 20 MB HD (Model code: LST-2144)
- Stacy 2: 2 MB RAM, 2× 3.5" internal floppy (Model code: LST-2124)
- Stacy 4: 4 MB RAM, 1× 3.5" internal floppy, 40 MB HD (Model code: LST-4144)

== Specifications ==
- Atari TOS 1.04 (Rainbow TOS)
- Blitter
- Character set: Atari ST character set (based on code page 437)
- Real-time clock lithium battery
- Hard disk: ACSI-SCSI 20-40 MB
- Floppy disk
- ACSI, ACSI internal (same as in Mega STE)
- Trackball

=== Ports ===
- Parallel: 1 port
- Serial: 1 port
- FDD: 1 port
- MIDI: 2 ports

=== Optional ===
- Modem

== In pop culture ==
The STacy appears in the 1991 films Nothing but Trouble and Delusion.

The STacy is used by Jimmy Urine of Mindless Self Indulgence.

== Gallery ==
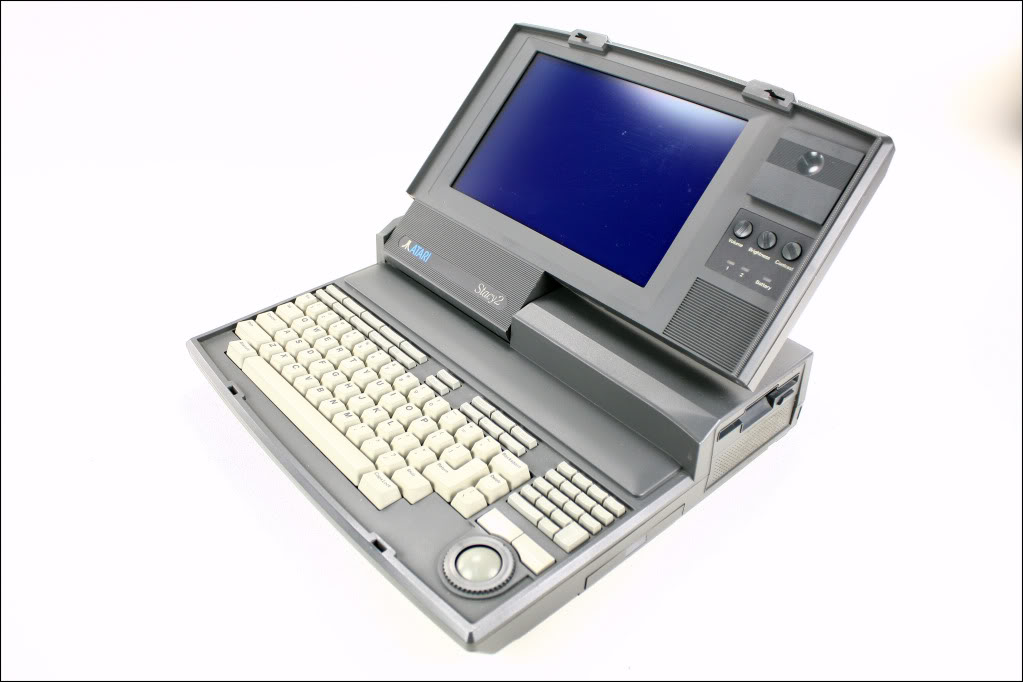

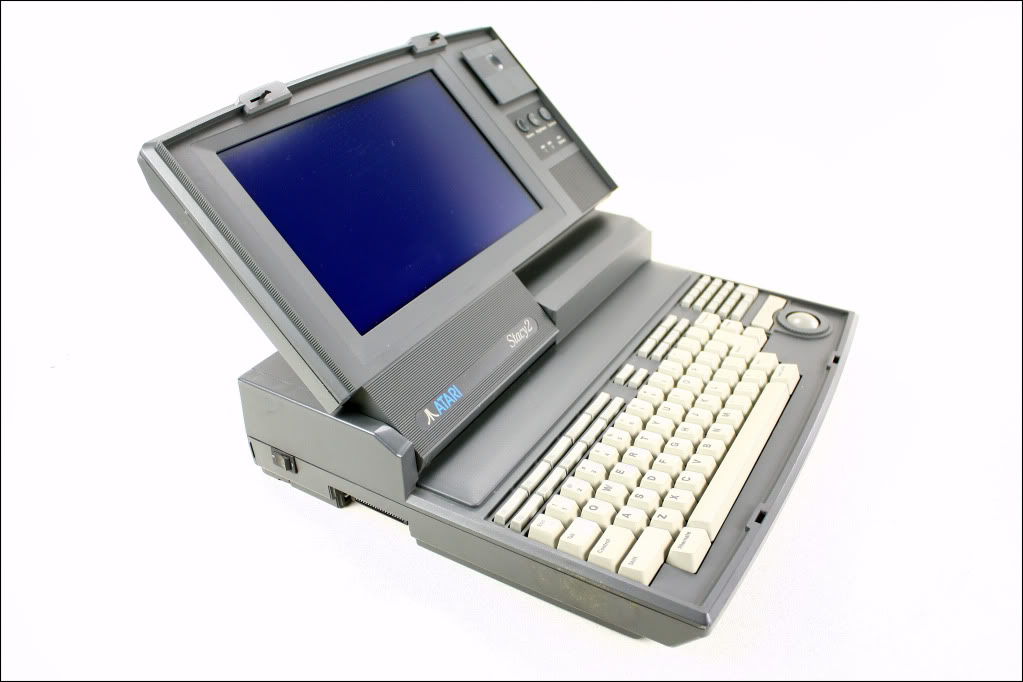

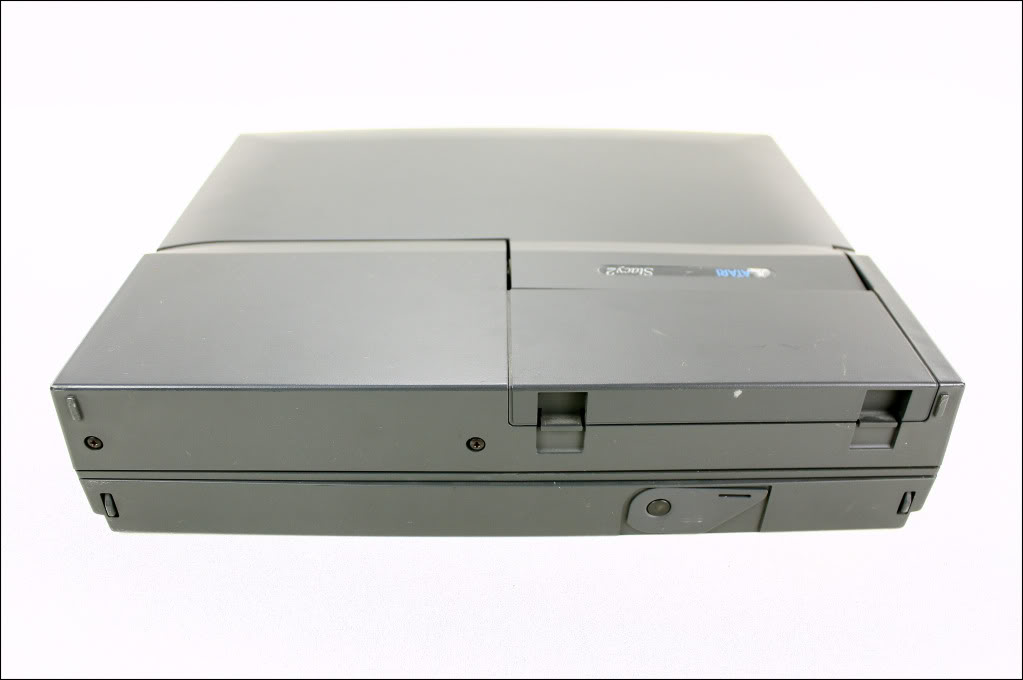

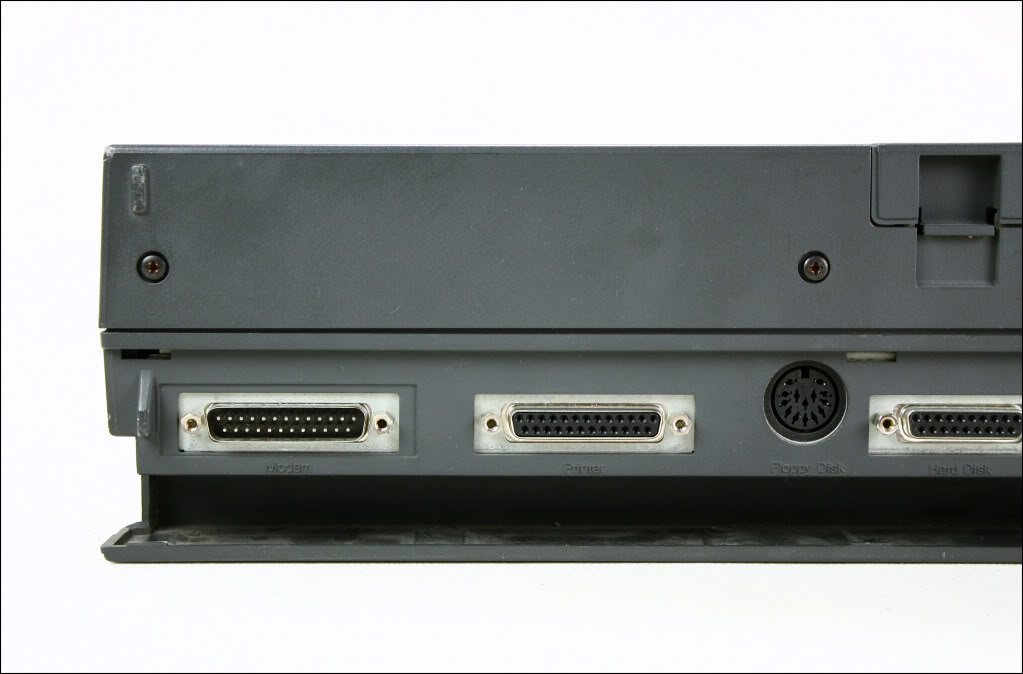

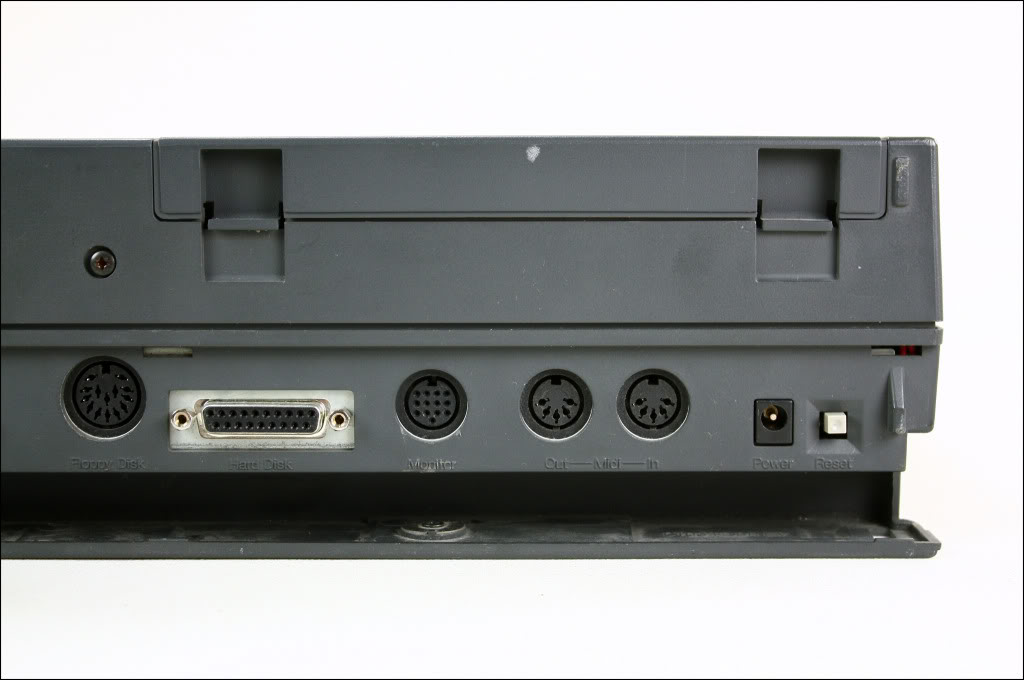

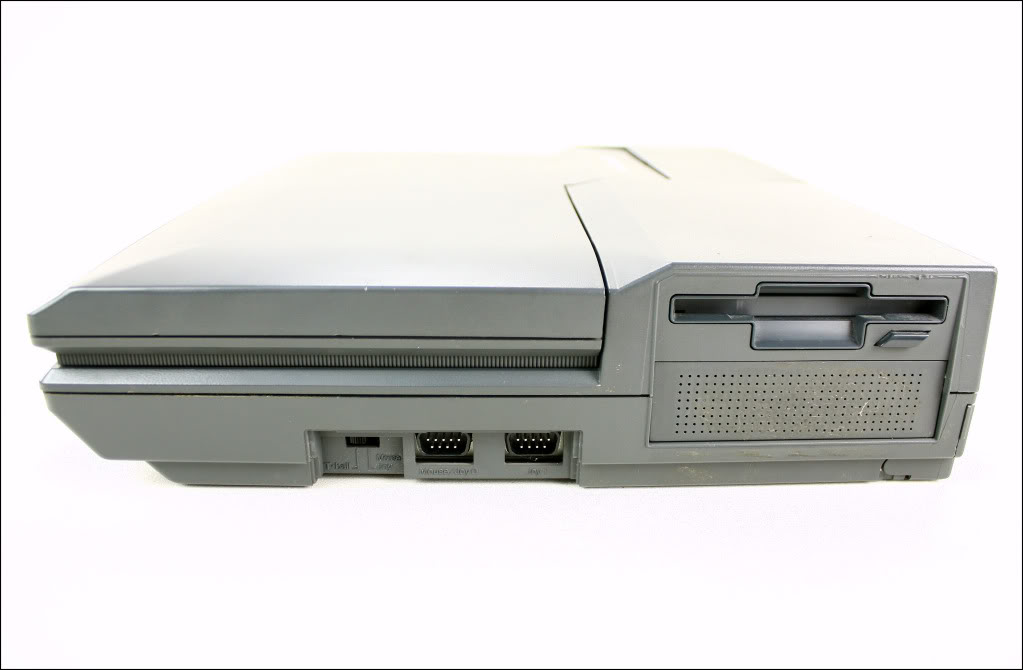

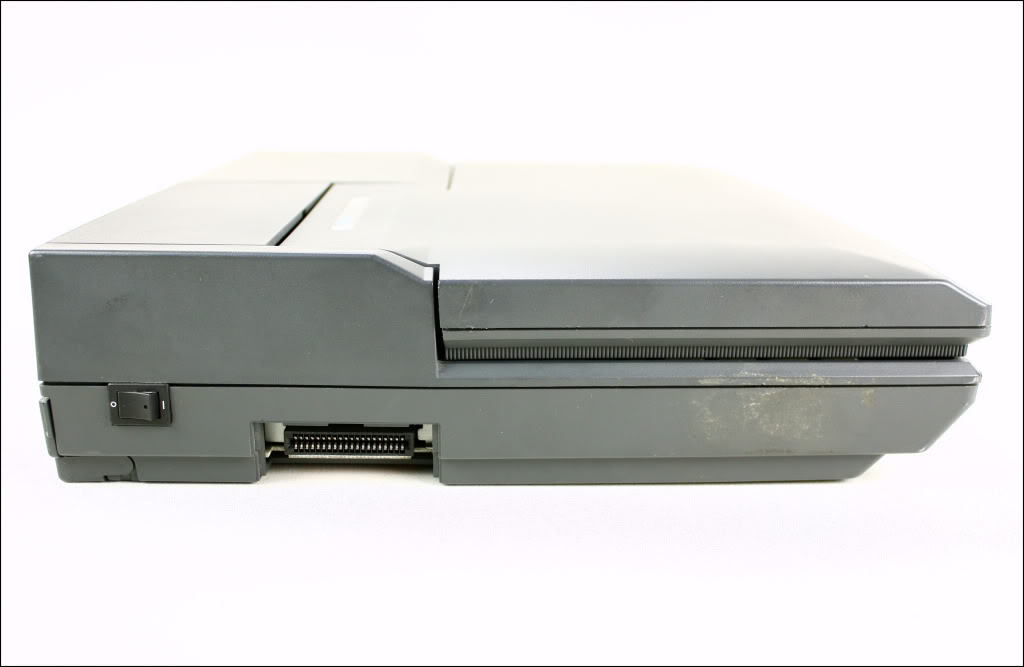

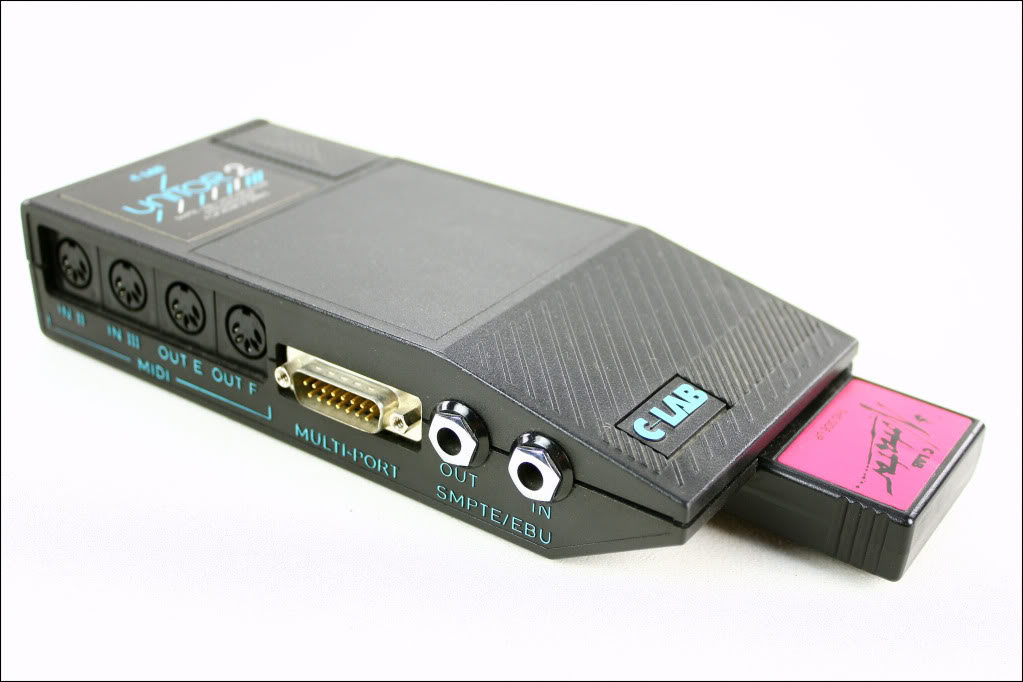
