= Oxyd =

1990 video game

- Developer: Meinolf Amekudzi
- Publisher: Dongleware Verlags GmbH
- Platforms: Atari ST, Amiga, MS-DOS, Macintosh, NeXT
- Release: 1990: Atari ST; 1992: Amiga, Mac, MS-DOS
- Genre: Puzzle
- Mode: Single-player

Oxyd is a 1990 puzzle video game developed for the Atari ST and ported to the Amiga, Macintosh, MS-DOS, and NeXT by Dongleware Verlags GmbH. It is a game of puzzles and tests to restart all the oxygen generators (called Oxyds) on the player's home planet. The Oxyds must be restarted by opening them in pairs of matching patterns, and (in colour versions) matching colours.

The Atari ST version was developed with the Megamax Modula-2 programming language.

== Gameplay ==
Oxyd is a sequel to a puzzle game called Esprit, where the player controls a small black marble that rolls around, touches things to activate them (Oxyds are opened by touching them), and bashes things to move them. The player has an inventory and can add some items to the inventory by rolling over them. The game's playfield is called a landscape. The player must open all the Oxyds to progress to the next landscape. Oxyds must be matched in pairs. An unpaired Oxyd will close if an Oxyd of another pattern or colour is opened.

Some landscapes also contain textual clues, which the player can place in their inventory by rolling the marble over them. They can then be selected and read. There are clues on many landscapes: some are helpful, but others are confusing or not so helpful. Other useful items include bombs, dynamite, spades, keys and computer disks. These items may be placed in the inventory, and can create or destroy blocks, create holes, fill holes, and open doors. There are other interactive blocks, including movable wooden blocks, lasers, mirrors, hidden passages. There are also dangerous areas, including bottomless pits, crumbling floors (which collapse if the marble has been rolled on them several times), slides, pools of water to drown in, quicksand (which the marble will slowly sink in), and assorted traps.

Some levels invert the player's controls, in later entries to the series, the player has to control several balls, which shatter if they touch each other.

There are two-player cooperative levels with one black and one white marble that can either be played by one player, alternating his mouse control between either marble, or by two players playing on two interconnected computers. The interconnection is accomplished by MIDI on the Atari ST, or by the serial ports on other machines.

== Release ==
Dongleware offered for $4 shipping and handling the first ten levels of Oxyd, and the game was easily obtainable from shareware CDs or bulletin board systems. From the 11th level onward, at various intervals throughout the games, "Magic Tokens" blocked crucial parts and passageways of the landscapes, mostly rendering progress impossible. These stones could only be removed by entering a code. The Oxyd Book was sold separately for $39, with code tables matching the information given on the Magic Stone. This form of software protection used the book as a dongle or code wheel, but unlike other games which use the code book protection approach, the game itself was free.

== Reception ==
Computer Gaming World in April 1993 called Oxyd "my favorite new shareware title ... an exceptional offering, guaranteed to provide numerous hours of enjoyment". The magazine in April 1994 said that Oxyd Magnum "will quickly pull players deeper and deeper into its 100 devilish mazes". Computer Gaming World in May 1994 said that it "is a game with very few flaws. The graphics are clean, and the mouse control is crisp", and praised the small size. The magazine concluded that "Oxyd Magnum is a top notch puzzle game that will keep players up to the early hours of the morning attempting to solve 'just one more level'".

== Legacy ==
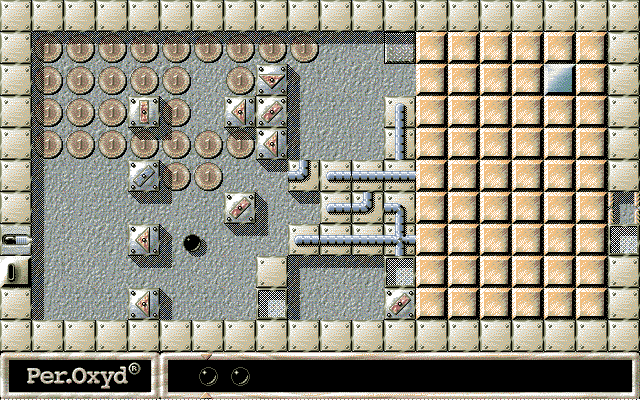
Per.Oxyd

Oxyd spawned a number of sequels: Oxyd Magnum, Oxyd Extra, and per.Oxyd (also known as Oxyd 2). Oxyd itself was a sequel to a lesser-known game, called Esprit.

Furthermore, Esprit is a derivative of Bolo for the Atari ST, also developed by Meinolf Amekudzi. Not to be confused with Bolo (1987 video game), released the same year. Bolo involves moving a paddle around, and is a derivative of Breakout, however the paddle can be moved anywhere on-screen, with the balls being able to bounce freely in any side or direction.

Enigma is an open source fangame with over a thousand different landscapes that can also read the original Oxyd level packs (they are not included for copyright reasons). Also, the included "Dejavu" level packs contain levels with similar ideas to the original levels.

Mad Data, with the permission of Dongleware, produced an official freeware game with the name "Oxyd extra v2.0".

== Planned remake and re-releases ==
In summer 2019, Dongleware announced a completely new Oxyd release and a port of the classic version to the Nintendo Switch console. Around 2020, the Oxydgames twitter account was suspended. In March 2021, the Steam store page for the game was removed. In 2024, both the German and English website went down, with only the YouTube channel remaining. The current status of the re-releases is unknown.
