= Sleepwalker (video game) =

1993 video game

- European cover art
- Developer: CTA Developments
- Publisher: Ocean Software
- Composers: Dave Newman, James Veal (Amiga); Barry Leitch, Keith Tinman (SNES)
- Platforms: Amiga, Amiga CD32, C64, Atari STE, MS-DOS, Super NES (as Eek! The Cat)
- Release: 1993, 1994 (as Eek! The Cat)
- Genres: Platform, Strategy
- Mode: Single player

Initial reviews

Review scores
Publication	Score
Amiga Computing	90% (Amiga)
Amiga Format	91% (Amiga); 83% (CD32)
Amiga Power	84% (Amiga); 83% (CD32)
Commodore Format	90% (C64)
CU Amiga	81% (Amiga)
GamesMaster	79% (Amiga)
ST Action	92% (ST)
ST Format	92% (ST)

Sleepwalker is a platform game developed by CTA Developments and published by Ocean Software for the Amiga, Amiga CD32, Commodore 64 and Atari STE in 1993. It was later ported to MS-DOS.

The game was later re-released in 1994, using the Eek! The Cat license for the Super Nintendo Entertainment System.

== Summary and gameplay ==
The game centers on a boy called Lee and his faithful dog Ralph. The player is then introduced to Lee from the dog's perspective after waking up to find his owner sleepwalking through his bedroom window, and leaping after him.

Throughout the game Lee continually walks in the direction he is facing; the problem is that there are objects and pitfalls in his path that can ultimately wake him up or even kill him. The player can monitor Lee's sleep level with a bar at the top of the screen. If the bar reaches zero, Lee wakes up and the player loses a life. If this happens three (or five depending on settings) times, then the game is lost.

The player controls Ralph in order to manipulate either Lee, or the objects he is likely to walk into, to see him safely to the end of a level. The frequency of these pitfalls increases as each level progresses and, as it does, the player has to spend more time strategically neutralising threats, far in advance of Lee's actual position in the level.

Although it is possible for Lee to die, resulting in a life lost and restarting the level, Ralph is invincible, surviving otherwise fatal incidents with comedic effect.

If all the levels are successfully completed, Lee finally returns to his bed and crawls back in.

== Comic Relief ==
The game was made to promote the charity Comic Relief. All profits from sales of the game went to the charity.

Many references to Comic Relief were made:

- Lenny Henry, who is heavily connected with the charity, was cast as Ralph's voice in the game's animated introductions.
- The Ocean Software logo was animated to include a red tomato being thrown at it (tomatoes were the theme of that year's Comic Relief event) with the charity logo stamped on top of the resulting mess. The phrase "Comic Relief or som'ing", voiced by comedian Harry Enfield, was then heard.
- The opening title of the game features Lee and Ralph moving from left to right and then right to left inside the letters of the word "Sleepwalker". Each time they move from right to left, they are seen wearing red noses (which turn green when a cheat is activated).
- Letters can be collected that spelled out the word "COMIC" at the top of the screen. An extra life is awarded for successfully collecting all five letters. (On the Commodore 64 version, collecting "COMIC" gives access to the bonus level once the end of the current main level is reached; here the player has to collect as tomatoes to earn bonus points.)
- A whoopee cushion (another product sold to raise money for the charity) features in the game as a bonus object, and picking it up gives Ralph a limited period of invulnerability.
