= Enigma (2002 video game) =

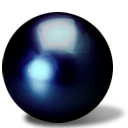
- Enigma icon
- Developers: Ronald Lamprecht, Raoul Bourquin, Andreas Lochmann, Daniel Heck (founder), ...
- Composers: Andrew Sega; Clifford J. Tasner
- Engine: Custom
- Platforms: Windows, Mac OS X, GP2X, Linux, FreeBSD
- Release: 14 May 2002 (version 0.40); 25 May 2007 (version 1.01); 27 August 2021 (version 1.30)
- Genre: Puzzle
- Mode: Single-player

Enigma is a puzzle video game based on Oxyd, and is released under the GNU GPL-2.0-or-later. Enigma continues to be very popular as an open source multi-platform derivative of Oxyd now that Oxyd is no longer maintained. The open source fangame Enigma has been praised in reviews.

Enigma is a marble game. Landscapes usually take the form of logic puzzles, although frequently, dexterity with the pointing device (the only form of input) is also required. The game is based on a traditional square grid map (2D computer graphics) and a realistic physics simulation.

Enigma is cross-platform and available for Mac OS X, GP2X, Microsoft Windows, FreeBSD and Linux (with packages available for several distributions).

== Gameplay ==
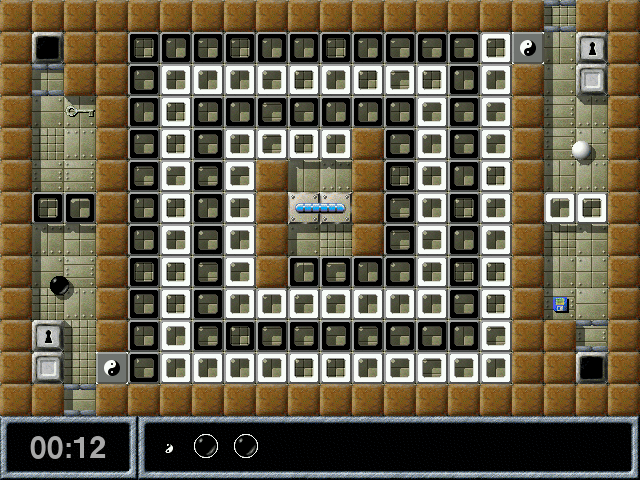
Enigma screenshot of level Enigma IV, #2: Double-Spiral

Enigma consists of approximately 2500 levels, known as 'landscapes', which may be played in any order. The player controls one or more marbles using the mouse, and interacts with the landscape purely through the marble. Levels fall into two broad categories: Oxyd landscapes and Meditation landscapes. Some levels may appear to fall into one category while actually being in the other.

=== Obstacle course navigation ===
Apart from the introductory levels that gradually introduce the game's mechanics to the player, each level either contains a puzzle, race, or hazards which the player must solve, win, or avoid. The player risks making the level impossible to solve or having the marble sink, fall down an abyss, or be crushed or otherwise destroyed. The challenges tax the player's problem solving and logic skills, dexterity, patience and speed. These factors determine the overall difficulty of the level. If the player loses a marble, one of the player's lives shown in the form of spare marbles in the inventory is lost. The level automatically restarts from the beginning when all lives are lost, with the Oxyd colours randomly shuffled again. Some levels even have mazes the player must navigate.

=== Scoring system ===
Enigma also contains a score system which tracks how fast the player finishes the level. When a level is completed, a "personal record" for the level is made. All levels have two records which the player can try to beat: PAR (derived from the golf scoring format) and World Record. PAR usually takes some quick doing to achieve and even changes with time in the newer versions. Setting a new World Record is nearly impossible even for the dedicated player except through sheer luck. World Records are usually formed by groups of very dedicated players who have mastered moving the marble quickly but precisely and know the ins and outs of each level.

Score statistics are published every month at the official website of Enigma. The most important categories are World Record Statistics and Solved Level Statistics. Due to the large number of levels and the variety of challenges involved, achieving 100% level completion is no small task. According to in-game published statistics, as of December 2010 only one person has managed 100% level completion. (Note: Enigma version 1.01, released on 25 May 2007.)

== History ==
The initial release of Enigma was in 2002. Development started due to a stated desire to keep the spirit of the game Oxyd alive since its publisher had decided to leave the video game market that same year. In 2007, Enigma reached stable version 1.01. Current version is 1.30.

=== Development ===
The landscapes are generated by scripts in the Lua programming language, making the creation of complicated landscapes relatively easy. A level editor exists. Composer of the menu music 'Pentagonal Dreams' is Andrew 'Necros' Sega.

Enigma does not currently support the popular cooperative two-player network games that were available with some versions of Oxyd, but most of the two-player landscapes are playable in single-player.

== Reception ==
Enigma has been praised in reviews as open source fan game and clone of Oxyd. Enigma was selected by Linux Format as "HotPick" in February 2007. It is included in many Linux distributions and is distributed over various freeware outlets. Enigma was downloaded alone over SourceForge between 2011 and May 2017 over 110,000 times according to their download statistic, computerbild.de counted another 30,000 downloads.

Also several video game magazines' cover disks included Enigma as part of Freeware and remake collections, for instance GameStar from June 2005.
