= ST Book =

Atari laptop (1991–1993)

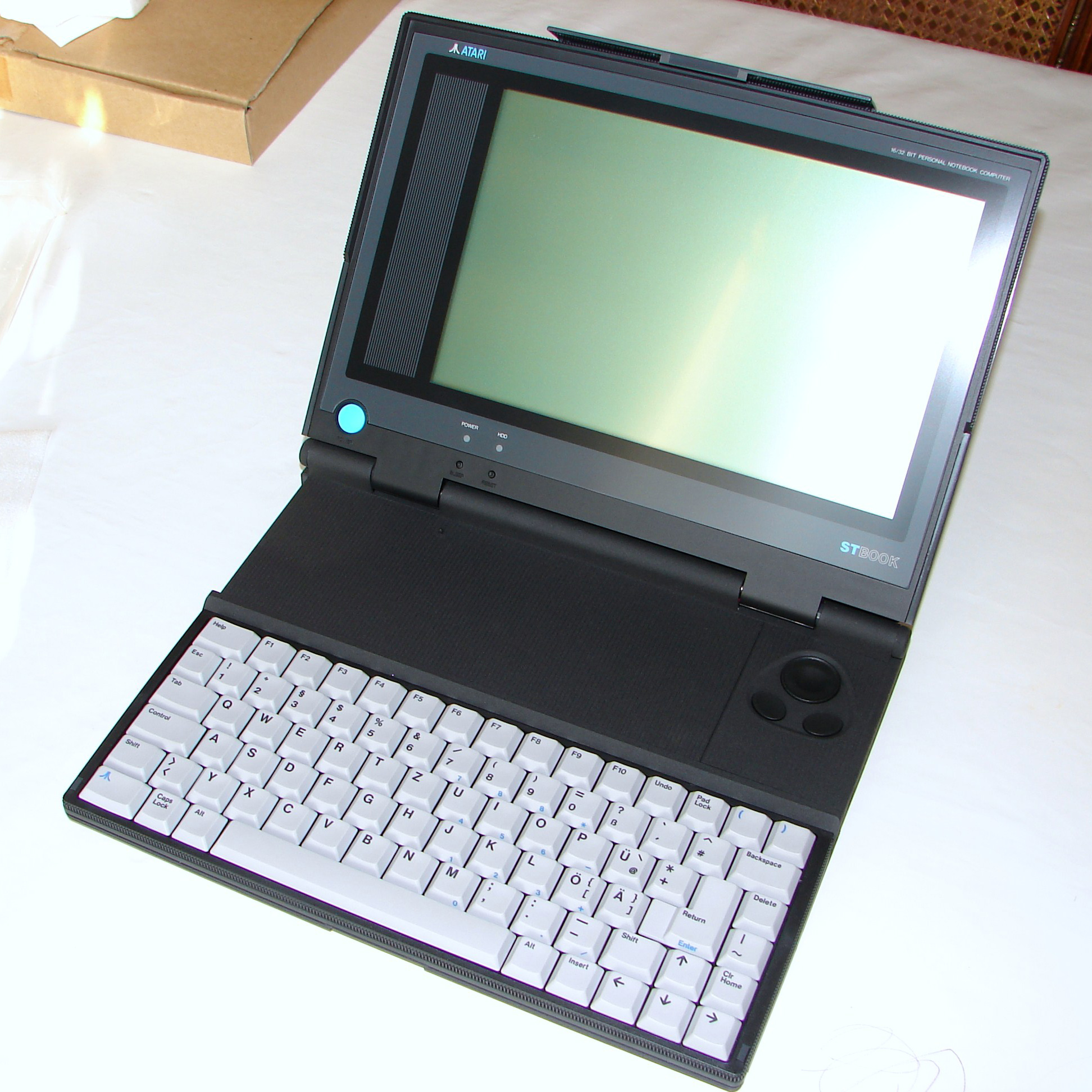
- Developer: Tracey Hall (Designer)
- Manufacturer: Atari Corporation
- Type: Laptop (notebook)
- Released: October 1991; 34 years ago
- Discontinued: 1993
- Units shipped: 1000-1200
- Operating system: Atari TOS 2.06 (modified)
- CPU: Motorola 68HC000 @ 8 MHz
- Memory: RAM: 1 MiB on board, can be expanded to 4 MiB; ROM: 512 KiB
- Storage: Hard disk: 40/80/120 MB 2.5" IDE; Floppy disk: optional external drive
- Display: 10.4" passive matrix LCD (EPSON)
- Graphics: 640×400 1-bit mono
- Power: 7 AA batteries Optional extra: Rechargeable NiCad battery pack (up to 10 hours power); AC Adapter (110/220 V switchable)
- Dimensions: 8.5 in × 11.4 in × 1.4 in (216 mm × 290 mm × 36 mm)
- Weight: 4.2 pounds (1.9 kg)
- Predecessor: STacy

The ST Book (also written as STBook) is a notebook-sized laptop released in October 1991 by Atari Corporation. It is based on the Atari STE. The ST Book is more portable than the previous Atari portable, the STacy, but it sacrifices several features in order to achieve this: notably the backlight, and internal floppy disc drive.

The screen is highly reflective. It supports the 640×400 1-bit mono mode only without an external video port. It gained some popularity as being the most utterly portable full-featured computer of the day (slim, light, quiet, reliable, and with a long battery life, even by modern standards for all 5).

The ST Book is shipped with a modified version of TOS 2.06.

== Specifications ==
Model number: NST-141

- Blitter
- Character set: Atari ST character set (based on code page 437)
- Real-time clock Lithium Battery
- Parallel: 1 port
- Serial: 1 port
- ACSI/FDD: 1 port
- MIDI: 2 ports
- External keyboard
- Internal Modem: optional (used for this model's expansion port)
- Vector Pad
