= Bolo (Breakout clone) =

1987 video game

- Publishers: Application Systems Heidelberg; Dongleware Verlags GmbH
- Programmer: Meinolf Schneider
- Platforms: Atari ST, Macintosh, MS-DOS
- Release: Atari ST: DE: 1987; Mac, MS-DOS: WW: 1995
- Genre: Breakout
- Mode: Single-player

Bolo is a 1987 Breakout clone written for the Atari ST with the high resolution monochrome monitor. It was later remade for Macintosh and MS-DOS. Bolo was written by Meinolf Schneider, who wrote the Oxyd games. Bolo is in the same vein as Taito's Arkanoid with numerous additions such as gravity, exploding bricks, and tunneling.
