= Atari ST =

Line of home computers from Atari Corporation

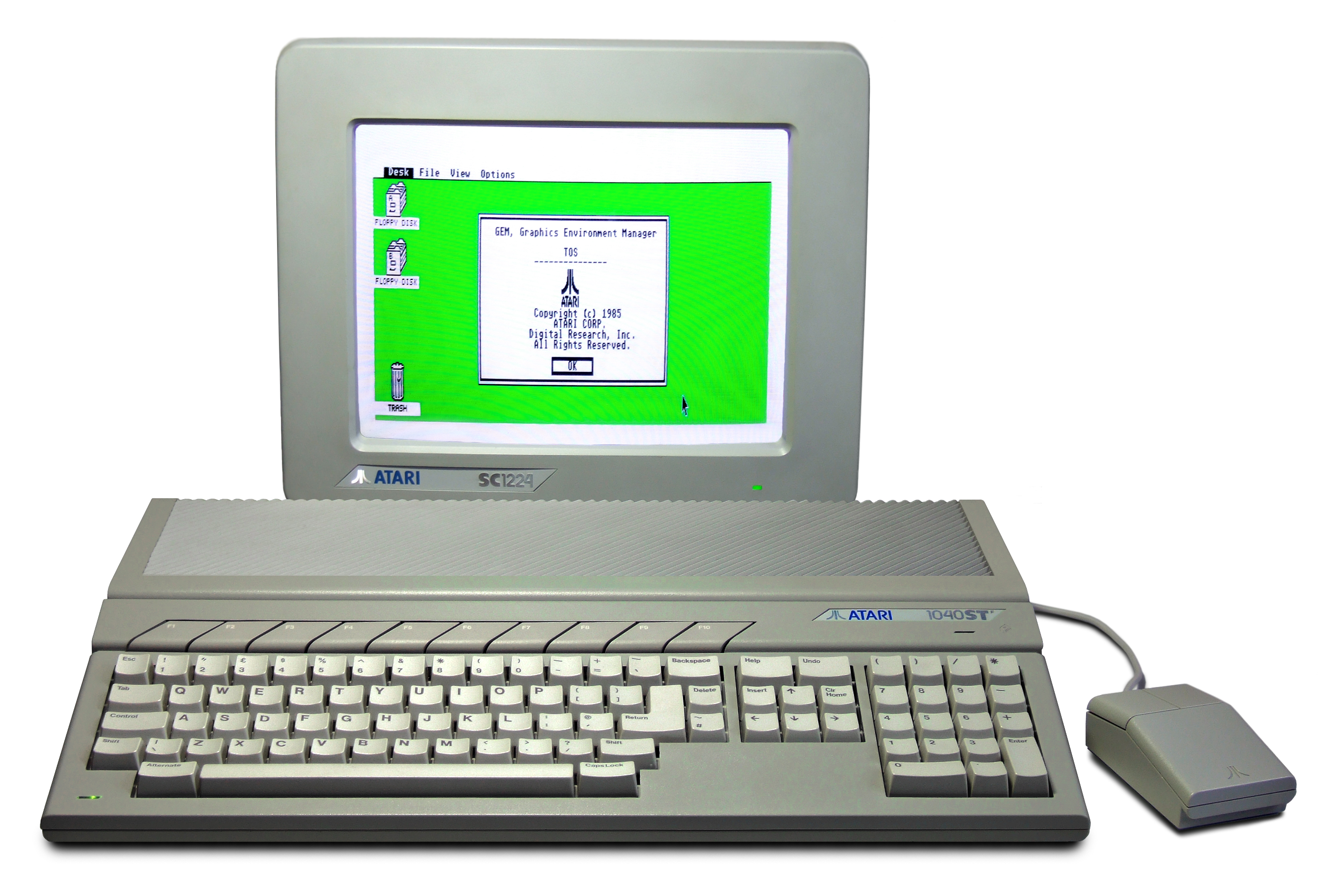
- Developer: Atari Corporation
- Manufacturer: Atari Corporation
- Type: Personal computer
- Released: June 1985; 41 years ago
- Introductory price: US$799.99 (monochrome); US$999.99 (color monitor)
- Discontinued: 1993; 33 years ago
- Units sold: Over 3 million (Europe)
- Operating system: Digital Research's GEM on Atari TOS
- CPU: 68000 @ 8+ MHz
- Memory: 512 KB to 4 MB
- Graphics: 320 × 200 (16 colors); 640 × 200 (4 colors); 640 × 400 (monochrome)
- Sound: YM2149F
- Predecessor: Atari 8-bit computers

Atari ST is a line of personal computers from Atari Corporation and the successor to the company's 8-bit computers. The initial model, the Atari 520ST, had limited release in April–June 1985, and was widely available in July. It was the first personal computer with a bitmapped color graphical user interface, using a version of Digital Research's GEM environment from February 1985. The Atari 1040ST, released in 1986 with 1 MB of memory, was the first home computer with a cost per kilobyte of RAM under US$1/KB.

After Jack Tramiel purchased the assets of the Atari, Inc. consumer division in 1984 to create Atari Corporation, the 520ST was designed in five months by a small team led by Shiraz Shivji. Alongside the Macintosh, Amiga, Apple IIGS, and Archimedes, the ST is part of a mid-1980s generation of computers with 16 or 32-bit processors, 256 KB or more of RAM, and mouse-controlled graphical user interfaces. "ST" officially stands for "Sixteen/Thirty-two", referring to the Motorola 68000's 16-bit external bus and 32-bit internals.

The ST was sold with either Atari's color monitor or less expensive monochrome monitor. Color graphics modes are available only on the former while the highest-resolution mode requires the monochrome monitor. Most models can display the color modes on a TV. In Germany and some other markets, the ST gained a foothold for CAD and desktop publishing. With built-in MIDI ports, it was popular for music sequencing and as a controller of musical instruments among amateur and professional musicians. The Atari ST's primary competitor was the Amiga from Commodore.

The 520ST and 1040ST were followed by the Mega series, the STE, and the portable STacy. In the early 1990s, Atari released three final evolutions of the ST with significant technical differences from the original models: TT030 (1990), Mega STE (1991), and Falcon (1992). Atari discontinued the entire ST computer line in 1993, shifting the company's focus to the Jaguar video game console.

== Development ==
The Atari ST was born from the rivalry between home computer makers Atari, Inc. and Commodore International. Jay Miner, one of the designers of the custom chips in the Atari 2600 and Atari 8-bit computers, tried to convince Atari management to create a new chipset for a video game console and computer. When his idea was rejected, he left Atari to form a small think tank called Hi-Toro in 1982 and began designing the new "Lorraine" chipset.

Hi-Toro, by then renamed Amiga, ran out of capital to complete Lorraine's development. Atari, now owned by Warner Communications, paid Amiga to continue its work. In return, Atari received exclusive use of the Lorraine design for one year as a video game console. After that time, Atari had the right to add a keyboard and market the complete computer, designated the 1850XLD.

=== Tramel Technology ===
After leaving Commodore International in January 1984, Jack Tramiel formed Tramel (without an "i") Technology, Ltd. with his sons and other ex-Commodore employees and, in April, began planning a new computer. Interested in Atari's overseas manufacturing and worldwide distribution network, Tramiel negotiated with Warner in May and June 1984. He secured funding and bought Atari's consumer division, which included the console and home computer departments, in July. The arcade video game division remained part of Warner. As executives and engineers left Commodore to join Tramel Technology, Commodore filed lawsuits against four former engineers for infringement of trade secrets. The Tramiels did not purchase the employee contracts with the assets of Atari, Inc. and re-hired approximately 100 of the 900 former employees. Tramel Technology soon changed its name to Atari Corporation.

=== Commodore and Amiga ===
Amid rumors that Tramiel was negotiating to buy Atari, Amiga Corp. entered discussions with Commodore. This led to Commodore wanting to purchase Amiga Corporation outright, which Commodore believed would cancel any outstanding contracts, including Atari's. Instead of Amiga Corp. delivering Lorraine to Atari, Commodore delivered a check of $500,000 on Amiga's behalf, in effect returning the funds Atari invested in Amiga for the chipset. Tramiel countered by suing Amiga Corp. on August 13, 1984, seeking damages and an injunction to bar Amiga (and effectively Commodore) from producing anything with its technology.

The lawsuit left the Amiga team in limbo during mid-1984. Commodore eventually moved forward, with plans to improve the chipset and develop an operating system. Commodore announced the Amiga 1000 with the Lorraine chipset in July 1985, but it wasn't available in quantity until 1986. The delay gave Atari time to deliver the Atari 520ST in June 1985. In March 1987, the two companies settled the dispute out of court in a closed decision.

=== ST hardware ===
The lead architect of the new computer project at Tramel Technology and Atari Corporation was ex-Commodore employee Shiraz Shivji, who previously worked on the Commodore 64's development. Different CPUs were investigated, including the 32-bit National Semiconductor NS32000, but engineers were disappointed with its performance, and they moved to the Motorola 68000. The Atari ST design was completed in five months in 1984, concluding with it being shown at the January 1985 Consumer Electronics Show.

A custom sound processor called AMY had been in development at Atari, Inc. and was considered for the new ST computer design. The chip needed more time to complete, so AMY was dropped in favor of a commodity Yamaha YM2149F variant of the General Instrument AY-3-8910.

=== Operating system ===
Soon after the Atari buyout, Microsoft suggested to Tramiel that it could port Windows to the platform, but the delivery date was out by two years. A proposal to write a new operating system was rejected as Atari management was unsure whether the company had the required expertise.

Digital Research was working on a new GUI-based system called Crystal, soon to become GEM, but was fully committed to the Intel platform. A team from Atari was sent to Digital Research headquarters to work on a port to the 68000. Atari's Leonard Tramiel oversaw "Project Jason" (also known as The Operating System) for the ST series, named for designer and developer Jason Loveman.

GEM is based on CP/M-68K, a direct port of CP/M to the 68000. By 1985, CP/M was becoming increasingly outdated; it did not support subdirectories, for example. Digital Research was also in the process of building GEMDOS, a disk operating system for GEM, and debated whether a port of it could be completed in time for product delivery in June. The decision was eventually taken to port it, resulting in a GEMDOS file system which became part of Atari TOS (for "The Operating System", colloquially known as the "Tramiel Operating System"). This gave the ST a fast, hierarchical file system, essential for hard drives, and provided programmers with function calls similar to MS-DOS. The Atari ST character set is based on codepage 437.

== Release ==
After six months of intensive effort following Tramiel's takeover, Atari announced the 520ST at the Winter Consumer Electronics Show in Las Vegas in January 1985. InfoWorld assessed the prototypes shown at computer shows as follows:

Pilot production models of the Atari machine are much slicker than the hand-built models shown at earlier computer fairs; it doesn't look like a typical Commodore 64-style, corner-cutting, low-cost Jack Tramiel product of the past.

Atari unexpectedly displayed the ST at Atlanta COMDEX in May. Similarities to the original Macintosh and Tramiel's role in its development resulted in it being nicknamed Jackintosh. Atari's rapid development of the ST amazed many, but others were skeptical, citing its "cheap" appearance, Atari's uncertain financial health, and poor relations between Tramiel-led Commodore and software developers.

In early 1985, the 520ST shipped to the press, developers, and user groups, and in early July 1985 for general retail sales. It saved the company. Atari ST print advertisements stated, "America, We Built It For You", and quoted Atari president Sam Tramiel: "We promised. We delivered. With pride, determination, and good old ATARI know how". By November, Atari stated that more than 50,000 520STs had been sold, "with U.S. sales alone well into five figures". The machine had gone from concept to store shelves in a little under one year.

Atari had intended to release the 130ST with 128 KB of RAM and the 260ST with 256 KB. However, the ST initially shipped without TOS in ROM and required booting TOS from floppy, taking 206 KB RAM away from applications. The 260ST was launched in Europe on a limited basis. Early models have six ROM sockets for easy upgrades to TOS. New ROMs were released a few months later and were included in new machines and as an upgrade for older machines.

Atari originally intended to include GEM's Graphical Device Operating System (GDOS), which allows programs to send GEM VDI (Virtual Device Interface) commands to drivers loaded by GDOS. This allows developers to send VDI instructions to other devices simply by pointing to it. However, GDOS was not ready at the time the ST started shipping and was included in software packages and with later ST machines. Later versions of GDOS support vector fonts.

An ST BASIC program to display the face of J.R. "Bob" Dobbs

A limited set of GEM fonts were included in the ROMs, including the ST's standard 8x8 pixel graphical character set. It contains four characters which can be placed together in a square, forming the face of J. R. "Bob" Dobbs (the figurehead of the Church of the SubGenius).

The ST was less expensive than most contemporaries, including the Macintosh Plus, and is faster than many. Largely as a result of its price and performance factor, the ST became fairly popular, especially in Europe where foreign-exchange rates amplified prices. The company's English advertising slogan of the era was "Power Without the Price". An Atari ST and terminal emulation software was much cheaper than a Digital VT220 terminal, commonly needed by offices with central computers.

By late 1985, the 520ST^{M} added an RF modulator for TV display.

=== Industry reaction ===
Computer Gaming World stated that Tramiel's poor pre-Atari reputation would likely make computer stores reluctant to deal with the company, hurting its distribution of the ST. One retailer said, "If you can believe Lucy when she holds the football for Charlie Brown, you can believe Jack Tramiel"; another said that because of its experience with Tramiel, "our interest in Atari is zero, zilch". Neither Atari nor Commodore could persuade large chains like ComputerLand or BusinessLand to sell its products. Observers criticized Atari's erratic discussion of its stated plans for the new computer, as it shifted between using mass merchandisers, specialty computer stores, and both. When asked at COMDEX, Atari executives could not name any computer stores that would carry the ST. After a meeting with Atari, one analyst said, "We've seen marketing strategies changed before our eyes".

Tramiel's poor reputation influenced potential software developers. One said, "Dealing with Commodore is like dealing with Attila the Hun. I don't know if Tramiel will be following his old habits ... I don't see a lot of people rushing to get software on the machine." Large business-software companies like Lotus, Ashton-Tate, and Microsoft did not promise software for either the ST or Amiga, and the majority of software companies were hesitant to support another platform beyond the IBM PC, Apple, and Commodore 64. Philippe Kahn of Borland said, "These days, if I were a consumer, I'd stick with companies [such as Apple and IBM] I know will be around".

At Las Vegas COMDEX in November 1985, the industry was surprised by more than 30 companies exhibiting ST software while the Amiga had almost none. After Atlanta COMDEX, The New York Times reported that "more than 100 software titles will be available for the [ST], most written by small software houses that desperately need work", and contrasted the "small, little-known companies" at Las Vegas with the larger ones like Electronic Arts and Activision, which planned Amiga applications.

Trip Hawkins of Electronic Arts said, "I don't think Atari understands the software business. I'm still skeptical about its resources and its credibility." Although Michael Berlyn of Infocom promised that his company would quickly publish all of its games for the new computer, he doubted many others would soon do so. Spinnaker and Lifetree were more positive, both promising to release ST software. Spinnaker said that "Atari has a vastly improved attitude toward software developers. They are eager to give us technical support and machines". Lifetree said, "We are giving Atari high priority". Some, such as Software Publishing Corporation, were unsure of whether to develop for the ST or the Amiga. John C. Dvorak wrote that the public saw both Commodore and Atari as selling "cheap disposable" game machines, in part because of their computers' sophisticated graphics.

== Design ==
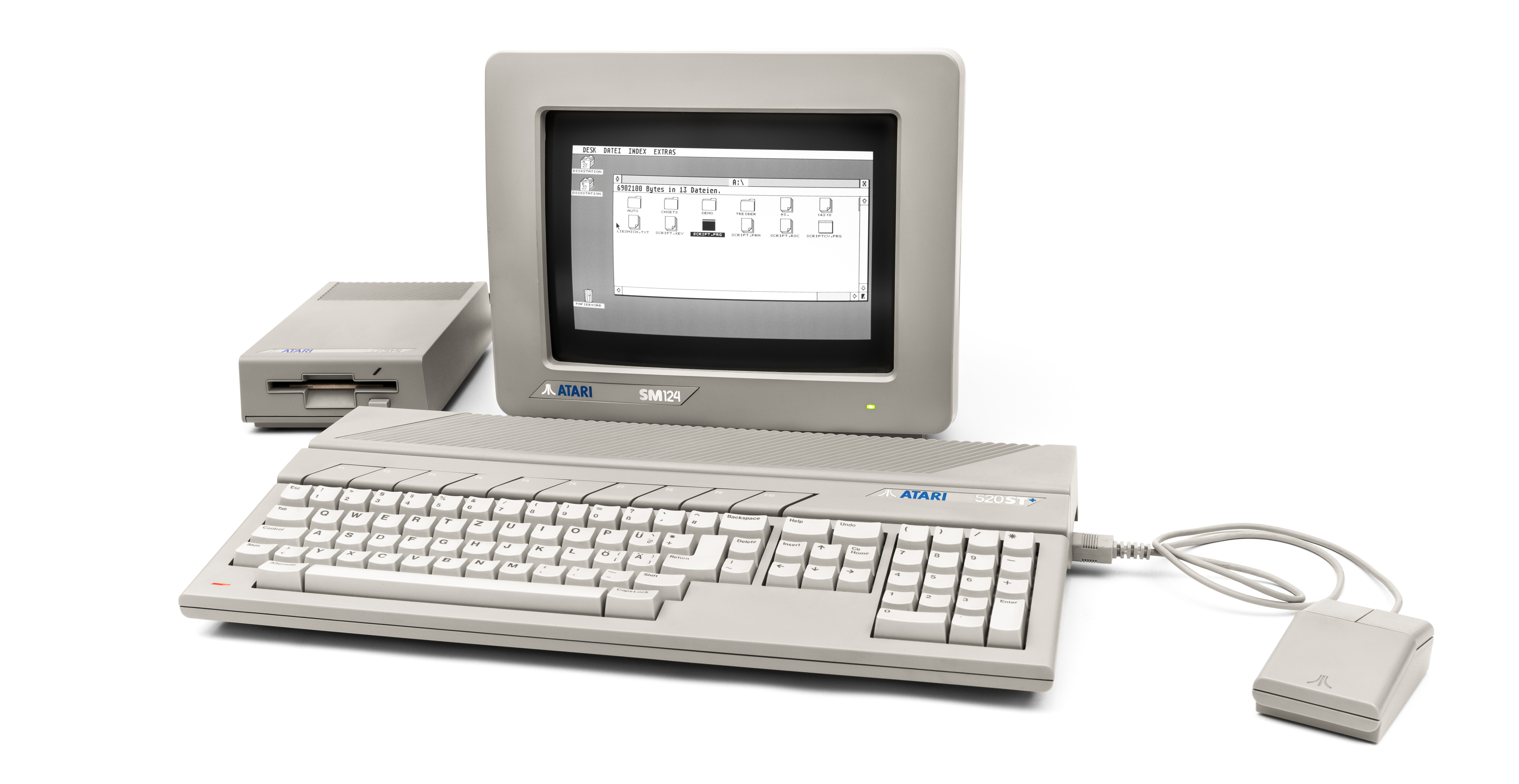
The Atari 520ST+ has 1 MB RAM, twice that of the original model, but does not have the internal floppy drive of the 1040ST.

The original 520ST case design was created by Ira Velinsky, Atari's chief Industrial Designer. It is wedge-shaped, with bold angular lines and a series of grilles cut into the rear for airflow. The keyboard has soft tactile feedback and rhomboid-shaped function keys across the top. It is an all-in-one unit, similar to earlier home computers like the Commodore 64, but with a larger keyboard with cursor keys and a numeric keypad. The original has an external floppy drive (SF354) and AC adapter. Starting with the 1040ST, the floppy drive and power supply are integrated into the base unit.

=== Ports ===
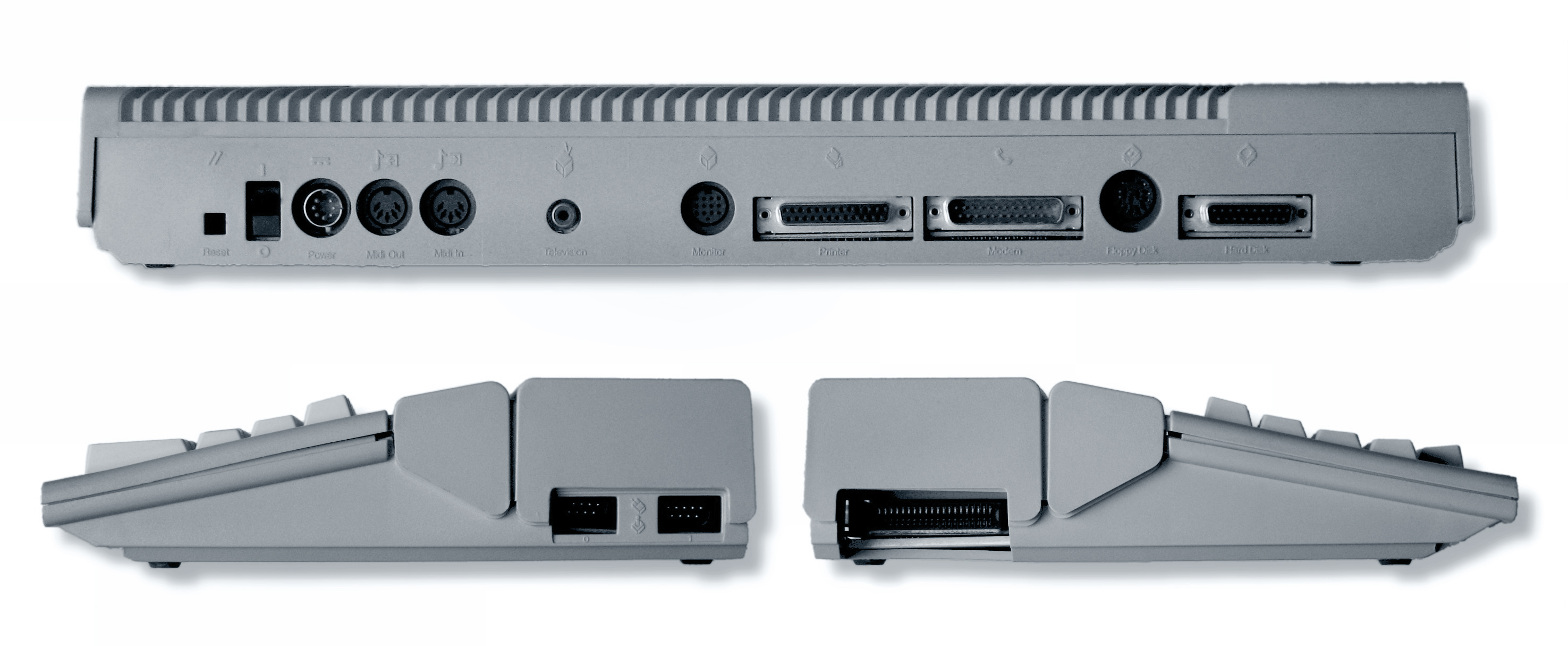
Atari 520ST ports

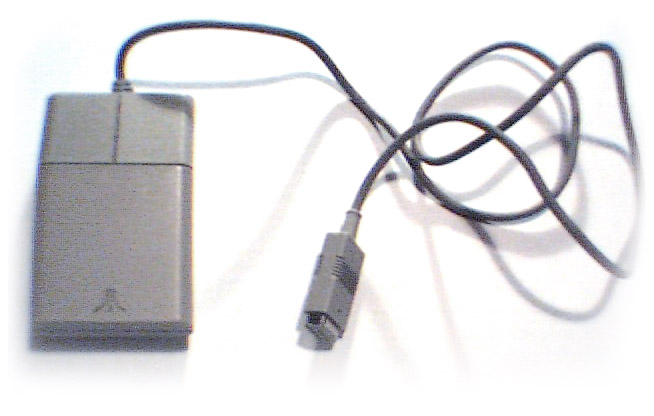
Atari ST mouse (2000)

The ports on the 520ST remained largely unchanged over its history.

==== Standard ====
- RS-232c serial port (DB25 male, operating as basic 9-conductor DTE)
- Centronics printer port (DB25 female, officially compliant only with the most basic unidirectional standard with a single, "Busy" input line; unofficially offering some bidirectional capabilities)
- Atari joystick ports (DE-9 male) for the mouse and game controllers
- 2 MIDI ports (5-pin DIN, "IN" and "OUT")

Because of its bi-directional design, the Centronics printer port can be used for joystick input, and several games used available adaptors that used the printer socket, providing two additional 9-pin joystick ports.

==== ST-specific ====
- Monitor port (custom 13-pin DIN, 12 of the pins in a rectangular pattern, carrying signals for both RGB and monochrome monitors, monophonic audio and, in later models, composite video)
- ACSI (similar to SCSI) DMA port (custom-sized 19-pin D-sub, for hard disks and laser printers, capable of up to 2 MB/s with efficient programming)
- Floppy port (14-pin DIN, listed as operating at 250 kbit/s)
- ST cartridge port (double-sided 40-contact edge connector socket, for 128 KB ROM cartridges)

=== Monitor ===
The ST supports a monochrome or colour monitor. The colour hardware supports two resolutions: 320 × 200 pixels, with 16 of 512 colours; and 640 × 200, with 4 of 512 colours. The monochrome monitor was less expensive and has a single resolution of 640 × 400 at 71.25 Hz. The attached monitor determines available resolutions, so each application either supports both types of monitors or only one. Most ST games require colour with productivity software favouring the monochrome. The Philips CM8833-II was a popular color monitor for the Atari ST.

=== Floppy drive ===
Atari initially used single-sided 3.5 inch floppy disk drives that could store up to 360 KB. Later drives were double-sided and stored 720 KB. Some commercial software, particularly games, shipped by default on single-sided disks, even supplying two 360 KB floppies instead of a single double-sided one, to avoid alienating early adopters.

Some software uses formats which allow the full disk to be read by double-sided drives but still lets single-sided drives access side A of the disk. Many magazine coverdisks (such as the first 30 issues of ST Format) were designed this way, as were a few games. The music in Carrier Command and the intro sequence in Populous are not accessible to single-sided drives, for example.

STs with double-sided drives can read disks formatted by MS-DOS, but IBM PC compatibles can not read Atari disks because of differences in the layout of data on track 0.

== Later systems ==
=== 1040ST ===
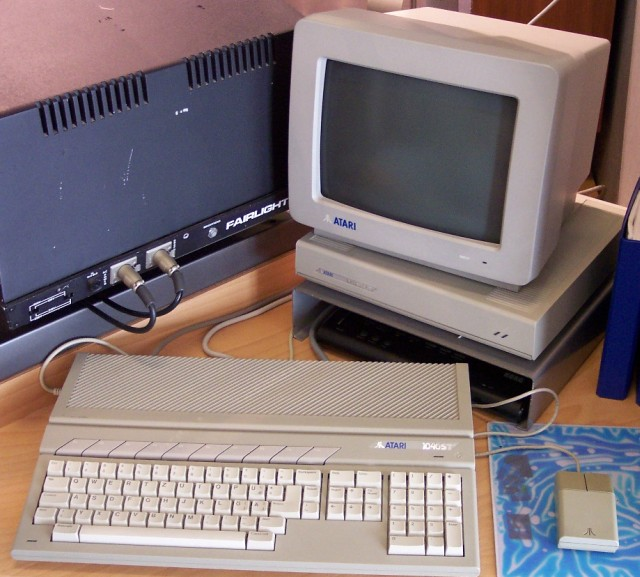
Atari 1040ST^{F}

Atari upgraded the basic design in 1986 with the 1040STF, stylized as 1040ST^{F}: essentially a 520ST with twice the RAM and with the power supply and a double-sided floppy drive with twice the capacity built-in instead of external. This adds to the size of the machine, but reduces cable clutter. The joystick and mouse ports, formerly on the right side of the machine, are in a recess underneath the keyboard. An "FM" variant includes an RF modulator allowing a television to be used instead of a monitor.

The trailing "F" and "FM" were often dropped in common usage. In BYTE magazine's March 1986 cover photo of the system, the name plate reads 1040ST^{FM} but in the headline and article it's simply "1040ST".

The 1040ST is one of the earliest personal computers shipped with a base RAM configuration of 1 MB. With a list price of US$999 (equivalent to about $2,900 in 2025) in the US, BYTE hailed it as the first computer to break the $1000 per megabyte price barrier. Compute! noted that the 1040ST is the first computer with one megabyte of RAM to sell for less than $2,500.

A limited number of 1040STFs shipped with a single-sided 360KB floppy drive.

=== Mega ===
Initial sales were strong, especially in Europe, where Atari sold 75% of its computers. West Germany became Atari's strongest market, with small business owners using them for desktop publishing and CAD.

To address this growing market segment, Atari introduced the ST1 at Comdex in 1986 before it was renamed to Mega. It includes a high-quality detached keyboard, a stronger case to support the weight of a monitor, and an internal bus expansion connector. An optional 20 MB hard drive can be placed below or above the main case. Initially equipped with 2 or 4 MB of RAM (a 1 MB version, the Mega 1, followed), the Mega machines can be combined with Atari's laser printer for a low-cost desktop publishing package.

A custom blitter coprocessor improved some graphics performance, but was not included in all models. Developers wanting to use it had to detect its presence in their programs. Properly written applications using the GEM API automatically make use of the blitter.

=== STE ===
In late 1989, Atari Corporation released the 520ST^{E} and 1040ST^{E} (also written STE), an enhanced version of the ST with improvements to the multimedia hardware and operating system. It has an increased color palette of 4,096 colors from the ST's 512 (though the maximum displayable colors without programming tricks is still limited to 16 in the lowest 320 × 200 resolution, and fewer in higher resolutions), genlock support, and a blitter coprocessor (stylized as "BLiTTER") which can quickly move large blocks of data (particularly, graphics data) around in RAM. The STE is the first Atari with PCM audio; using a new chip, it added the ability to play back 8-bit (signed) samples at 6258 Hz, 12,517 Hz, 25,033 Hz, and even 50,066 Hz, via direct memory access (DMA). The channels are arranged as either a mono track or a track of LRLRLRLR... bytes. RAM is more simply upgradable via SIMMs.

Two enhanced joystick ports were added (two normal joysticks can be plugged into each port with an adapter), with the new connectors placed in more easily accessed locations on the side of the case. The enhanced joystick ports were re-used in the Jaguar console and are compatible.

The STE models initially had software and hardware conflicts resulting in some applications and video games written for the ST line being unstable or even completely unusable, primarily caused by programming direct hardware calls which bypassed the operating system. Having a joystick plugged in sometimes caused strange behavior with a few applications (such as the WYSIWYG word-processor application 1st Word Plus). Sleepwalker was the only STE-only game from a major publisher, but there were STe enhancements in games such as Another World, Zool and The Chaos Engine, as well as exclusives from smaller companies.

The last STE machine, the Mega STE, is an STE in a grey Atari TT case that has a switchable 16 MHz, dual-bus design (16-bit external, 32-bit internal), optional Motorola 68881 FPU, built-in 1.44 MB "HD" 3 1/2-inch floppy disk drive, VME expansion slot, a network port (very similar to that used by Apple's LocalTalk) and an optional built-in 3 1/2" hard drive. It also shipped with TOS 2.00 (better support for hard drives, enhanced desktop interface, memory test, 1.44 MB floppy support, bug fixes). It was marketed as more affordable than a TT, but more powerful than an ordinary ST.

=== Atari TT ===
In 1990, Atari released the high-end workstation-oriented Atari TT030, based on a 32 MHz Motorola 68030 processor. The "TT" name ("Thirty-two/Thirty-two") continued the nomenclature because the 68030 chip has 32-bit buses both internally and externally. Originally planned with a 68020 CPU, the TT has improved graphics and more powerful support chips. The case has a new design with an integrated hard-drive enclosure.

=== Falcon ===
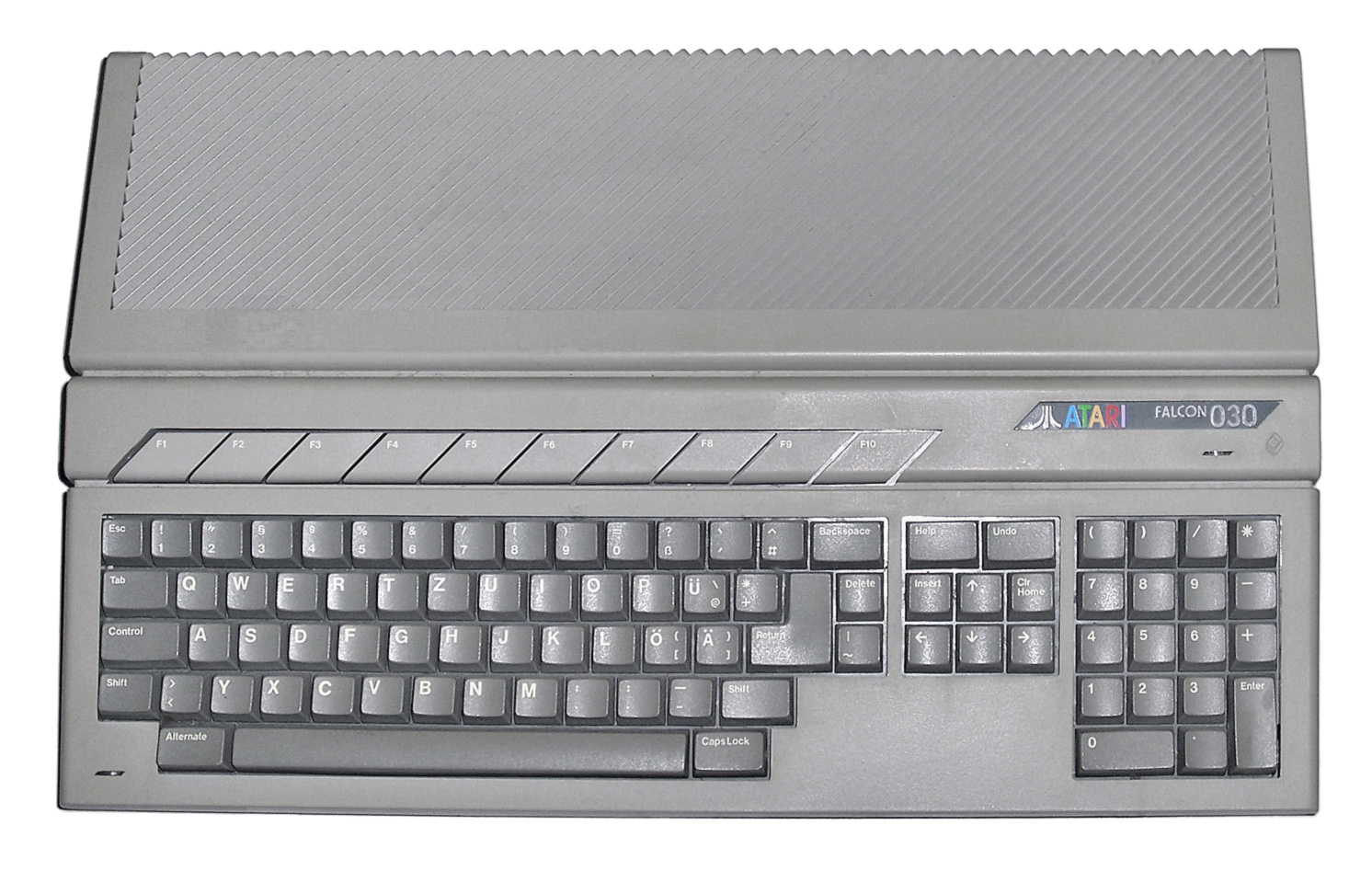
The Falcon case closely resembles that of the ST^{F} and ST^{E}, with a slightly altered color scheme.

The final model of ST computer is the Falcon030. Like the TT, it is 68030-based, at 16 MHz, but with improved video modes and an on-board Motorola 56001 audio digital signal processor. Like the Atari STE, it supports sampling frequencies above 44.1 kHz; the sampling master clock is 98340 Hz (which can be divided by a number between 2 and 16 to get the actual sampling frequencies). It can play the STE sample frequencies (up to 50066 Hz) in 8 or 16 bit, mono or stereo, all by using the same DMA interface as the STE, with a few additions. It can both play back and record samples, with 8 mono channels and 4 stereo channels, allowing musicians to use it for recording to hard drive. Although the 68030 microprocessor can use 32-bit memory, the Falcon uses a 16-bit bus, which reduces performance and cost. In another cost-reduction measure, Atari shipped the Falcon in an inexpensive case much like that of the ST^{F} and ST^{E}. Aftermarket upgrade kits allow it to be put in a desktop or rack-mount case, with the keyboard separate.

Released in 1992, the Falcon was discontinued by Atari the following year. In Europe, C-Lab licensed the Falcon design from Atari and released the C-Lab Falcon Mk I, identical to Atari's Falcon except for slight modifications to the audio circuitry. The Mk II added an internal 500 MB SCSI hard disk; and the Mk X further added a desktop case. C-Lab Falcons were also imported to the US by some Atari dealers.

== Software ==
As with the Atari 8-bit computers, software publishers attributed their reluctance to produce Atari ST products in part to—as Compute! reported in 1988—the belief in the existence of a "higher-than-normal amount of software piracy". That year, WordPerfect threatened to discontinue the Atari ST version of its word processor because the company discovered that pirate bulletin board systems (BBSs) were distributing it, causing ST-Log to warn that "we had better put a stop to piracy now ... it can have harmful effects on the longevity and health of your computer". A positive review of Typhoon Thompson in Antic concluded:

Lastly, to any pirates out there, this game is good. It is certainly worth buying. It's also the first major ST game effort by Broderbund and if you steal it, it may well be their last. Don't spoil things for the rest of the ST community by being a jerk and putting this game on your pirate board.

In 1989, magazines published a letter by Gilman Louie, head of Spectrum HoloByte. He stated that he had been warned by competitors that releasing a game like Falcon on the ST would fail because BBSs would widely disseminate it. Within 30 days of releasing the non-copy protected ST version, the game was available on BBSs with maps and code wheels. Because the ST market was smaller than that for the IBM PC, it was more vulnerable to piracy which, Louie said, seemed to be better organized and more widely accepted for the ST. He reported that the Amiga version sold in six weeks twice as much as the ST version in nine weeks, and that the Mac and PC versions had four times the sales. Computer Gaming World stated "This is certainly the clearest exposition ... we have seen to date" of why software companies produced less software for the ST than for other computers.

Several third-party OSes were developed for, or ported to, the Atari ST. Unix clones include Idris, Minix, and the MiNT OS which was developed specifically for the Atari ST.

=== Audio and MIDI ===
Taking advantage of the ST's MIDI ports, plenty of professional Music sequencing and notation software was released, including the forerunners of the popular Windows and macOS applications Cubase and Logic Pro (the latter as Creator, Notator, Notator-SL, and Notator Logic). Another popular and powerful ST music sequencer application, KCS, contains a "Multi-Program Environment" that allows ST users to run other applications, such as the synthesizer patch editing software XoR (later known as Unisyn), from within the sequencer application. MasterTracks Pro originated for the Apple II; an ST version and then an IBM PC version later followed. It continued on Windows and macOS, along with the original company's notation application, Encore.

Music tracker software such as the TCB Tracker became popular on the ST, aiding the production of quality music from the Yamaha synthesizer, now called chiptunes.

Due to the ST having comparatively large amounts of memory for the time, sound sampling packages became feasible. Replay Professional features a sound sampler using the ST cartridge port to read in parallel from the cartridge port from the ADC. For output of digital sound, it uses the on-board frequency output, sets it to 128 kHz (inaudible) and then modulates the amplitude of that.

=== Applications ===
Degas Elite by Batteries Included

Professional desktop publishing software includes Timeworks Publisher, PageStream and Calamus. Word processors include WordPerfect, Microsoft Write, AtariWorks, Signum, Script and First Word (bundled with the machine). Spreadsheets include 3D-Calc, and databases include Zoomracks. Graphics applications include NEOchrome, DEGAS & DEGAS Elite, Deluxe Paint, STAD, and Cyber Paint (which author Jim Kent would later evolve into Autodesk Animator) with advanced features such as 3D design and animation. The Spectrum 512 paint program uses rapid palette switching to expand the on-screen color palette to 512 (up to 46 colors per scan line).

3D computer graphics applications (like Cyber Studio CAD-3D, which author Tom Hudson later developed into Autodesk 3D Studio), brought 3D modelling, sculpting, scripting, and computer animation to the desktop. Video capture and editing applications use dongles connected to the cartridge port for low frame rate, mainly silent and monochrome, but progressed to sound and basic color in still frames. At the end, Spectrum 512 and CAD-3D teamed up to produce realistic 512-color textured 3D renderings, but processing was slow, and Atari's failure to deliver a machine with a math coprocessor had Hudson and Yost looking towards the PC as the future before a finished product could be delivered to the consumer.

Garry Kasparov became the first chess player to register a copy of ChessBase, a popular commercial database program for storing and searching records of chess games. The first version was built for Atari ST with his collaboration in January 1987. In his autobiography Child of Change, he regards this facility as "the most important development in chess research since printing".

Graphical touchscreen point of sale software for restaurants was originally developed for Atari ST by Gene Mosher under the ViewTouch copyright and trademark. Instead of using GEM, he developed a GUI and widget framework for the application using the NEOchrome paint program.

=== Software development ===
The 520ST was bundled with both Digital Research Logo and Atari ST BASIC. Third-party BASIC systems with better performance were eventually released: HiSoft BASIC, GFA BASIC, FaST BASIC, DBASIC, LDW BASIC, Omikron BASIC, BASIC 1000D and STOS. In the later years of the Atari ST, Omikron Basic was bundled with it in Germany.

Atari's initial development kit from Atari is a computer and manuals. The $5,000 (equivalent to $14,686 in 2025) cost discouraged development. The later Atari Developer's Kit consists of software and manuals for $300. It includes a resource kit, C compiler (first Alcyon C, then Mark Williams C), debugger, 68000 assembler, and non-disclosure agreement. The third-party Megamax C development package was $200.

Other development tools include 68000 assemblers (MadMac from Atari, HiSoft Systems's Devpac, TurboAss, GFA-Assembler), Pascal (OSS Personal Pascal, Maxon Pascal, PurePascal), Modula-2, C compilers (Lattice C, Pure C, Megamax C, GNU C, Aztec C, AHCC), LISP, and Prolog.

=== Games ===
The ST had success in gaming due to the low cost, fast performance, and colorful graphics compared to contemporary PCs or 8-bit systems. ST game developers include Steve Bak, Peter Molyneux, Doug Bell, Jeff Minter, Éric Chahi, Jez San, and David Braben.

When the Atari ST was released in 1985, it seemed to be aimed at the professional market. However, the inclusion of two joystick ports and a low-resolution mode of 320x200 pixels, with 16 colours from a 512-colour palette, hinted at its potential for gaming. Initially, it was uncertain whether these new 16-bit machines could really deliver a next-generation gaming experience, as the games at launch didn't show a significant visual improvement over the 8-bit systems of the time.

After a while, the first ST games began to appear that people were attracted to:

- Time Bandits – which brought the labyrinth action to the ST, but was not technically superior to the 8-bit.
- Major Motion – a Spy Hunter clone that could be played with the mouse.
- Arena – a decathlon game that had to be played with the keyboard, but had graphics with a level of detail beyond the capabilities of any 8-bit system.
- Megaroids – an Asteroids clone in a medium resolution of 640x200 in 4 colours. This made it outstanding at the time.
- Joust – an arcade port showing the new capabilities of bitmap graphics compared to the character set graphics of 8-bit systems – Moon Patrol – offered a high resolution 640×400 black and white version.
- SunDog: Frozen Legacy – An RPG with simple graphics, but a story that made it a classic.

As developers became more familiar with the ST's capabilities, they were able to exploit its full potential. This resulted in games with visuals that far surpassed anything seen on 8-bit systems. Notable examples include

- Goldrunner – Its sampled sound, bitmap graphics and smooth scrolling were impressive.
- Starglider – Featuring a multi-second title sample, a feat for the time, its fast, colourful 3D wireframe graphics showcased the power of the 16-bit processor.
- Gauntlet – Arcade port with the ability to play with 4 players via a parallel port joystick adapter.
- ST Karate – Fighting game
- Oids – 2D physics-based action game inspired by Thrust.

It wasn't long before ST games were gracing the covers of leading computer game magazines. It became standard practice to develop games on the ST and then port them to other platforms. Several of these titles went on to have a significant impact on the history of computer gaming:

- The realtime pseudo-3D role-playing video game Dungeon Master, was developed and released first on the ST, and is considered to be the best-selling software ever produced for the platform.
- Simulation games like Falcon and Flight Simulator II use the ST's graphics hardware, as do many arcade ports.
- The 1987 first-person shooter, MIDI Maze, uses the MIDI ports to connect up to 16 machines for networked deathmatch play.
- The 3D Rollercoaster Racer Stunt Car Racer had fast 3D graphics, surpassing those of other systems, largely due to the ST's powerful CPU.
- The arcade conversion Super Sprint remained exclusive to the ST for several years, cementing its status as one of the system's signature titles.

Beyond the mainstream releases, there was also a scene of games designed specifically for the Atari ST's monochrome mode. With its 640x400 resolution, coupled with the crisp display of Atari's SM124 monitor, this mode provided a canvas for distinctive games, offering unique aesthetics and gameplay:

- Oxyd – Based on the classic memory card game, Oxyd delivered a compelling puzzle experience.
- Ballerburg – A game that captivated a generation and may have paved the way for titles like Worms.
- Bolo – a breakout game.

The Atari ST enjoyed a period of dominance throughout the second half of the 1980s, but its influence began to diminish as the next decade dawned. Competitors with custom chips gained the upper hand for a time until the PC took over. During this period, games were predominantly developed on these rival systems and subsequently ported to the ST. The inherent nature of game conversions meant that the original, optimised for its native hardware, often suffered compromises in the translation. A prime example is [Wolfchild], a superb game in its original form, but the ST version was noticeably inferior due to a rushed port.

While the enhanced capabilities of the Atari 1040 STE were welcomed by the Atari ST community, the number of games that utilised them was limited. This was largely due to the relatively small user base of STe owners, making exclusive STe development commercially unviable. However, some titles did manage to garner positive attention beyond the Atari community:

- Obsession – A pinball simulation that boasted numerous tables, leveraging the STe's expanded colour palette and improved hardware scrolling.
- Substation – A first-person shooter set within an icy environment.
- Sleepwalker – an STe only game by Ocean Software.

The Atari Falcon, intended as the successor to the ST/STe, found a dedicated following within the Atari scene, resulting in a vibrant homebrew community. Sadly, the Falcon's overall market penetration was insufficient to make a widespread impact. Notable titles include:

- Crown of Creation – A 3D game.
- Ishar I, II, III – A series of well-regarded dungeon crawlers.
- Racer 2 – A highly polished driving game.
- Cannon Fodder – Top-down tactical shooter.

Although often overlooked by mainstream publications, the Atari ST gaming scene remains active. Dedicated Atari enthusiasts continue to develop and release new games. Notable examples include:

- Stario Land – A meticulously crafted platformer, reminiscent of Mario, which demonstrated the capabilities of smooth scrolling on the ST, subtly highlighting the shortcomings of earlier attempts like The Great Giana Sisters.
- Double Bobble 2000 – A faithful recreation of Bubble Bobble, specifically for the Atari Falcon.
- Grav – A challenging shoot-em-up.
- Hector vs The Mutant Vampire Tomatoes From Hel -: A quirky action-platformer.

Beyond the ongoing development of new games, the Atari ST community maintains a presence through various initiatives. Notably gatherings and MIDI Maze events demonstrate the popularity of networked play on the ST. Social media platforms, particularly YouTube, feature numerous channels dedicated to showcasing Atari ST games. Online resources like AtariMania (archiving), Atari-Forum (community), Atari Legend (the central Atari ST portal), and AtariCrypt (a diverse hub) serve as essential pillars of the community, ensuring the Atari ST remains an active platform.

=== Atari ST eSports ===
The ST Offline Tournament (STOT) is an offline gaming tournament for games created for the Atari ST. It is run in a dedicated section of Atari-Forum.com.

The STOT is divided into seasons. Each season lasts a year and consists of 12 rounds. Each round lasts one month and features one or more games. At the end of each month, the player with the highest score wins.

Either the organisers announce the game(s) for a round or a vote is held on the forum. If new Atari ST games are released, they take priority and will be played as soon as possible.

Players come from all over the world and play either on real hardware or emulators. To participate, you need a forum account.

STOT was founded in 2007 by Thorsten Butschke, ChrisTos and SSB. At that time, the first high score club tournaments on Atari Age appeared, and the goal was to create something similar for Atari ST games. The first game was Superfly. In 2011, the tournaments stopped due to a lack of time to organise them. However, due to demand from various players, the tournament was restarted in 2023.

The most remarkable gamers are Xerus, who dominated the first four seasons, and Wietze, who won most of the rounds he participated in during the later seasons.

Some authors have also supported the STOT by providing special versions or prizes.

- Simon Phipps, author of Switchblade, hand-painted a unique winner's certificate for the participants.
- SSB, the author of Attack Wave, gave away a unique, self-made 3.5-inch disk with a winner's certificate to participants.
- ThomasI, the author of Randominer, created a special STOT version of the game that involved a scoring competition

=== Emulators ===
Spectre GCR emulates the Macintosh. MS-DOS emulators were released in the late 1980s. PC-Ditto has a software-only version, and a hardware version that plugs into the cartridge slot or kludges internally. After running the software, an MS-DOS boot disk is required to load the system. Both run MS-DOS programs in CGA mode, though much more slowly than on an IBM PC. Other options are the PC-Speed (NEC V30), AT-Spee (Intel 80286), and ATonce-386SX (Intel 80386SX) hardware emulator boards.

== Music industry ==
The ST's low cost, built-in MIDI ports, and fast, low-latency response times made it a favorite with musicians.

- Prominent Russian film music and song composer Aleksandr Zatsepin started using personal computers for work with Atari 1040ST and continued using Cubase and Vienna Symphonic Library.
- German electronic music pioneers Tangerine Dream relied heavily on the Atari ST in the studio and for live performances during the late 1980s and 1990s.
- The album notes for Mike Oldfield's Earth Moving state that it was recorded using an Atari ST and C-Lab MIDI software.
- The Fatboy Slim album You've Come a Long Way, Baby was created using an Atari ST.
- In the Paris performance of Jean-Michel Jarre's album Waiting for Cousteau, the Paris La Défense – Une Ville En Concert, musicians have attached Atari ST machines with C-Lab Unitor software to their keyboards, as seen in the TV live show and video recordings.
- White Town's "Your Woman", which reached No. 1 in the UK singles charts, was created using an Atari ST.
- The Utah Saints used a 520ST and 1040ST running Cubase during the recording of both of their albums, Utah Saints and Two, with their 1040ST still occasionally used for re-recording or remixing early tracks up to 2015.
- Atari Teenage Riot programmed most of their music on an Atari ST, including the entire album Is This Hyperreal? (June 2011).
- Cabaret Voltaire founder Richard H. Kirk said in 2016 that he continues to write music on an Atari 1040ST with C-Lab.
- Darude used Cubase on an Atari 1040ST when he created his 2000 hit "Sandstorm".
- Depeche Mode used a combination of an Atari ST and Cubase in the studio during the production of Songs of Faith and Devotion in 1992. The machine is visible in the documentary included with the 2006 remaster of the album.
- Record producer Jimmy Hotz used an Atari ST to produce Fleetwood Mac's Tango in the Night album, and records for B. B. King and Dave Mason.
- English DJ and house producer Joey Negro.
- English songwriters and record producers Stock, Aitken, and Waterman.
- English synth-pop duo Pet Shop Boys replaced their Fairlight CMI with an Atari ST, with their programmer Pete Gleadall saying, "[Atari ST] was just much easier to work with".
- Canadian industrial band Skinny Puppy used the Atari ST with Steinberg Pro 24 software to produce several of their albums, including Rabies and The Process. A 1040ST can be seen in footage of the band jamming in their studio during The Process's writing sessions.
- Dario G used the Atari ST to produce the dance track "Sunchyme" which reached No. 2 in the UK charts.

== Technical specifications ==
All STs are made up of both custom and commercial chips.

- Custom chips:
  - ST Shifter "Video shift register chip": Enables bitmap graphics using 32 KB of contiguous memory for all resolutions. Screen address has to be a multiple of 256.
  - ST GLU "Generalized Logic Unit": Control logic for the system used to connect the ST's chips. Not part of the data path, but needed to bridge chips with each other.
  - ST MMU "Memory Management Unit": Provides signals needed for CPU/blitter/DMA and Shifter to access dynamic RAM. Even memory accesses are given to CPU/blitter/DMA while odd cycles are reserved for DRAM refresh or used by Shifter for displaying contents of the frame buffer.
  - ST DMA "Direct Memory Access": Used for floppy and hard drive data transfers. Can directly access main memory in the ST.
- Support chips:
  - MC6850P ACIA "Asynchronous Common Interface Adapter": Enables the ST to directly communicate with its keyboard and with MIDI devices (two chips used). 7812.5 bit/s for keyboard, 31.250 kbit/s for MIDI.
  - MC68901 MFP "Multi Function Peripheral": Used for interrupt generation/control, serial and misc. control input signals. Atari TT030 has two MFP chips.
  - WD-1772-PH "Western Digital Floppy Disk Controller": Floppy controller chip.
  - YM2149F PSG "Programmable Sound Generator": Provides three-voice sound synthesis, also used for floppy signalling, serial control output and printer parallel port.
  - HD6301V1 "Hitachi keyboard processor": Used for keyboard scanning and mouse/joystick ports.

=== ST/ST^{F}/ST^{M}/ST^{FM} ===
As originally released in the 520ST:

- CPU: Motorola 68000 16-/32-bit CPU @ 8 MHz. 16-bit data/32-bit internal/24-bit address.
- RAM: 512 KB or 1 MB
- Display modes (60 Hz NTSC, 50 Hz PAL, 71.2 Hz monochrome):
  - Low resolution: 320 × 200 (16 color), palette of 512 colors
  - Medium resolution: 640 × 200 (4 color), palette of 512 colors
  - High resolution: 640 × 400, monochrome
- Sound: Yamaha YM2149 3-voice square wave/noise mono Programmable Sound Generator
- Drive: Single-sided 3 1/2" floppy disk drive, 360 KB capacity when formatted to standard 9 sector, 80 track layout.
- Ports: TV out (on ST-M and ST-FM models, NTSC or PAL standard RF-modulated), MIDI in/out (with 'out-thru'), RS-232 serial, Centronics parallel (printer), monitor (RGB or Composite Video color and mono, 13-pin DIN), extra disk drive port (14-pin DIN), DMA port (ACSI port, Atari Computer System Interface) for hard disks and Atari Laser Printer (sharing RAM with computer system), joystick and mouse ports (9-pin MSX standard)
- Operating System: TOS v1.00 with Graphics Environment Manager (GEM)

Very early machines have the OS on a floppy disk before a final version was burned into ROM. This version of TOS was bootstrapped from a small core boot ROM.

In 1986, most production models became ST^{F}s, with an integrated single- (520STF) or double-sided (1040STF) double density floppy disk drive built-in, but no other changes. Also in 1986, the 520ST^{M} (or 520STM) added an RF modulator for allowing the low and medium resolution color modes when connected to a TV. Later F and FM models of the 520 had a built-in double-sided disk drive instead of a single-sided one.

=== ST^{E} ===
As originally released in the 520ST^{E}/1040ST^{E}:

- All of the features of the 520STFM/1040STFM
- Extended palette of 4,096 available colors to choose from
- Blitter chip (stylized as BLiTTER) to copy/fill/clear large data blocks with a max write rate of 4 Mbytes/s
- Hardware support for horizontal and vertical fine scrolling and split screen (using the Shifter video chip)
- DMA sound chip with 2-channels stereo 8-bit PCM sound at 6.25/12.5/25/50 kHz and stereo RCA audio-out jacks (using enhancements to the Shifter video chip to support audio shifting)
- National LMC 1992 audio controller chip, allowing adjustable left/right/master volume and bass and treble EQ via a Microwire interface
- Memory: 30-pin SIMM memory slots (SIPP packages in earliest versions) allowing upgrades up to 4 MB Allowable memory sizes including only 0.5, 1.0, 2.0, 2.5 and 4.0 MB due to configuration restraints (however, 2.5 MB is not officially supported and has compatibility problems). Later third-party upgrade kits allow a maximum of 14 MB w/Magnum-ST, bypassing the stock MMU with a replacement unit and the additional chips on a separate board fitting over it.
- Ability to synchronize the video timings with an external device so that a video Genlock device can be used without having to make any modifications to computer's hardware
- Analogue joypad ports (2), with support for devices such as paddles and light pens in addition to joysticks/joypads. The Atari Jaguar joypads and Power Pad joypads (gray version of Jaguar joypads marketed for the ST^{E} and Falcon) can be used without an adapter. Two standard Atari-style digital joysticks could be plugged into each analogue port with an adapter.
- TOS 1.06 (also known as TOS 1.6) or TOS 1.62 (which fixed some major backwards-compatibility bugs in TOS 1.6) in two socketed 128 KB ROM chips.
- Socketed PLCC 68000 CPU

== Models ==
The members of the ST family are listed below, in roughly chronological order:

520ST
original model with 512 KB RAM, external power supply, no floppy disk drive. The early models had only a bootstrap ROM and TOS had to be loaded from disk.
520ST+
same as the original model 520ST, but with 1 MB of RAM,
260ST
originally intended to be a 256 KB variant, but actually had 512 KB. Sold in low numbers in Europe. Used after the release of the 520ST+ to differentiate the cheaper 512 KB models from the 1 MB models. Because the early 520STs were sold with TOS on disk, which used up 192 KB of RAM, the machine only had around 256 KB left.
520ST^{M}
a 520ST with a built-in modulator for TV output and 512 KB RAM.
520ST^{FM}
a 520STM with a redesigned motherboard in a larger case with a built-in floppy disk drive (in some cases a single-sided drive only), and 512 KB RAM (power supply inside).
520ST^{F}
a 520STFM without RF modulator
1040ST^{F}
a 520STFM with 1 MB of RAM and a built-in double-sided floppy disk drive, but without RF modulator
1040ST^{FM}
a 520STFM with 1 MB of RAM and a built-in double-sided floppy disk drive with RF modulator
Mega ST (MEGA 1, MEGA 2, MEGA 4)
redesigned motherboard with 1, 2 or 4 MB of RAM, respectively, in a much improved "pizza box" case with a detached keyboard. All MEGA mainboards have a PLCC socket for the BLiTTER chip and some early models did not include the BLiTTER chip. They also included a real-time clock and internal expansion connector. Some early MEGA 2 had a MEGA 4 mainboard with half of the memory chip places unpopulated and the MEGA 2 can be upgraded by adding the additional DRAM chips and some resistors for the control lines. The MEGA 1 mainboards had a redesigned memory chip area and could not be upgraded in this way as there are only places for the 1 MB DRAM chips.
520ST^{E} and 1040ST^{E}
a 520STFM/1040STFM with enhanced sound, a BLiTTER chip, and a 4096-color palette, in the older 1040-style all-in-one case
Mega STE
same hardware as 1040STE except for a faster 16 MHz processor with 16K cache, an onboard SCSI controller, additional faster RS232 port, VME expansion port, in an ST gray version of the TT case
STacy
a portable (but definitely not laptop) version of the ST with the complete ST keyboard, an LCD screen simulating 640x400 hi-res, and a mini-trackball intended mostly for travelers and musicians because of the backlit screen and its built-in midi ports. Originally designed to operate on 12 standard C cell flashlight batteries for portability, when Atari finally realized how quickly the machine would use up a set of batteries (especially when rechargeable batteries of the time supplied insufficient power compared to the intended alkalines), they simply glued the lid of the battery compartment shut.
ST BOOK
a later portable ST, more portable than the STacy, but sacrificing several features in order to achieve this, notably the backlight and internal floppy disk drive. Files were meant to be stored on a small amount (one megabyte) of internal flash memory 'on the road' and transferred using serial or parallel links, memory flashcards or external (and externally powered) floppy disk to a desktop ST once back indoors. The screen is highly reflective for the time, but still hard to use indoors or in low light, it is fixed to the 640 × 400 1-bit mono mode, and no external video port was provided. Despite its limitations, it gained some popularity, particularly amongst musicians.

=== Unreleased ===
The 130ST was intended to be a 128 KB variant. It was announced at the 1985 CES alongside the 520ST but never produced. The 4160ST^{E} was a 1040ST^{E}, but with 4 MB of RAM. A small quantity of development units were produced, but the system was never officially released. Atari did produce a quantity of 4160STE metallic case badges which found their way to dealers, so it's not uncommon to find one attached to systems which were originally 520/1040STE. No such labels were produced for the base of the systems.

=== Related systems ===
Atari Transputer Workstation is a standalone machine developed in conjunction with Perihelion Hardware, containing modified ST hardware and up to 17 transputers capable of massively parallel operations for tasks such as ray tracing.

=== Clones ===
Following Atari's departure from the computer market, both Medusa Computer Systems and Milan Computer manufactured Atari Falcon/TT-compatible machines with 68040 and 68060 processors. The FireBee is an Atari ST/TT clone based on the Coldfire processor. The GE-Soft Eagle is a 32 MHz TT clone.

== Peripherals ==
- SF354: Single-sided double-density 3 1/2-inch floppy drive (360 KB) with external power supply
- SF314: Double-sided double-density 3 1/2-inch floppy drive (720 KB) with external power supply
- PS3000: Combined 12-inch color monitor and 360k 3 1/2-inch floppy drive (SF354). Speaker. Manufactured by JVC in limited quantity (≈1000), only a few working models remain.
- SM124: Monochrome monitor, 12-inch screen (9.5-inch displayed image), speaker, 640 × 400 pixels, 70 Hz refresh
- SM125: Monochrome monitor, 12-inch screen, up/down/sideways swivel stand, speaker, 640x400 pixels, 70 Hz refresh
- SM147: Monochrome monitor, 14-inch screen, no speaker, replacement for SM124
- SC1224: Color monitor, 12-inch screen, 640 × 200 pixels plus speaker
- SC1425: Color monitor, 14-inch screen, One speaker on the left of screen, a jack to plug ear-listeners
- SC1435: Color monitor, 14-inch screen, stereo speakers, replacement for SC1224 (rebadged Magnavox 1CM135)
- SM195: Monochrome monitor, 19-inch screen for TT030. 1280 × 960 pixels. 70 Hz refresh
- SH204: External hard drive, 20 MB MFM drive, "shoe box" case made of metal
- SH205: External hard drive, Mega ST matching case, 20 MB MFM 3.5-inch (Tandon TM262) or 5.25-inch (Segate ST225) drive with ST506 interface (became later the Megafile 20)
- Megafile 20, 30, 60: External hard drive, Mega ST matching case, ACSI bus; Megafile 30 and 60 had a 5.25-inch RLL (often a Seagate ST238R 30 MB or Seagate ST277R 60 MB drive) with ST506 interface
- Megafile 44: Removable cartridge drive, ACSI bus, Mega ST matching case
- SLM804: Laser printer, connected through ACSI DMA port, used ST's memory and processor to build pages for printing
- SLM605: Laser printer, connected through ACSI DMA port, smaller than SLM804.

=== Satandisk ===
SatanDisk is a SD and MMC memory card adapter for Atari 16-bit computers, such as the Atari ST, invented in 2007. The objective is to replace mechanical hard drives available from Atari (SH204, SH205 and Megafile) and compatible products. The interface allows the connection of an SD or MMC card to be attached to the ACSI (hard disk) port of Atari computers, and has been tested to be compatible with TOS versions 1.02 to 2.06. The maximum supported size is 4 GB. The device appears to the system as any regular ACSI attached hard disk, but has so far only been successfully used with the proprietary and commercial HDDriver driver package.

In 2009 the developer Jookie (Miroslav NOHAJ) introduced a successor UltraSatan which supports two SD/MMC cards in parallel. The adapter features hot-plug capability of the cards and includes a battery backed up RTC chip. Additionally to the commercial HDDriver it is supported by the free ICD PRO.

== See also ==
- Bitstream Speedo Fonts – the fonts included in the Atari ST
