= Replay (TV program) =

- Genre: sports talk show
- Presented by: Russ Jackson; Bob Moir
- Country of origin: Canada
- Original language: English
- No. of seasons: 3

Production
- Producers: John Spalding (1971); Claude Baikie (1971–1973); Bob Smith (1973–1974)
- Running time: 30 minutes

Original release
- Network: CBC Television
- Release: 18 September 1971 – 27 April 1974

Replay is a Canadian sports talk show that aired on CBC Television from 1971 to 1974. It featured interviews with sports personalities and filmed segments. Recording was conducted in various Canadian cities during the series' run.

== Scheduling ==
Hour-long pilot episodes were broadcast on selected Saturdays at 4:00 p.m. (Eastern time) from April to June 1971. These were hosted by Canadian Football League player Russ Jackson and CBC sportscaster Tom McKee with guests as follows:

- 10 April 1971: Mari-Lou MacDonald (stunt performer), Doug Sanders, Derek Sanderson
- 1 May 1971: George Chuvalo, Jacques Plante, George Plimpton, Dick Thornton
- 15 May 1971, 5 June 1971: Lloyd Percival (on location at his Toronto fitness centre), Abby Hoffman, Karen Magnussen

Replay was then broadcast for three regular seasons on Saturday evenings with Jackson returning as host, while Bob Moir became his sportscaster co-host instead of McKee. These seasons aired as follows:

Time	Season run	
Time	Season start	Season end
6:30 p.m.	18 September 1971	24 June 1972
6:30 p.m.	23 September 1972	30 June 1973
7:30 p.m.	22 September 1973	27 April 1974
