= Replay Professional =

Replay Professional was a sound sampling product for the Atari ST. This was released in 1988. It consisted of a cartridge which interfaced an analog to digital converter (with 10, 12 and 14 bit variants) and software.

It included a suite of offline DSP functions Fast Fourier transform, a range of filters, so called fast (IRR) and slow (FIR) filters], MIDI sequencing and a drum machine.

Compact discs were a relatively new consumer product at that time, and the front cover used CD-like artwork, although no CD media was included and the programs themselves came on three 3.5 inch floppy disks.

== Gallery ==
Back cover

Installation discs

Manuals
