= Atari Corporation =

Former American manufacturer of home game consoles and home computers

- Formerly: Tramel Technology, Ltd.
- Type: Private
- Industry: Home computer; Video games
- Predecessor: Atari, Inc.
- Founded: May 17, 1984; 42 years ago
- Founder: Jack Tramiel
- Defunct: July 30, 1996; 30 years ago
- Fate: Merged into JT Storage; assets later acquired by Hasbro Interactive
- Successor: Atari Interactive
- Headquarters: Sunnyvale, California, U.S.
- Key people: Jack Tramiel (CEO); Sam Tramiel (president)
- Products: Atari ST; Atari 7800; Atari Portfolio; Atari Lynx; Atari Jaguar

Atari Corporation was an American manufacturer of home computers and video game consoles. It was founded by Jack Tramiel on May 17, 1984, as Tramel Technology, Ltd., but then took on the Atari name less than two months later when Warner Communications sold the home gaming and computing assets of Atari, Inc. to Tramiel.

Its chief products were the Atari ST, Atari XE, Atari 7800, Atari Lynx and Atari Jaguar; in addition to hardware, the company also published video games for its home systems and also had an in-house development team for Lynx and Jaguar software for porting, or developing original titles such as Warbirds and Trevor McFur in the Crescent Galaxy. In 1996, the company reverse merged with JTS Corp., becoming a small de facto non-operating division which itself closed after JTS sold all Atari assets to Hasbro Interactive in 1998.

== History ==
The company was founded by Commodore International's founder Jack Tramiel soon after his resignation from Commodore in January 1984. Initially named Tramel Technology, Ltd. (TTL), the company's goal was to design and sell a next-generation home computer. On July 1, 1984, TTL bought the Consumer Division assets of Atari, Inc. from Warner, and TTL was renamed Atari Corporation. Warner sold the division in exchange for $240 million in stock in the new company.

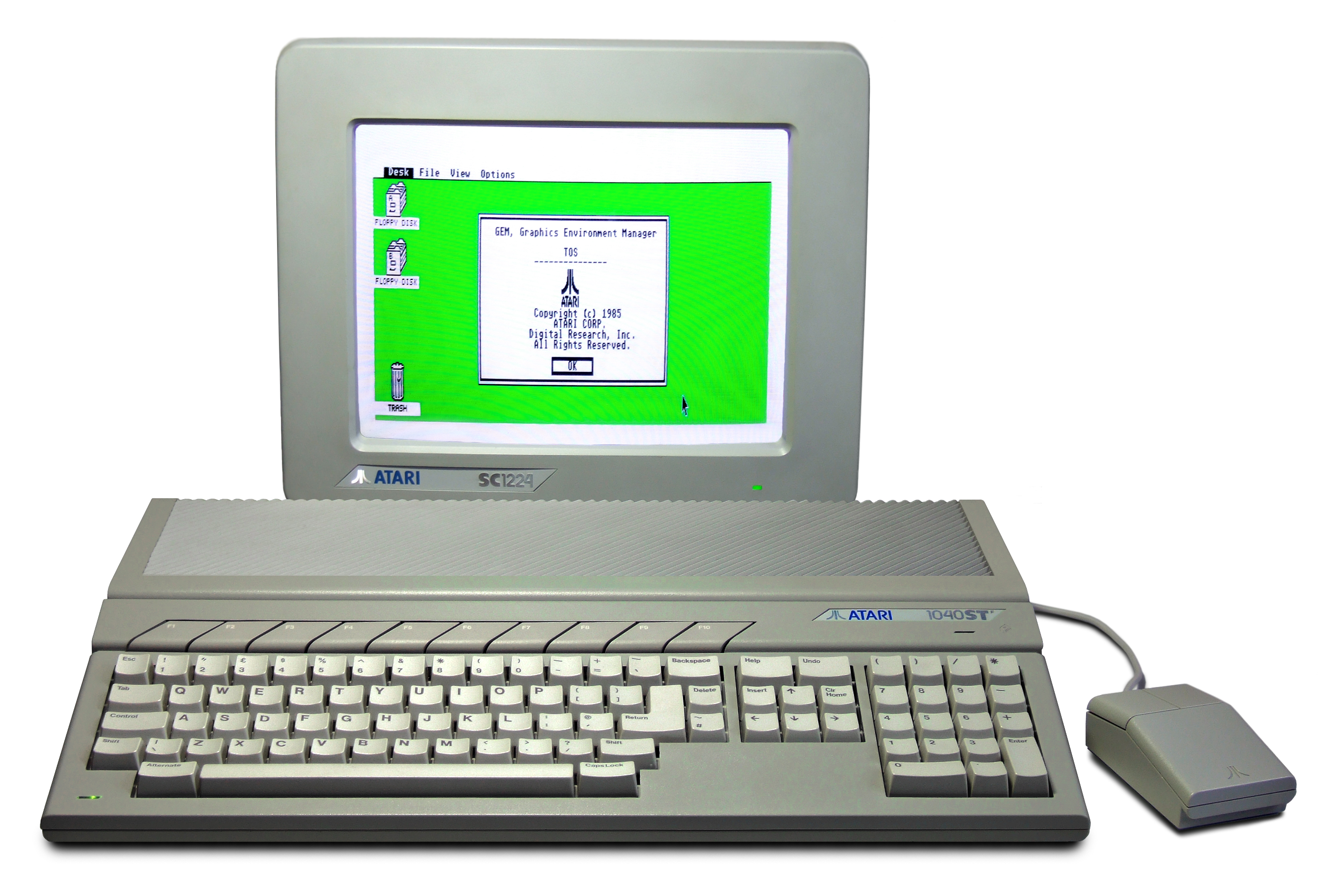
Atari 1040ST

Under Tramiel's ownership, Atari used the remaining stock of game console inventory to keep the company afloat while they finished the development of their 16-bit computer system, the Atari ST. In 1985, they released their update to the 8-bit computer line—the Atari XE series—as well as the 16-bit Atari ST line. Then in 1986, Atari Corp. launched two consoles designed when Atari was under Warner's control: Atari 2600 Jr and Atari 7800 (which had a limited release in 1984). Atari Corp. rebounded, producing a $25 million profit for 1986. The Atari ST line proved very successful (mostly in Europe, not the U.S.), ultimately selling more than 5 million units. Its built-in MIDI ports made it especially popular among musicians. Still, after initially outselling the Amiga line, its closest competitor in the marketplace, the Amiga outsold it 3 to 2 in the end.

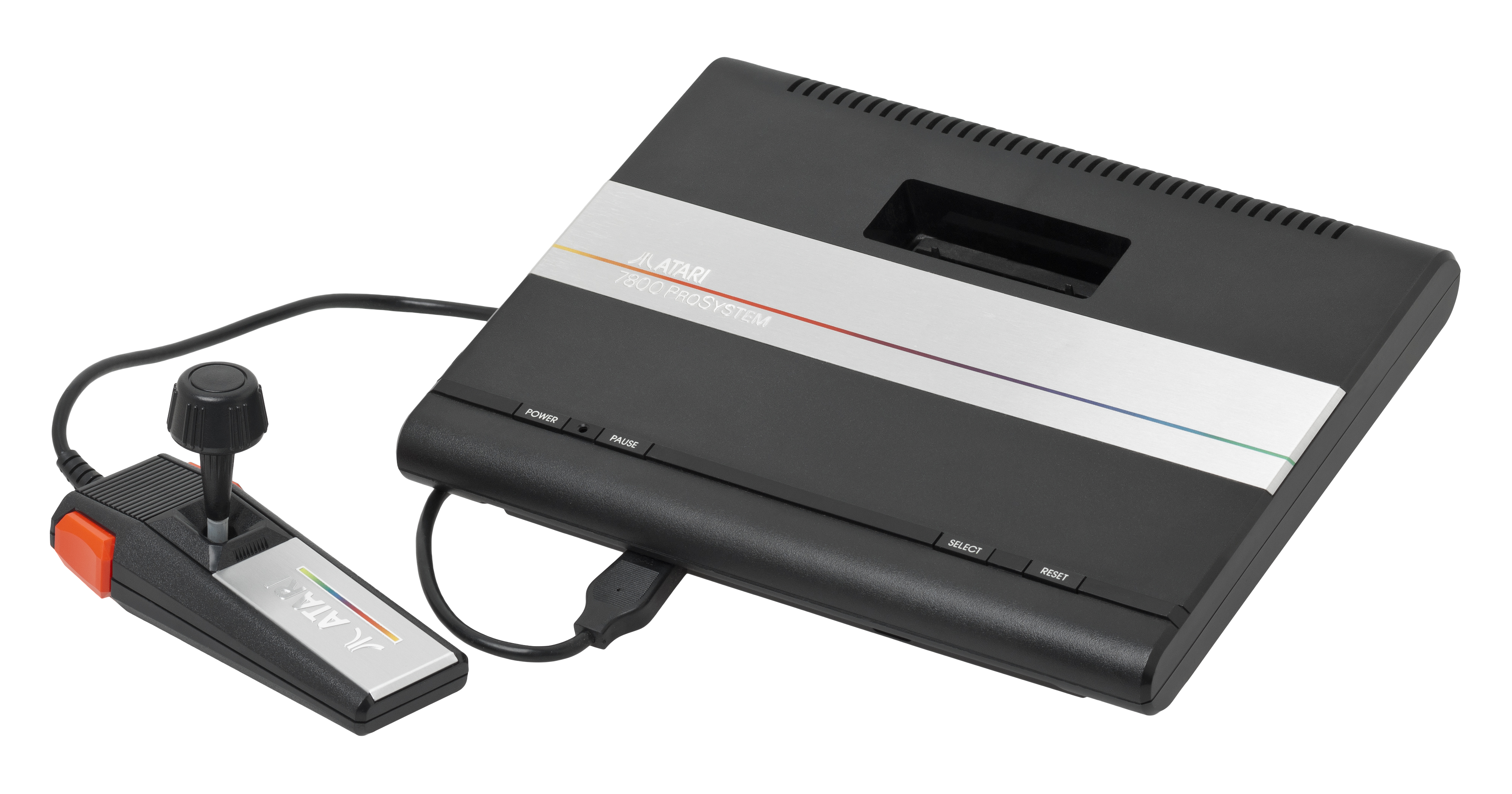
Atari 7800

Atari eventually released a line of inexpensive IBM PC compatibles, announcing a budget model at "a record-breaking price of under $599" in early 1987, to be followed by a more expandable PC-2 model at a higher price point, this being announced alongside the PC-3 in November 1987. Responding to the introduction of the low-cost Amstrad PC1512 in the UK, price points for the initial PC model were given as around £400 including VAT for a 512 KB floppy-only model supporting CGA, EGA and Hercules graphics, rising to £1000 including VAT for a hard drive model. Later, the company introduced an MS-DOS compatible palm computer called the Atari Portfolio.

Atari, under Tramiel, had a poor reputation in the marketplace. In 1986 a column Atari magazine ANALOG Computing warned that company executives seemed to emulate Tramiel's "penny-pinching'", resulting in poor customer service and documentation, and product release dates that were missed. The company, however, was much more open to the press than its predecessor Atari Inc., which had refused to let Antic preview forthcoming announcements and even opposed the magazine printing the word "Atari" on its issues.

On August 23, 1987, Atari agreed to purchase the Federated Group for $67.3 million. October 4, 1987, Atari completed the acquisition and gained full control of its own retail stores. In the final quarter of 1987, Federated lost $6.4 million in day-to-day operations. A post-acquisition audit ended on February 15, 1988, and identified $43 million in adjustments to Federated's balance sheet, far more than Atari anticipated. The net worth of its acquisition was reduced by $33 million. Atari's CFO later claimed that it would never have done the deal had it known at the time. Federated's operational losses increased, reaching $67 million for its first full year under Atari in 1988. The FBI began an investigation of Atari in May of that same year for an ongoing scheme involving the profitable import and resale of Japanese DRAM chips in the US, "in violation of U.S. import laws and contrary to import agreements". This alleged DRAM scheme was purportedly to offset the unanticipated losses in the purchase of Federated. In March 1989, Atari announced that it would treat Federated as a discontinued operation and took an additional one-time charge of $57 million. Federated was eventually sold to Silo in 1989.

In 1988, Stewart Alsop II said that Atari was among several companies that "have already been knocked out" of the GUI market by Apple, IBM/Microsoft, and others, but Atari's sales hit their peak that year, at $452 million.

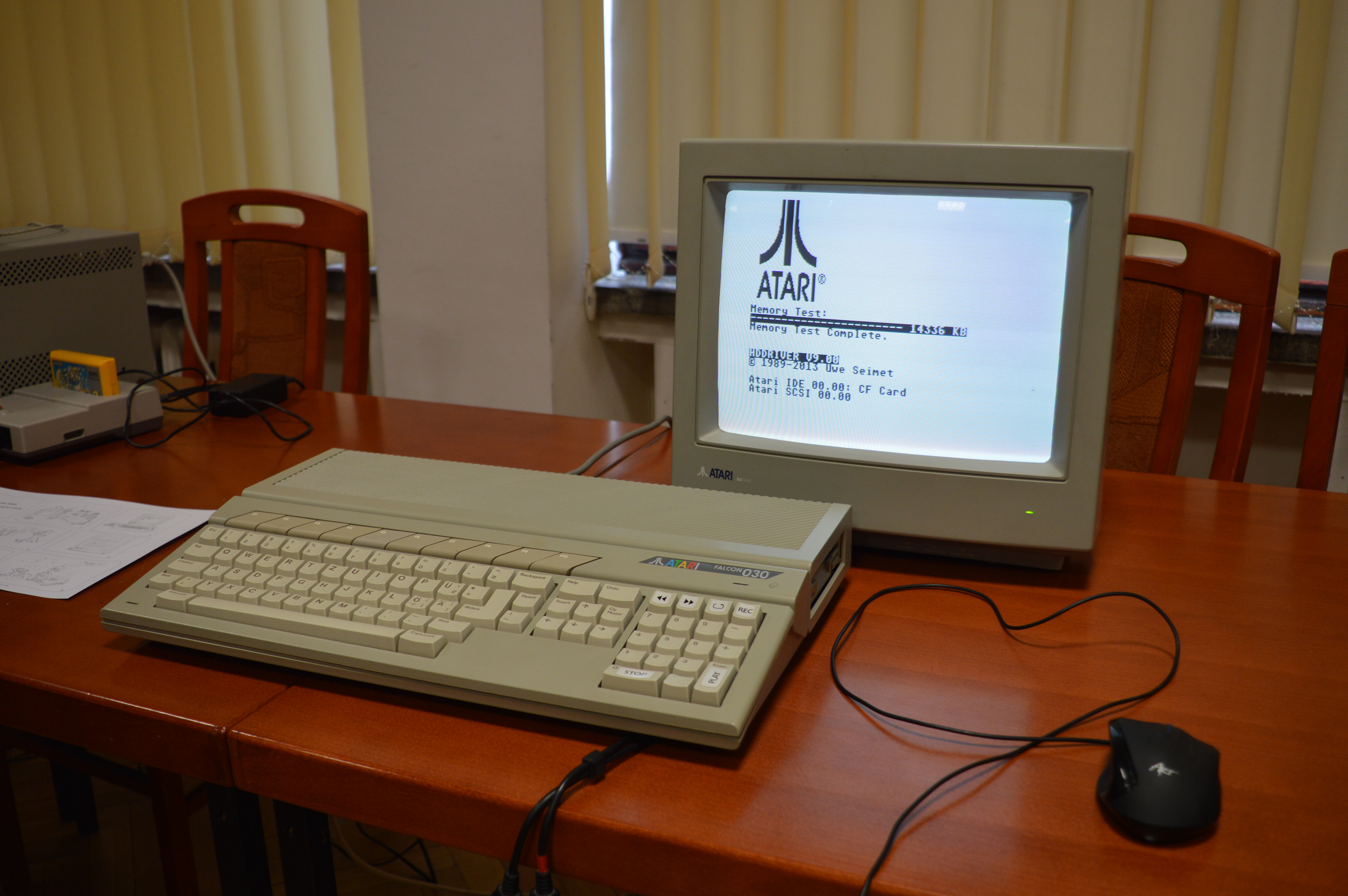
Atari Falcon 030 model from 1992

In 1989, Atari released the Lynx, a handheld console with color graphics. However, a shortage of parts kept the system from being released nationwide for the 1989 Christmas season; the Lynx lost market share to Nintendo's Game Boy, which had only a monochrome display, but a much better battery life, and was widely available.

As the fortunes of Atari's computers faded, video games again became the company's main focus. In 1993, Atari released its last console, the Jaguar. One of the first entries in the fifth generation of video game consoles, the Jaguar was marketed as the world's first 64-bit console. However, due to a games library which was low in both quantity and quality, as well as being extremely difficult to program games for the system because of its multi-chip architecture, it was unable to compete effectively against the incumbent fourth generation consoles.

Atari sustained a net loss of $49.6 million for 1995, with $27.7 million in losses during the last quarter of the year alone.

=== Decline and aftermath ===
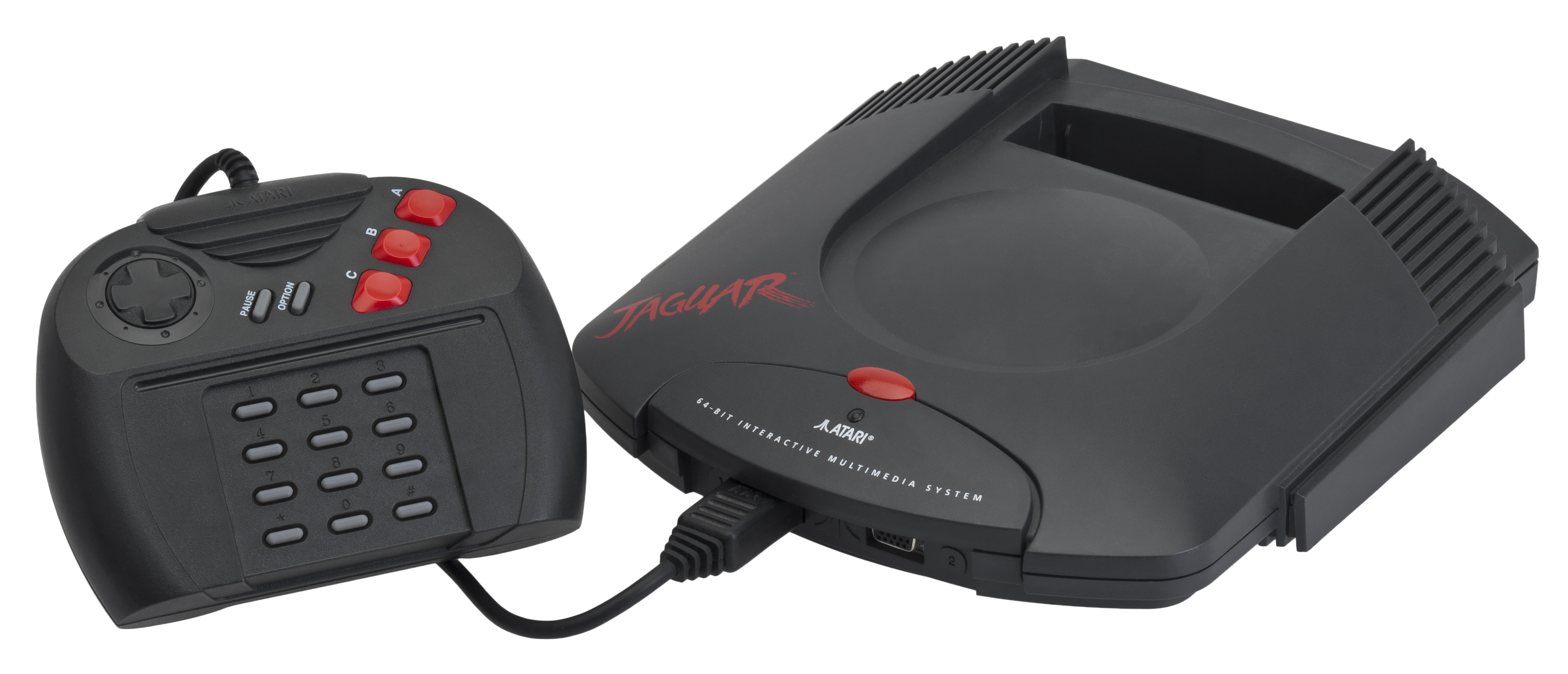
Atari Jaguar, the company's final major product

In December 1995, Sam Tramiel suffered a mild heart attack, forcing him to step down as Atari's president, causing Jack Tramiel to come back and lead the company again. On January 2, 1996, at the Winter Consumer Electronics Show, Atari Corporation formally announced the formation of a PC division, Atari Interactive, to "address the worldwide PC market". Planning to initially launch with four titles, Tempest 2000, Highlander: The Last of the MacLeods, Baldies, and FlipOut!, further releases would include Missile Command 3D, Return to Crystal Castles, Rocky Interactive Horror Show, and Virtual War. These plans did not materialize.

Despite the Jaguar being a commercial failure, by February 1996, a series of successful lawsuits followed by profitable investments left Atari with millions of dollars in its bank account but no new products to sell at all. In addition, the Tramiel family wanted out of the business. On February 13, 1996, Atari agreed to merge with JTS Inc., a short-lived maker of hard disk drives, in a reverse takeover to form JTS Corporation. The reverse merger was completed on July 30, 1996. Financially, the merge consisted of Atari's "acquisition" of JTS for approximately $112.3 million. Atari's role in the new company largely became a holder for most of its properties. Most of Atari's staff members were either dismissed or resigned, and its Atari Interactive division was quickly shut down, with the remainder of its employees being relocated to JTS's headquarters. Consequently, the Atari name almost vanished from the consumer market.

On March 13, 1998, JTS Corporation sold the Atari name and assets to Hasbro Interactive for $5 million, less than a fifth of what Warner Communications had paid 22 years earlier. The transaction primarily involved the brand and intellectual property rights, which Hasbro Interactive largely used as a brand name for retro game releases. (Note: JTS Corporation itself would file for Chapter 11 bankruptcy protection in December 1998, a filing which would ultimately be converted into Chapter 7 liquidation by the courts in January 1999.) (Note: Hasbro Interactive would announce the release of all rights to the Atari Jaguar on May 14, 1999, during that year's Electronic Entertainment Expo, opening up the platform for anyone to publish software on. The Jaguar has since gained a cult following, with many homebrew titles, as well as some unfinished games, being released.)

On January 29, 2001, Hasbro Interactive was sold to Infogrames, which renamed it Infogrames Interactive and then the Atari Interactive name in 2003. The present day Atari Interactive, through Atari SA, continues to hold and license all Atari trademarks as well as produce many new games, some based on Atari's original properties, to this day.

== List of products ==
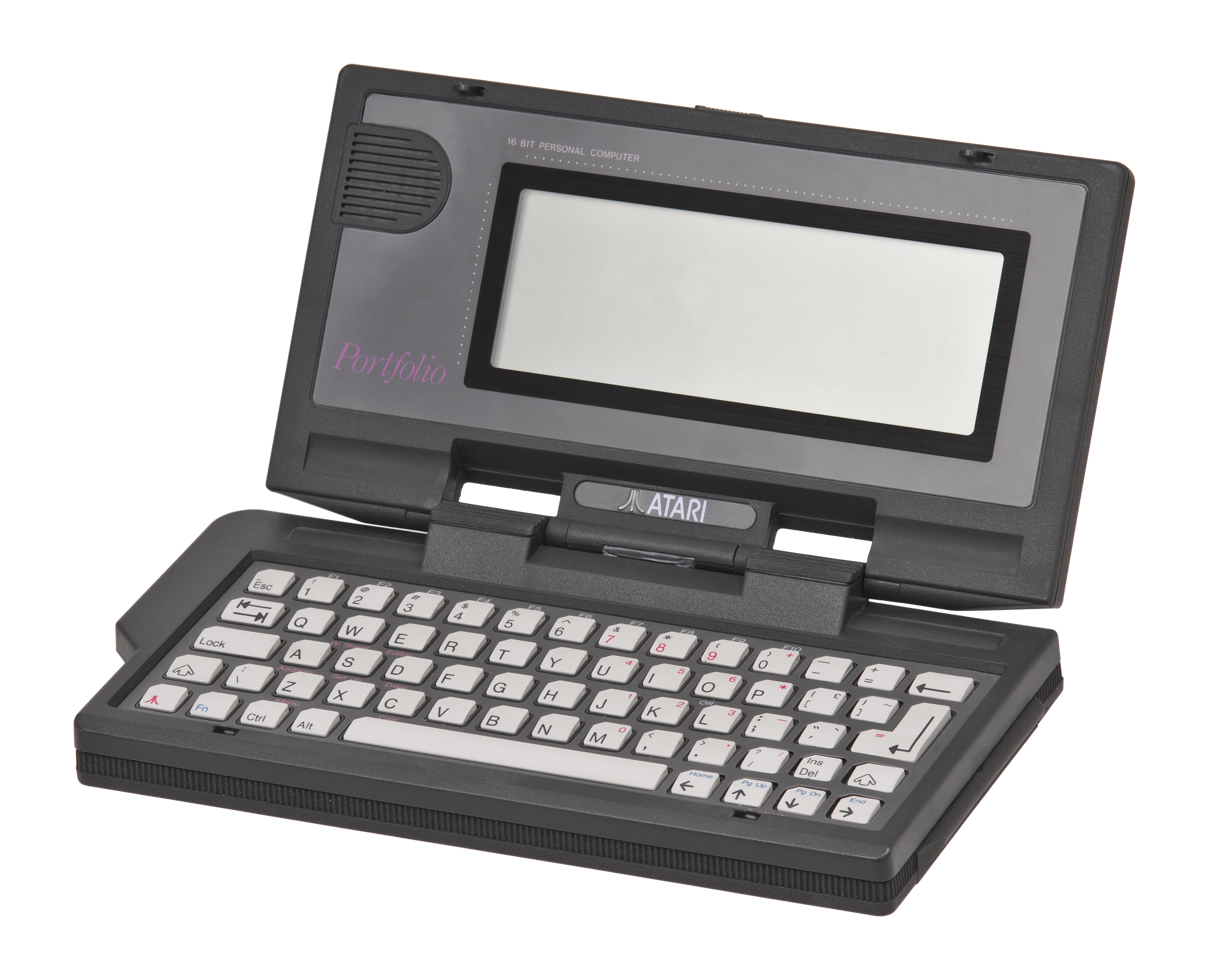
Atari Portfolio

- Atari VCS/Atari 2600 (1977)
  - "Atari 2600 Jr." (1986)
- Atari ST (1985)
  - Atari STacy (1989)
  - Atari Transputer Workstation (1989)
  - Atari TT030 (1990)
  - Atari MEGA STE (1991)
  - ST BOOK (1991)
  - Atari Falcon (1992)
- Atari XE series (1985)
  - Atari XEGS (1987)
- Atari 7800 (1986)
- Atari Portfolio (1989)
- Atari Lynx (1989)
- Atari Panther (cancelled)
- Atari Jaguar (1993)
  - Atari Jaguar CD (1995)
