= Playback (2019 film) =

2019 documentary film by Agustina Comedi

Playback is a 2019 Argentine documentary film by Agustina Comedi.

== Summary ==
In the late 1980s after an end to military dictatorship and in a tide of Catholic conservatism, a group of transgender and drag queen friends sing and perform on stage under the name "Grupo Kalas" with the only surviving member La Delpi (her friends died as the result of AIDS) reminiscing about those bygone days via archival video imagery.

== See also ==
- Another Hayride - a 2019 LGBT-related documentary also containing 1980s archival video
