= Edsel Ford Fong =

American restaurant server

Edsel Ford Fung
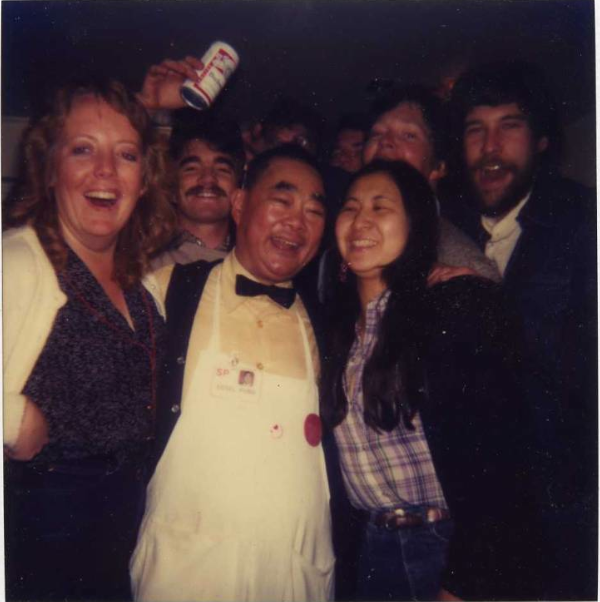
- Edsel Ford Fong with his customers in 1982
- Born: Edsel Y. Fung; May 6, 1927; San Francisco, California, US
- Died: April 24, 1984 (aged 56); San Francisco, California, US
- Occupation: Waiter
- Known for: Being described as the world's rudest waiter
- Spouse: Helen Lee (m. 1951)
- Children: 3

Edsel Ford Fung (often spelled Fong; May 6, 1927 – April 24, 1984) was an American restaurant server from San Francisco, California. He was called the "world's rudest, worst, most insulting waiter" and worked at the Sam Wo Chinese restaurant.

== Life ==
Fong was born and raised in San Francisco's Chinatown, as one of six children to Woo Yim Shee and Fung Lok, the owner of the Sam Wo Restaurant on Washington Street. (The restaurant name means "three in peace", a reference to its founding partners.) Like his two elder brothers, Fung was named after the physician who delivered him during birth, with Fung adding the middle name "Ford", in reference to Edsel Ford, later in life to claim relation to the Ford family. Through this claim, Fung met Henry Ford II, who visited the Sam Wo out of curiosity. One of his brothers, Edmund, married Corinne Kwong, the daughter of Kwang-lim Kwong, who was president of the Bank of Canton.

Fung graduated Galileo High School in 1946 and enlisted in the United States Army on 2 July 1946. After serving one year in the Regular Army as part of the Panama Canal Department, he worked for the US Postal Service before becoming a waiter at his father's restaurant. He married Helen Lee in December 1951.

As head waiter, Fong serviced the second floor of his father's restaurant, greeting visitors with an admonition to "Sit down and shut up!" He was known for calling patrons "retarded" and "fat", criticizing people's menu choices and then telling them what they should order, slamming food on the table, and complaining about receiving only 15% tips. An imposing man with a crew cut hair style, he was also notorious for seating people with strangers, forgetting orders, cursing, spilling soup on customers, hazing newcomers, refusing to provide forks or English menu translations, and busing tables before diners were finished. Long-time patrons described Fong as the "Don Rickles of restaurant" and commented "The Soup Nazi is the Dalai Lama compared to Edsel Ford Fung".

Fong was made famous by columnist Herb Caen, who often described the misanthropic Fong during his visits to Sam Wo. Caen would interview Fong on matters of local politics and gossip, then reprint Fong's Yogi Berra-like responses, which Fong would in turn proudly show to his loyal regulars. Caen included Fong in his guide of things to do in San Francisco, under "58. See the world's rudest waiter". Shirley Fong-Torres described Edsel Fong as one of the main attractions of Sam Wo in her 2008 book The Woman Who Ate Chinatown, saying that customers "came to see and be verbally abused by Edsel". Although he came across as genuinely rude, most locals seemed to agree that it was an act, his style was self-conscious and his role at the restaurant was not just to serve food but also to be a resident "entertainer" and "madman", with one longtime patron recalling him as "[not actually] rude. He was actually certifiably crazy. He didn't act that strange to locals, but the tourists got to him after a while."

Fong died at his home on Jackson Street on April 24, 1984, following brief illness. He was survived by two sons and a daughter.

== Legacy ==
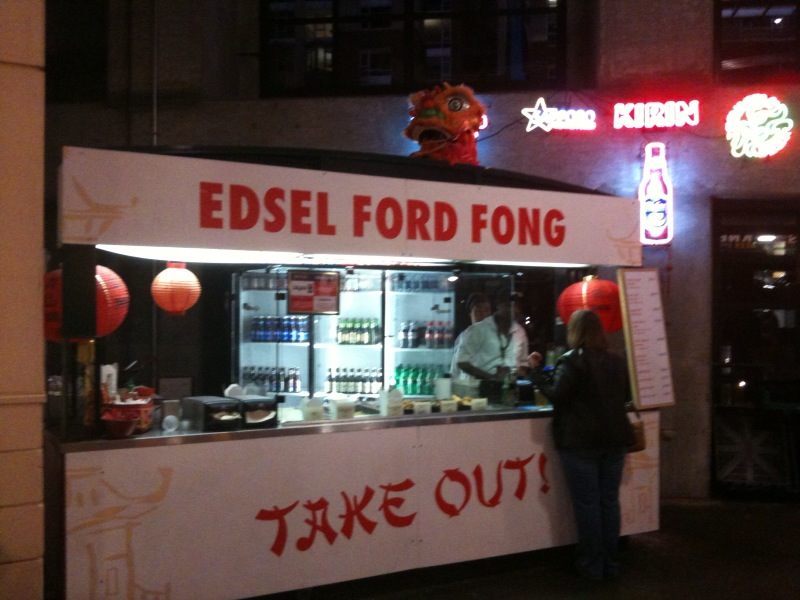
Edsel Ford Fong food stand at Oracle Park

Fong was a regular recurring character in Armistead Maupin's series of Tales of the City novels, and was played by Arsenio 'Sonny' Trinidad in the 1993 Channel 4 miniseries. Fong had a cameo in the 1981 Chuck Norris film An Eye for an Eye. Robin Williams referred to Fong in his 1997 eulogy of Herb Caen: "'Oops, she (Pamela Harriman) is missing our table, going right to God's.' I hope they have a waiter like Edsel Ford Fong who goes, 'No water here. Only wine!'" A series of club-level bistros at Oracle Park are named "Ford Fong's" in his honor. He is also memorialized by a portrait on "Gold Mountain", a mural depicting Chinese contributions to American history on Romolo Place in North Beach, a few blocks from the restaurant. He is spoken of by Jerry Kamstra in his memoir of pre-hippie San Francisco, The Frisco Kid. The Hulu original tv series Interior Chinatown features a character named Fatty Choi (played by Ronny Chieng) who is partially based on Fong imitating the same rude demeanor and poor waiter skills which only makes the shows fictional restaurant, Golden Palace, more popular.

Fong's daughter, also a waiter at Sam Wo, picked up the mantle after his death. For decades, she was rude and irascible with customers—until the closure of Sam Wo, still listed in one tourist guidebook as being where Fong practiced a "wicked sarcasm [that] took on aspects of performance art". The restaurant announced its closure in April 2012, citing the age of the building and kitchen as contributing factors. Sam Wo reopened in 2015 at a new location on Clay Street.

== See also ==
- History of Chinese Americans in San Francisco
