= Sam Wo =

Historic Chinese restaurant in San Francisco, US

Sam Wo Restaurant

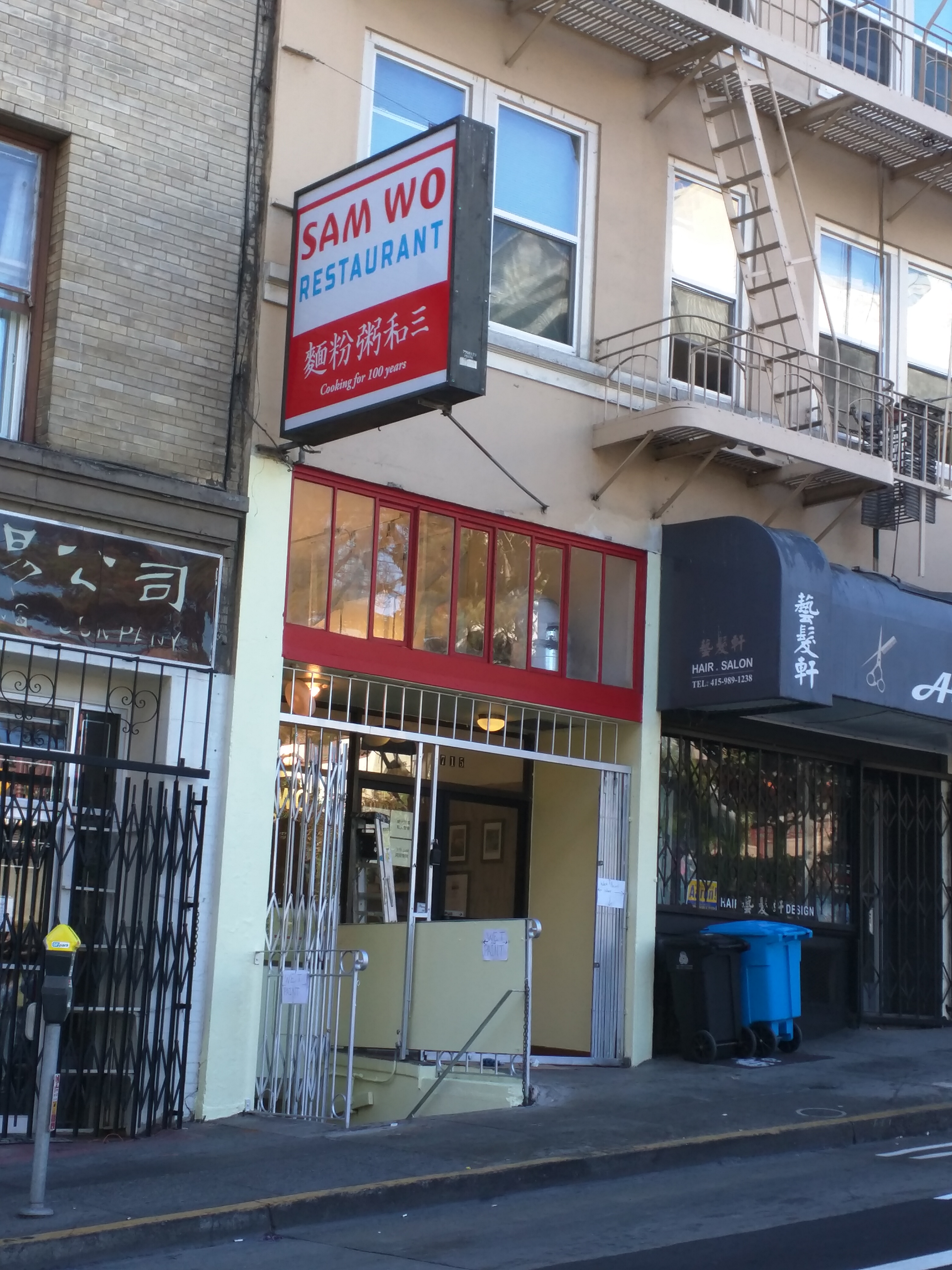
- New location of Sam Wo Restaurant (opened 2015).

- Location within San Francisco Location within San Francisco Bay Area

Restaurant information
- Established: Circa 1907–1912
- Closed: 2012–2015, 2025
- Owners: Ming Duong and Norris Song
- Previous owner: David Ho
- Location: 713 Clay Street, San Francisco, San Francisco, California, 94108
- Coordinates: 37.795034°N 122.406729°W
- Website: samworestaurant.com

Sam Wo (traditional Chinese: 三和粥粉麵; simplified Chinese: 三和粥粉面; Jyutping: Saam1wo4 zuk1 fan2min6; pinyin: Sānhé zhōu fěnmiàn, literally "Three Harmonies Porridge and Noodles") is a Chinese restaurant located in San Francisco, California. The restaurant's first location on 813 Washington Street was famous for being a venerable mainstay in the local Chinatown area, having been in the same location since 1912. Sam Wo gained notoriety in the 1960s for being the employer of Edsel Ford Fung, who was known locally as the "world's rudest waiter". The restaurant was closed in 2012 due to safety concerns, and reopened in 2015 on nearby Clay Street. It closed briefly in 2025 before reopening the same year under new management.

== History ==
There is no documented history on Sam Wo Restaurant and its early beginnings from its founding in 1912, although it was believed to be the oldest restaurant in Chinatown, built sometime around or after the 1906 San Francisco earthquake. One account states that Sam Wo had occupied the same 813 Washington Street location from 1907. Another account states that the restaurant was founded in 1908 by three Chinese siblings who had emigrated from Taishan, Guangdong. Sam Wo was primarily well known by San Francisco locals for its "famous ... no-frills, late-night food and its you-get-what-you-pay service" and 3 am closing time. In the 1950s Sam Wo was a Beat Generation hangout, featuring poets including Michael McClure, Allen Ginsberg, and Charles Bukowski.

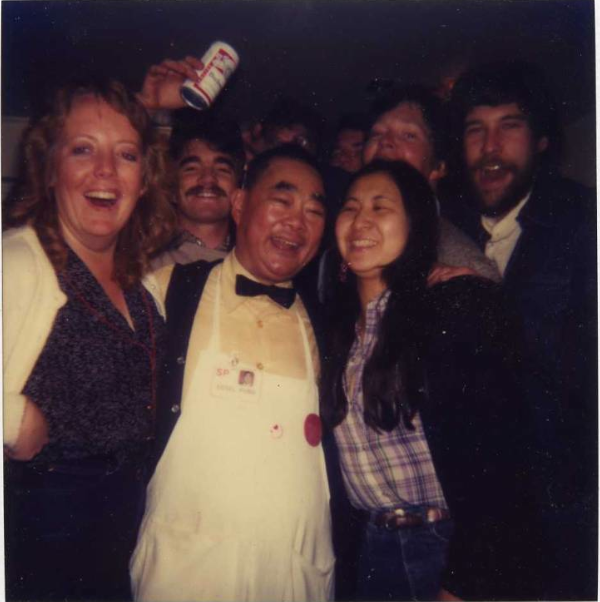
Edsel with "abused" customers in 1982.

The Sam Wo Restaurant was famed as the workplace of Edsel Ford Fung, often called the "world's rudest, worst, most insulting waiter". Fung would refuse to serve customers whose appearance he disliked and would also harass patrons that complained about mistaken orders. After his passing in 1984, he left a lasting impression for a generation of San Franciscans. Some of his signs on the Washington Street eatery remain, such as one that says "No Booze ... No Jive, No Coffee, Milk, Soft Drinks, Fortune Cookies."

=== 813 Washington ===
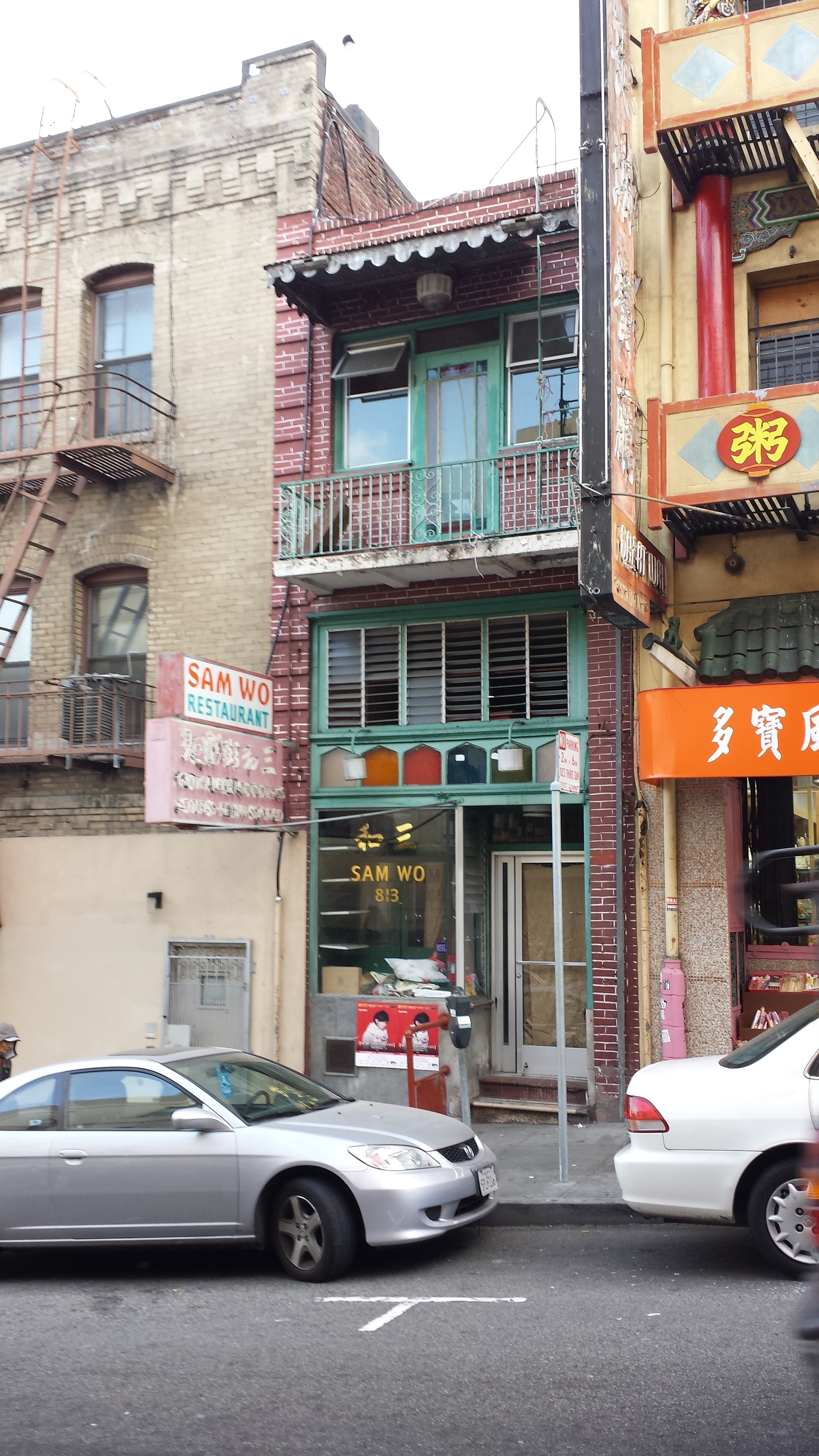
The original location of Sam Wo Restaurant, December 2013.

The unique layout of the original location at 813 Washington had patrons enter through the street-level kitchen after which they would ascend narrow stairways to dining rooms on the second and third stories. A dumbwaiter was used to deliver food to the upper floors, and patrons paid the cashier in front after dining.

Current owner David Ho emigrated to San Francisco in 1981 and began working at the restaurant, taking over ownership in 1986 after his grandfather died.

In April 2012, the San Francisco Health Department ordered the restaurant closed for rodent activity (rat feces in the kitchen) and other food safety and fire code violations. The restaurant closed on April 20. The restaurant experienced lines out the door on its last day of operation. With Sam Wo closed, late-night dining in Chinatown came to an end, punctuating a decline that had begun in 1977 with the Golden Dragon Massacre, accelerated after the 1989 Loma Prieta earthquake which damaged the Embarcadero Freeway, the main route into Chinatown, and intensified after street sweeping was moved to 2 a.m., which caused many late-night diners to receive parking tickets.

It's sort of like going back in time. I suspect the kitchen hasn't been remodeled since the '40s. It's not sustaining safe practices.

— Lisa O'Malley, Supervisor, San Francisco Department of Public Health, San Francisco Chronicle article, 20 April 2012

Nevertheless, owner David Ho promised to develop a remediation plan and then reopen. A representative for the health department expressed hope stating, "...people are so very loyal to that restaurant, and San Francisco is a city where nothing goes down easy. I'm hoping for the best ..." Generally the main problem cited by all the parties involved was the facilities were too old and expensive modernization was needed. At a subsequent hearing on April 24, Ho listened to the "long history of repeat health code violations" and immediate actions to remedy them listed by city inspectors, which included the need for a commercial refrigeration unit; separate sinks for hand washing, dish washing, and food preparation; eliminating rodents; fixing the fire escape; and removing excessive extension cords. The hearing was attended by more than one hundred supporters of the restaurant, and Julie Ho, David's daughter, said "it won't be days and it won't be years — a month or two, probably" before they could reopen. Despite the expense required to revamp the century-old restaurant, the restaurant's landlord expressed support for keeping the restaurant open, although the restaurant's lease was due to expire in October 2012.

Working with the Chinatown Community Development Center, the owner and the Department of Building Inspection agreed on the renovations required to bring the building up to modern codes. The estimated cost of implementing the remodel was $100,000 in September 2012, and a fundraiser was scheduled by the Save Sam Wo Coalition. One year later, the estimated cost of remodeling had soared to $300,000 in September 2013. The extra expense, coupled with unfavorable lease cost and timing, meant that Sam Wo was unable to reopen in its original location. When Ho and community supporters had nearly raised enough money, the building's owner announced the space at 813 Washington had been leased to a planned spa business. Ho trademarked the Sam Wo name to ensure that no one else could open a Sam Wo restaurant.

=== 713 Clay ===
A long time ago, [Sam Wo's] was built from something bad [the 1906 earthquake], and something nice blossomed from it. The restaurant blooming again is something to look forward to.

— David Ho, owner of Sam Wo, San Francisco Chronicle article, 2 October 2015

In 2014, the management announced on Facebook that Sam Wo would return, taking over the space formerly occupied by Anna Bakery, offering the same amenities and baked goods to Anna Bakery's longtime patrons, and planning to reopen in July 2015. The restaurant finally reopened at a new location on October 21, 2015. The new location at 713-715 Clay Street features a basement kitchen, mezzanine level, and dumbwaiter to recreate some of the quirks of the old space.

The new Sam Wo was reviewed in December 2015 by Michael Bauer of the San Francisco Chronicle, who said "[the new space] feels like it's been there for decades, but those in the know can see this is a sanitized, spruced-up version. Fortunately it retains its special character and will begin to feel even more like the original when the windows fog over with layers of grease and the already well-worn stools become as creaky as their predecessors."

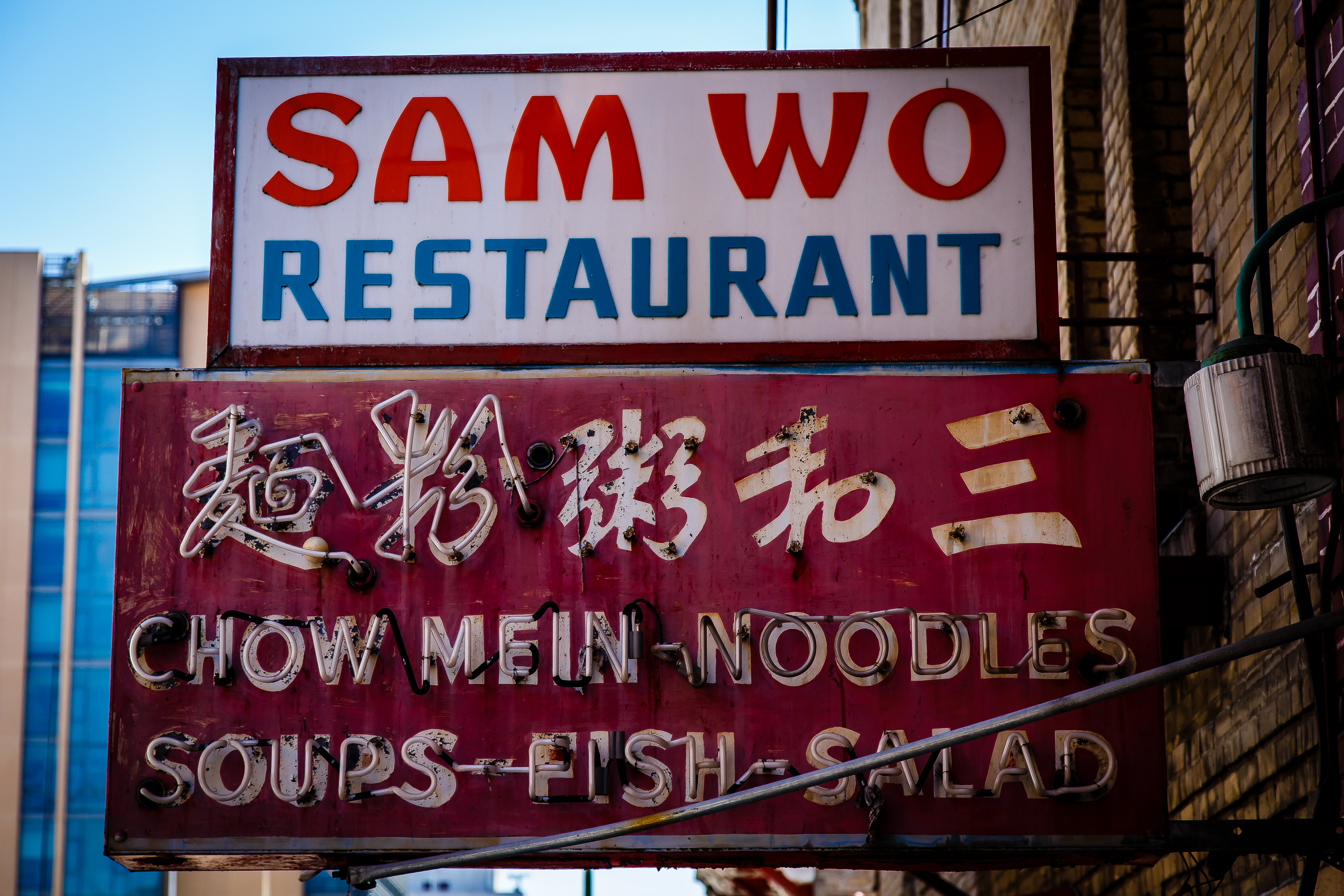
The iconic Sam Wo neon sign (in 2014, at 813 Washington)

In April 2016, the neon sign (originally installed in the 1930s, but with the neon tubes unlit since the 80s) was moved to the new location at 713 Clay. The hours at the new location were extended to 3 a.m. on Friday and Saturday nights in May 2016, matching the restaurant's legacy hours.

The restaurant closed in January 2025 when chef and co-owner David Ho retired. It re-opened in September 2025 under new management.

== Media legacy ==
Sam Wo was immortalized in multiple media reports throughout the years. Some notable examples include author Armistead Maupin, journalist Herb Caen, and late night talk show host Conan O'Brien (featuring a cameo by Martha Stewart) in their various reports of the experiences with the eatery. Shirley Fong-Torres described Sam Wo and Edsel Fung as one of the main attractions in her 2008 book The Woman Who Ate Chinatown, saying that customers "came to see and be verbally abused by Edsel."

California poet Gary Snyder recommends "congee at Sam Wo" among other "Things to Do Around San Francisco" in his book Mountains and Rivers Without End.

Sam Wo in San Francisco is unconnected to the like-named Sam Wo restaurant that once operated in New York City's Chinatown, the latter well-known from its mention in the 1979 Woody Allen film Manhattan.

== See also ==
- History of the Chinese Americans in San Francisco
