= Herb Caen =

American newspaper columnist (1916–1997)

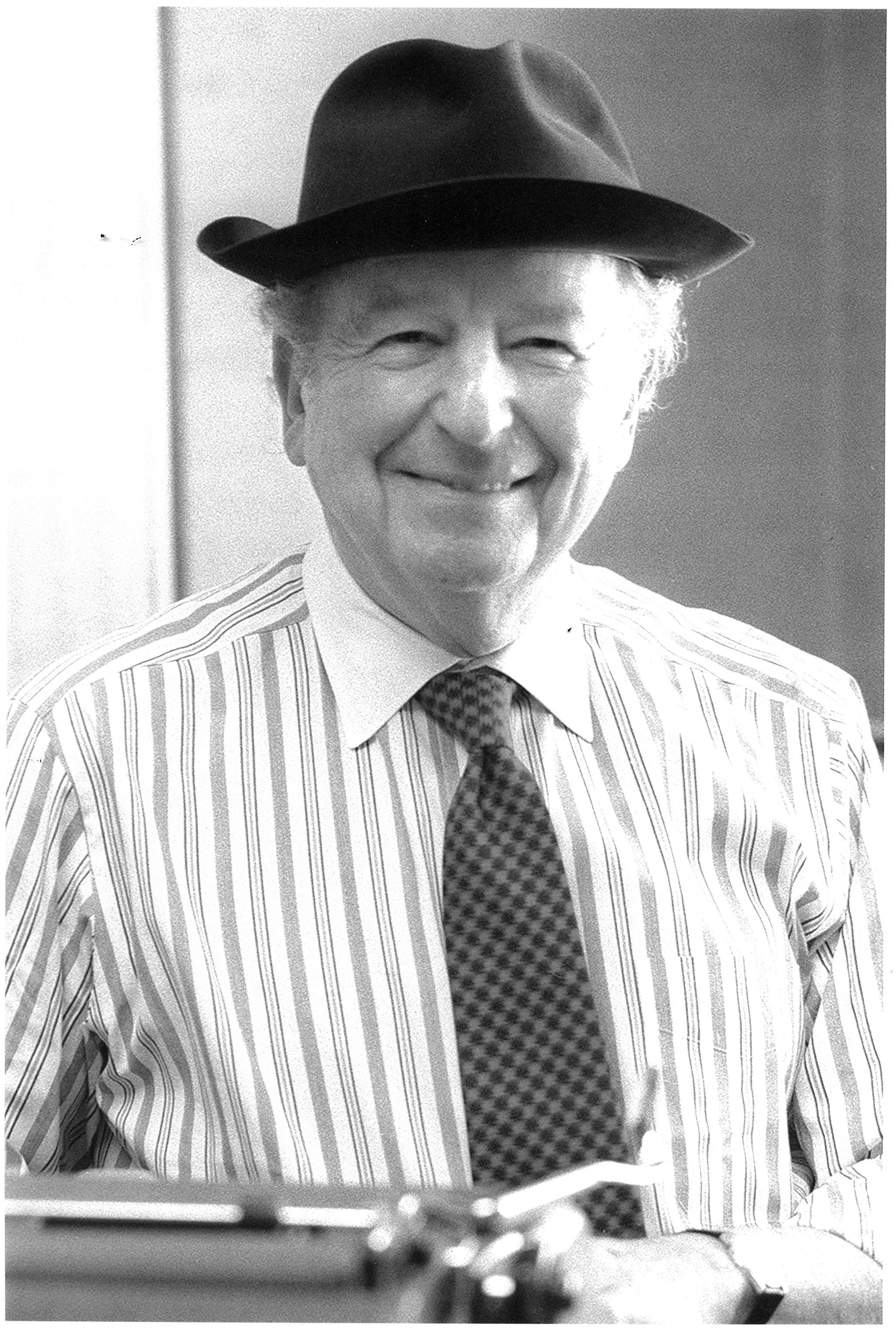
- Caen in 1994
- Born: Herbert Eugene Caen; April 3, 1916; Sacramento, California, U.S.
- Died: February 1, 1997 (aged 80); San Francisco, California, U.S.
- Occupation: Columnist

Herbert Eugene Caen (/keɪn/; April 3, 1916 – February 1, 1997) was a San Francisco humorist and journalist whose daily column of local goings-on and insider gossip, social and political happenings, and offbeat puns and anecdotes—"A continuous love letter to San Francisco"—appeared in the San Francisco Chronicle for almost sixty years (excepting a relatively brief defection to The San Francisco Examiner) and made him a household name throughout the San Francisco Bay Area.

"The secret of Caen's success", wrote the editor of a rival publication, was:

his outstanding ability to take a wisp of fog, a chance phrase overheard in an elevator, a happy child on a cable car, a deb in a tizzy over a social reversal, a family in distress and give each circumstance the magic touch that makes a reader an understanding eyewitness of the day's happenings.

A special Pulitzer Prize called him the "voice and conscience" of San Francisco.

== Early life and career ==
This San Francisco skyline (featuring a "flaccid" Transamerica Pyramid) headed Caen's columns from 1976 until his death.

Herbert Eugene Caen was born April 3, 1916, in Sacramento, California, to a Jewish father and a non-Jewish mother, but he liked to point out that his parents‍—‌pool hall operator Lucien Caen and Augusta (Gross) Caen‍—‌had spent the summer nine months previous at the Panama Pacific International Exposition in San Francisco. After high school (where he wrote a column titled "Corridor Gossip") Caen covered sports for The Sacramento Union; in later years he occasionally referred to himself as "the Sacamenna Kid".

In 1936, Caen began writing a radio programming column for the San Francisco Chronicle. When that column was discontinued in 1938, Caen proposed a daily column on the city itself; "It's News to Me" first appeared July 5. Excepting Caen's four years in the United States Army Air Forces during World War II and a 1950–1958 stint at The San Francisco Examiner, his column appeared every day except Saturday until 1990, when it dropped to five times per week‍—‌"more than 16,000 columns of 1,000 words each ... an astounding and unduplicated feat, by far the longest-running newspaper column in the country".

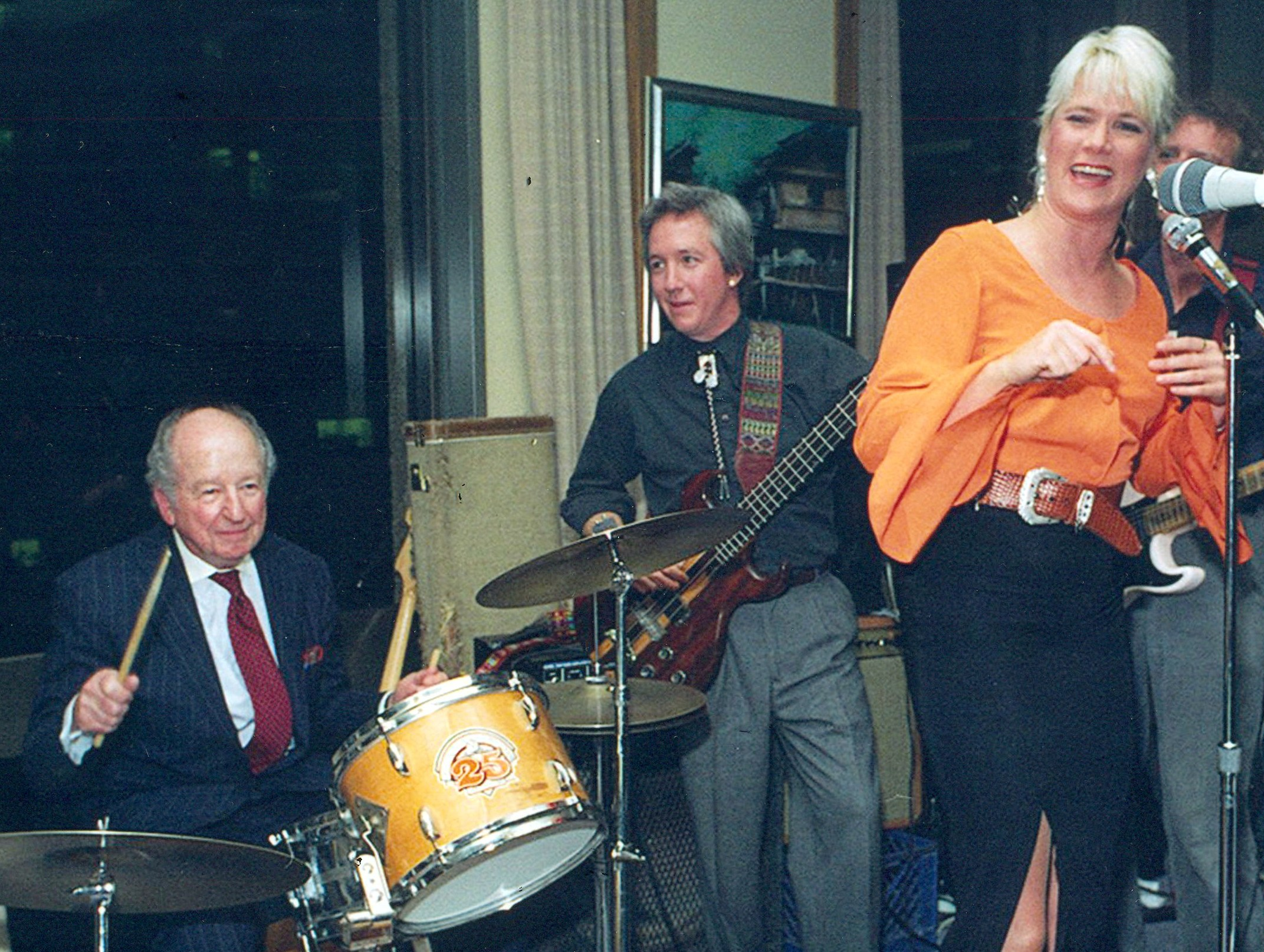
Caen playing the drums at the 1993 celebration of The Paris Review's 40th anniversary

A colleague wrote in 1996:

What makes him unique is that on good days his column offers everything you expect from an entire newspaper‍—‌in just 25 or so items, 1,000 or so words ... Readers who turned to Herb on Feb. 14, 1966, learned that Willie Mays' home was on the market for $110,000. The Bank of America now owned the block where it wanted to build its headquarters. Dr. Zhivago director David Lean was in town. Meanwhile, "Mike Connolly is ready to concede that the situation in Vietnam is complex: 'Even my cab driver can't come up with a solution.'"

Caen had considerable influence on popular culture, particularly its language. He coined the term beatnik in 1958 and popularized hippie during San Francisco's 1967 Summer of Love. He popularized obscure‍—‌often playful‍—‌terms such as Frisbeetarianism, and ribbed nearby Berkeley as Berserkeley for its often-radical politics. His many recurring if irregular features included "Namephreaks"‍—‌people with names (aptronyms) peculiarly appropriate or inappropriate to their vocations or avocations, such as substitute teacher Mr. Fillin, hospital spokesman Pam Talkington, periodontist Dr. Rott, piano teacher Patience Scales, orthopedic specialist Dr. Kneebone, and the Vatican's spokesman on the evils of rock 'n roll, Cardinal Rapsong.

Among the colorful personalities making periodic appearances in Caen's columns was Edsel Ford Fung, whose local reputation as "the world's rudest waiter" was due in no small part to Caen, who lamented his death in 1984:

SOME WOE around Sam Wo, the skinny three-story restaurant on Washington near Grant. Waiter (and one-time part owner) Edsel Ford Fung, who became famous for berating and insulting the customers, all with tongue in cheek, died Tuesday at age 55, and the skinny old eating place is in mourning. The wondrously named and actually quite charming Edsel was the son of Fung Lok, a former owner of Sam Wo, who named his sons Edsel, Edmund and Edwin‍—‌after the first names of the Caucasian doctors who delivered them. Edsel, always a fellow with a flair, added the Ford and hinted broadly that he was related to the auto family; an amused Henry Ford II made a special trip to Sam Wo to check out the rumor ... By the way, there is no Sam Wo at Sam Wo. The name means something analogous to "Three Happiness," but there is only sadness there this week.

Although Caen relied on "an army of reliable tipsters", all items were fact-checked.

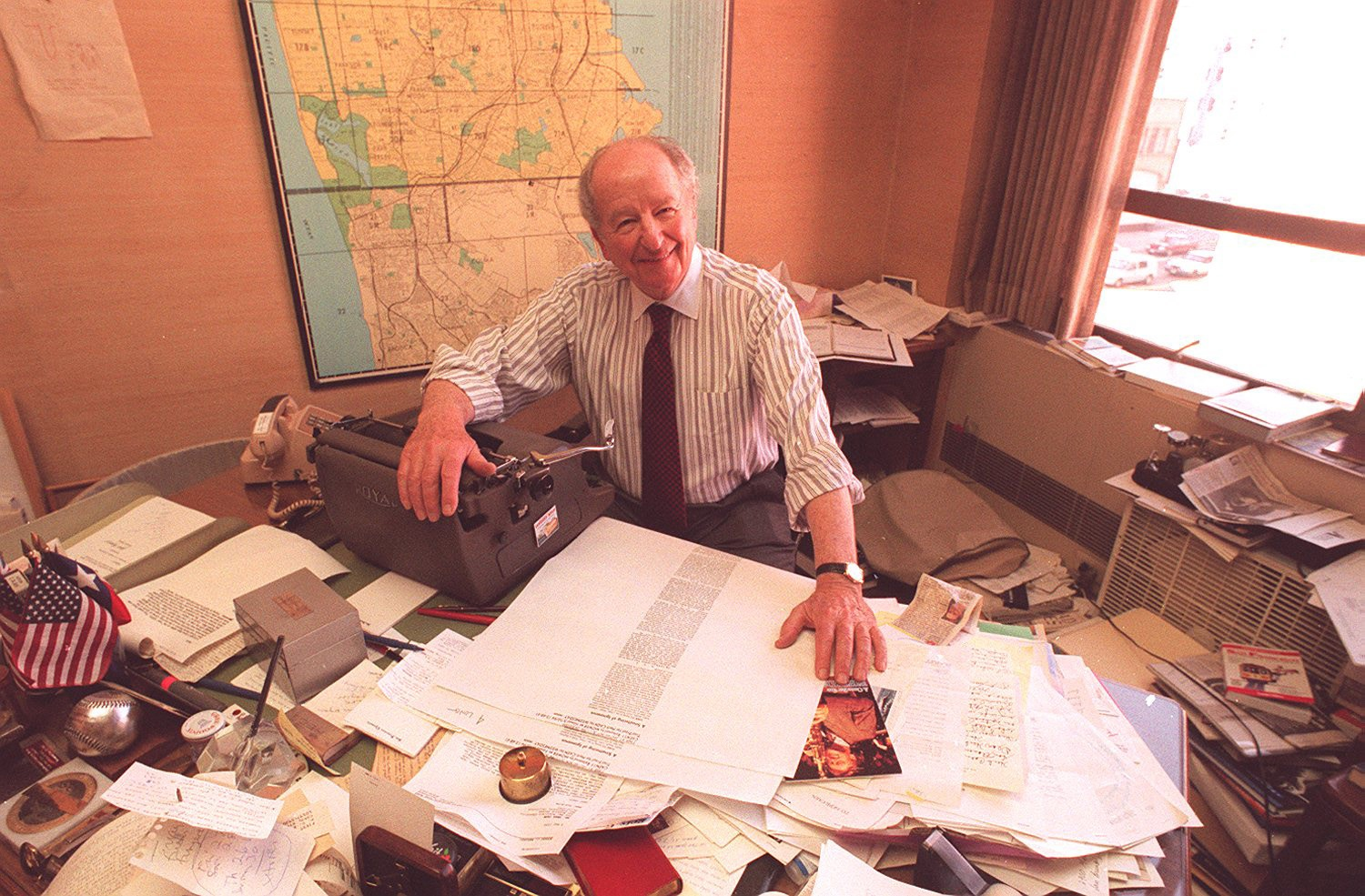
"Mr. San Francisco" in his Chronicle office in the early 1990s

Now and then an item (usually a joke or pun) was credited to a mysterious "Strange de Jim", whose first contribution ("Since I didn't believe in reincarnation in any of my other lives, why should I have to believe in it in this one?") appeared in 1972. Sometimes suspected to be a Caen alter ego, de Jim (whose letters bore no return address, and who met Caen only once‍—‌by chance) was revealed after Caen's death to be a Castro District writer who, despite several coy interviews with the press, remains publicly anonymous.

Caen took special pleasure in "seeing what he could sneak by his editors‍—‌his 'naughties,'" such as this item about a shopper looking for a Barbie doll: "'Does Barbie come with Ken?' he asked the perky saleswoman. 'Actually no,' she answered slyly. 'Barbie comes with G.I. Joe‍—‌she fakes it with Ken.'"

On Sundays, current items were set aside in favor of "Mr. San Francisco's" reflections on his unconditional love for his adopted city, musing on (for example):

The crowded garages and the empty old buildings above them, the half-filled nightclubs and the overfilled apartment houses, the saloons and the skies and the families huddled in the basements, the Third Street panhandlers begging for handouts in front of pawn shops filled with treasured trinkets, the great bridges and the rattle-trap street cars, the traffic that keeps moving although it has no place to go, thousands of newcomers glorying in the sights and sounds of a city they suddenly decided to love instead of leave.

An occasional column was given over to serious matters, such as a May 1, 1960, piece on the upcoming execution of Caryl Chessman, which included Caen's recollection of witnessing a hanging as a young reporter:

Suddenly the door behind the scaffold swung open and the nightmare scene was enacted in a flash. The murderer, his arms bound, was hustled roughly onto the trapdoor, the noose was slammed around his neck, a black mask dropped over his unbelieving face, the trapdoor clanged open, the body shot through and stopped with a sickening crack. For an eternity, the victim twitched in spasm after spasm, and one by one the witnesses began fainting around me. "Doesn't hurt a bit," the warden had said.

And from that day on, having been made properly aware of the State's awful vengeance, no holdup man ever again killed a shopkeeper? You bet.

On December 12, 1960, Caen wrote:

While you're making out your Christmas cards, you might remember to send one to Francis Gary Powers, c/o American Embassy, Moscow, USSR. Let him know that U-2 haven't forgotten.

Powers received almost a hundred cards, most from the San Francisco Bay Area.

A collection of essays, Baghdad-by-the-Bay (a term he had coined to reflect San Francisco's exotic multiculturalism) was published in 1949, and Don't Call It Frisco‍—‌after a local judge's 1918 rebuke to an out-of-town petitioner ("No one refers to San Francisco by that title except people from Los Angeles")‍—‌appeared in 1953. (Note: In 1995 two escapees from a Utah prison were arrested by police in Berkeley, California after telling officers they were "from Frisco". "It made our officers suspicious", said a police official. "No one from [the San Francisco area] ever says that.") The Cable Car and the Dragon, a children's picture book, was published in 1972.

In 1993, he told an interviewer that he declined to retire because "my name wouldn't be in the paper and I wouldn't know if I was dead or alive," adding that his obituary would be his last column: "It will trail off at the end, where I fall face down on the old Royal with my nose on the 'I' key."

== Honors and death ==
If I do go to heaven, I'm going to do what every San Franciscan does who goes to heaven. He looks around and says, "It ain't bad, but it ain't San Francisco."

— Herb Caen

In April 1996 Caen received a special Pulitzer Prize (which he called his Pullet Surprise) for "extraordinary and continuing contribution as a voice and conscience of his city." (Fellow Chronicle columnist Art Hoppe, who had sworn an oath with Caen twenty-five years earlier not to accept a Pulitzer, released him from the oath without being asked.) The following month doctors treating him for pneumonia discovered he had inoperable lung cancer. He told his readers: "In a lightning flash I passed from the world of the well to the world of the unwell, where I hope to dwell for what I hope is a long time. The point is not to be maudlin or Pollyanna cheerful. This is serious stuff."

June 14, 1996, was officially celebrated in San Francisco as Herb Caen Day. After a motorcade and parade ending at the Ferry Building, Caen was honored by "a pantheon of the city's movers, shakers, celebrities and historical figures" including television news legend Walter Cronkite. Noting that several San Francisco mayors (sitting or retired) were at liberty to attend, Caen quipped, "Obviously, the Grand Jury hasn't been doing its job."

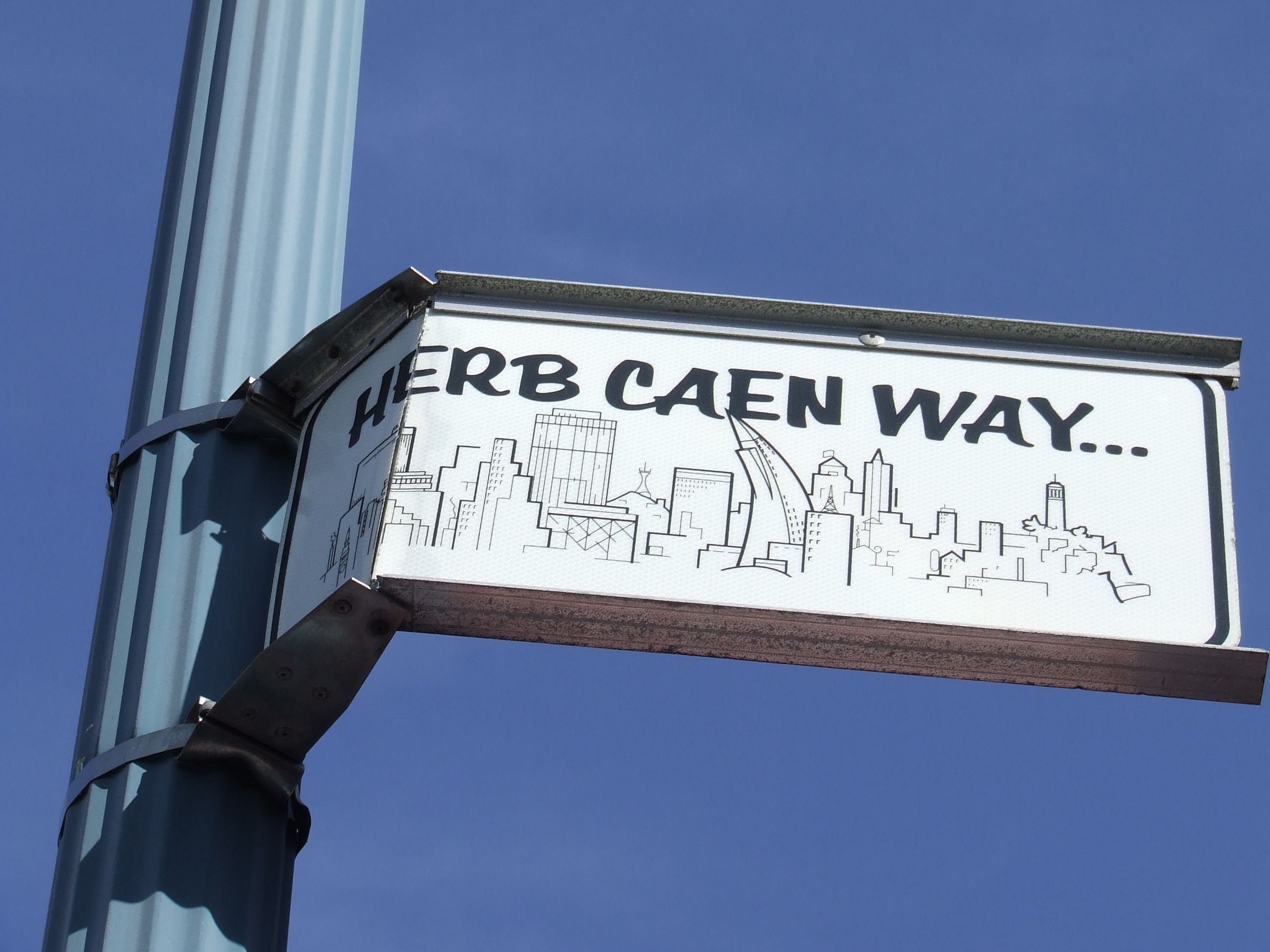

Among other honors a promenade along the city's historic bayfront Embarcadero was christened "Herb Caen Way..."—a reference to what Caen called his "three-dot journalism" for the ellipses separating his column's short items. This was particularly appropriate given the recent demolition of an eyesore against which Caen had long campaigned: the elevated Embarcadero Freeway, built astride the Embarcadero forty years earlier and derided by Caen as "The Dambarcadero". A tribute was inserted in the Congressional Record.

Caen continued to write, though less frequently. He died February 1, 1997. His funeral‍—‌held at Grace Cathedral despite his Jewish heritage ("the damndest saddest, most wonderful funeral anyone ever had, but the only man who could properly describe it isn't here," said close friend Enrico Banducci)‍—‌ was followed by a candlelight procession to Aquatic Park, where his will had provided for a fireworks display—climaxed by a pyrotechnic image of the manual typewriter he had long called his "Loyal Royal".

"No other newspaper columnist ever has been so long synonymous with a specific place ... Part of his appeal seemed to lie in the endless bonhomie he projected," said his New York Times obituary, comparing him to Walter Winchell "but with the malice shorn off".

The Chronicle projected a one-fifth decline in subscriptions—surveys had shown that Caen was better-read than the front page. Reprints of his columns remain a periodic feature of the Chronicle.

== Bibliography ==
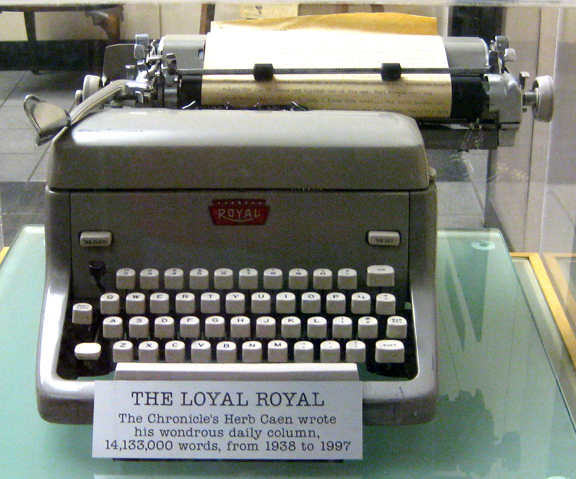
One of Caen's four "Loyal Royals" on display at the Chronicle offices

- The San Francisco Book, Photographs by Max Yavno, Houghton Mifflin Company, Boston/The Riverside Press, Cambridge, 1948.
- Baghdad by the Bay, Garden City, NY: Doubleday & Company, 1949.
- Baghdad: 1951, Doubleday & Company, Inc., Garden City, N.Y., 1950.
- Don't Call It Frisco, Garden City, NY: Doubleday & Company, 1953.
- Herb Caen's Guide to San Francisco, Doubleday & Company, Inc., Garden City, New York, 1957.
- Only in San Francisco, Doubleday & Company, Inc., Garden City, N.Y., 1960.
- San Francisco: City on Golden Hills, illustrated by Dong Kingman, Doubleday & Company, Inc., Garden City, New York, 1967.
- The Cable Car and the Dragon, illustrated by Barbara Ninde Byfield. Doubleday (1972), reprinted by Chronicle Books (1986) (children's picture book)
- ’’One Man’s San Francisco’’, Doubleday & Company Inc., Garden City, New York, 1976.
- Above San Francisco, with Robert Cameron. Aerial photographs of historic and contemporary San Francisco, with text by Caen. (1986)
