= FreeGEM =

1999 windowing system

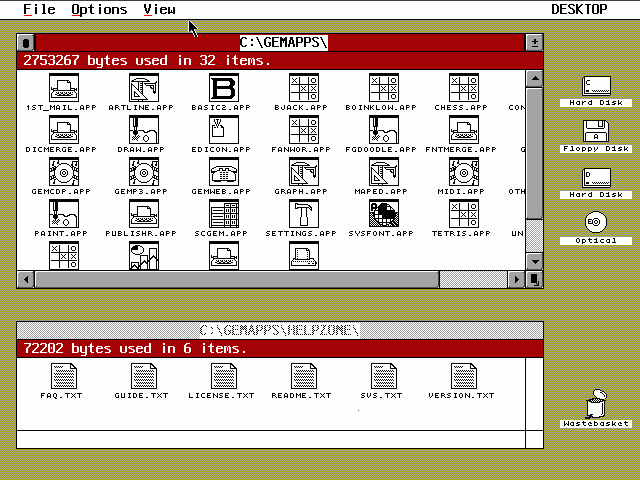
- OpenGEM showing hard disk and CD-ROM icons (to the right)
- Developer: Caldera Thin Clients
- Release: 1999; 27 years ago
- Operating system: DOS
- Available in: English
- Type: Windowing system
- License: GPL-2.0-only

FreeGEM released in 1999 is a windowing system based on Digital Research's GEM which was first released in 1985. GEM stands for "Graphics Environment Manager".

== Overview ==
FreeGEM is the free software/open source version of GEM developed after Caldera Thin Clients released the GEM code under the terms of the GNU GPL-2.0-only free software license in April 1999. Caldera Thin Clients owned the source code to GEM through Caldera's purchase of the remaining Digital Research assets from Novell on 23 July 1996, who had acquired Digital Research in June 1991.

The FreeGEM binaries and source code are available in one package through the OpenGEM SDK. The OpenGEM SDK also contains language bindings, documentation, and compilers. Other distributions include Owen's FreeGEM Distribution.

== OpenGEM ==
OpenGEM is a non-multitasking 16-bit graphical user interface (GUI) for DOS. It is an extended distribution of FreeGEM that includes features of the original Digital Research GEM.

OpenGEM is intended to provide a simple to install and use GUI system and windowing framework for the FreeDOS operating system.

Caldera Thin Clients (later known as Lineo), who owned the source code to GEM through Caldera's purchase of the remaining Digital Research assets from Novell on 23 July 1996, released the source to GEM under the terms of GPL-2.0-only in April 1999. OpenGEM was developed by Shane Martin Coughlan in collaboration with the FreeGEM Developer team, and is free software released under the terms of the GPL-2.0-only. OpenGEM versions 3 through 6 are hosted on SourceForge and on the FreeDOS website.

OpenGEM has not been actively developed since 2008 but is feature-complete as a basic GUI and includes a full SDK for future third-party development or extension.

=== Compatibility ===
OpenGEM works with FreeDOS Beta 9 and above, DR DOS 5.0 and above, MS-DOS 3.3 and above, PC DOS 3.3 and above, REAL/32, and DOSBox 0.65. OpenGEM will function on Windows 95, Windows 98, Windows 98SE, and Windows ME. It is not known to work with Windows NT, Windows 2000 and Windows XP or later.

== See also ==
- ViewMAX
- QEMU
- GEM character set
