= Ventura International =

Character encoding for use with Ventura Publisher

Ventura International (or VENTURA_INT) is an 8-bit character encoding created by Ventura Software for use with Ventura Publisher. Ventura International is based on the GEM character set, but ¢ and ø are swapped and ¥ and Ø are swapped so that it is more similar to code page 437 (on which GEM was based, but GEM is more similar to code page 865 because the placement of Ø and ø in GEM match the placement in code page 865). There is also the PCL Ventura International, which is used for communication with PCL printers. PCL Ventura International is based on HP Roman-8. Both have the same character set, but a different encoding.

== Ventura International character set ==
Ventura International
	0	1	2	3	4	5	6	7	8	9	A	B	C	D	E	F
0x																
1x																
2x	SP	!	"	#	$	%	&	’	(	)	*	+	,	-	.	/
3x	0	1	2	3	4	5	6	7	8	9	:	;	<	=	>	?
4x	@	A	B	C	D	E	F	G	H	I	J	K	L	M	N	O
5x	P	Q	R	S	T	U	V	W	X	Y	Z	[	\	]		_
6x	‘	a	b	c	d	e	f	g	h	i	j	k	l	m	n	o
7x	p	q	r	s	t	u	v	w	x	y	z	{	|	}	~	
8x	Ç	ü	é	â	ä	à	å	ç	ê	ë	è	ï	î	ì	Ä	Å
9x	É	æ	Æ	ô	ö	ò	û	ù	ÿ	Ö	Ü	¢	£	¥	¤	ƒ
Ax	á	í	ó	ú	ñ	Ñ	ª	º	¿	“	”	‹	›	¡	«	»
Bx	ã	õ	Ø	ø	œ	Œ	À	Ã	Õ	§	‡	†	¶	©	®	™
Cx	„	…	‰	•	–	—	°	Á	Â	È	Ê	Ë	Ì	Í	Î	Ï
Dx	Ò	Ó	Ô	Š	š	Ù	Ú	Û	Ÿ	ß						
Ex																
Fx																

== PCL Ventura International character set ==
PCL Ventura International
	0	1	2	3	4	5	6	7	8	9	A	B	C	D	E	F
0x																
1x																
2x	SP	!	"	#	$	%	&	’	(	)	*	+	,	-	.	/
3x	0	1	2	3	4	5	6	7	8	9	:	;	<	=	>	?
4x	@	A	B	C	D	E	F	G	H	I	J	K	L	M	N	O
5x	P	Q	R	S	T	U	V	W	X	Y	Z	[	\	]		_
6x	‘	a	b	c	d	e	f	g	h	i	j	k	l	m	n	o
7x	p	q	r	s	t	u	v	w	x	y	z	{	|	}	~	
8x																
9x																
Ax	„	À	Â	È	Ê	Ë	Î	Ï	©	®	™	‹	›	Ù	Û	
Bx	‰	“	”	°	Ç	ç	Ñ	ñ	¡	¿	¤	£	¥	§	ƒ	¢
Cx	â	ê	ô	û	á	é	ó	ú	à	è	ò	ù	ä	ë	ö	ü
Dx	Å	î	Ø	Æ	å	í	ø	æ	Ä	ì	Ö	Ü	É	ï	ß	Ô
Ex	Á	Ã	ã			Í	Ì	Ó	Ò	Õ	õ	Š	š	Ú	Ÿ	ÿ
Fx	Œ	œ	¶	†	‡	—	–			ª	º	«	•	»		…

== Conversion tables ==
Ventura International → PCL Ventura International (upper half only; lower half is identical)
	_0	_1	_2	_3	_4	_5	_6	_7	_8	_9	_A	_B	_C	_D	_E	_F
8_	B4	CF	C5	C0	CC	C8	D4	B5	C1	CD	C9	DD	D1	D9	D8	D0
9_	DC	D7	D3	C2	CE	CA	C3	CB	EF	DA	DB	BF	BB	BC	BA	BE
A_	C4	D5	C6	C7	B7	B6	F9	FA	B9	B1	B2	AB	AC	B8	FB	FD
B_	E2	EA	D2	D6	F1	F0	A1	E1	E9	BD	F4	F3	F2	A8	A9	AA
C_	A0	FF	B0	FC	F6	F5	B3	E0	A2	A3	A4	A5	E6	E5	A6	A7
D_	E8	E7	DF	EB	EC	AD	ED	AE	EE	DE						
E_																
F_																

PCL Ventura International → Ventura International (upper half only; lower half is identical)
	_0	_1	_2	_3	_4	_5	_6	_7	_8	_9	_A	_B	_C	_D	_E	_F
8_																
9_																
A_	C0	B6	C8	C9	CA	CB	CE	CF	BD	BE	BF	AB	AC	D5	D7	
B_	C2	A9	AA	C6	80	87	A5	A4	AD	A8	9E	9C	9D	B9	9F	9B
C_	83	88	93	96	A0	82	A2	A3	85	8A	95	97	84	89	94	81
D_	8F	8C	B2	92	86	A1	B3	91	8E	8D	99	9A	90	8B	D9	D2
E_	C7	B7	B0			CD	CC	D1	D0	B8	B1	D3	D4	D6	D8	98
F_	B5	B4	BC	BB	BA	C5	C4			A6	A7	AE	C3	AF		C1

== See also ==
- Ventura Symbol
