= Ben Fong-Torres =

American rock journalist (born 1945)

- Fong-Torres in 2005
- Born: Fong Chan Ho; January 7, 1945 (age 81); Alameda, California, US
- Education: San Francisco State University
- Occupations: Rock journalist, author, and broadcaster
- Spouse: Dianne Sweet
- Writing career
- Notable awards: Deems Taylor Award for Magazine Writing, 1974; N. Calif. Emmy Awards, 2004, 2007, 2008, 2017, 2019
- Website: www.benfongtorres.com

Ben Fong-Torres

Fong Chan Ho
- Chinese: 方振豪
- Jyutping: Fong^{1} Zan^{3}hou^{4}
- Cantonese Yale: Fōng Janhoùh
- Hanyu Pinyin: Fāng Zhènháo [fáŋ ʈʂə̂nxǎʊ]
Transcriptions
Standard Mandarin
- Hanyu Pinyin: Fāng Zhènháo [fáŋ ʈʂə̂nxǎʊ]
Yue: Cantonese
- Yale Romanization: Fōng Janhoùh
- Jyutping: Fong^{1} Zan^{3}hou^{4}

Benjamin Fong-Torres (方振豪; Cantonese: Fong Chan Ho; born January 7, 1945) is an American rock journalist best known for his association with Rolling Stone magazine (until 1981) and the San Francisco Chronicle (from around 1982).

== Biography ==
Due to the Chinese Exclusion Act, Fong-Torres's father Ricardo (born Fong Kwok Seung), changed his surname to Torres and posed as a Filipino to immigrate to the United States. The family later adopted the hyphenated surname "Fong-Torres". Ben is the brother of the late Shirley Fong-Torres.

He grew up in Oakland, California, where he served as student body president at Westlake Junior High as well as a newspaper reporter/columnist and commissioner of assemblies at Oakland High School.

Fong-Torres, who graduated from San Francisco State University in 1966 with a B.A. in radio-TV-film, was a writer and senior editor of Rolling Stone nearly from the magazine's inception.

In 1972, Ben's older brother, Barry, a probation officer and community worker, was murdered. Barry had been passionate about working with the Chinese community. In the Netflix documentary about Ben's work with Rolling Stone, Ben states that some may wrongly have thought his brother was with law enforcement.

Fong-Torres conducted interviews for Rolling Stone of entertainment figures including Bob Dylan, the Rolling Stones, comedian Steve Martin and Linda Ronstadt's first cover story in 1975. He also profiled Ike & Tina Turner, Marvin Gaye, Sly and the Family Stone, Bonnie Raitt, Paul McCartney and Rodney Dangerfield. A Fong-Torres interview with Ray Charles was awarded the Deems Taylor Award for Magazine Writing in 1974.

Fong-Torres was also a rock DJ for San Francisco radio station KSAN-FM in the 1970s. He later hosted a live, weekly entertainment and talk show, Fog City Radio, on NPR affiliate KQED-FM. On television, he is the five-time Emmy Award-winning co-anchor of the Chinese New Year Parade broadcast on KTVU (Fox) in San Francisco.

Fong-Torres was a contestant on the game show Wheel of Fortune in 1993.

He has published several books, including Hickory Wind, a biography of Gram Parsons; The Rice Room, a memoir; The Hits Just Keep on Coming, a history of Top 40 radio, and two compilations of past articles, Not Fade Away and Becoming Almost Famous (published in May 2006). His book with The Doors (The Doors By The Doors) was published by Hyperion in November 2006, and he published The Grateful Dead Scrapbook (Chronicle Books) in 2009. The Rice Room was reprinted, with additional material and photographs, by the University of California Press in 2011. That year, Fong-Torres published Eagles: Taking It to the Limit (Running Press). In November 2013, Willin': The Story of Little Feat (Da Capo Press), was released. In 2020, Welbeck published an updated version of his Eagles book, and he signed with Audible to narrate his memoirs and his book on Little Feat.

From July 2005 to April 2019, Fong-Torres wrote the bi-weekly column "Radio Waves" in the San Francisco Chronicle's Sunday Datebook. He has been a contributing editor to Parade magazine, and has served as Senior Editor for Qello, an app and site that streams music concerts and documentaries. In 2007 to 2008, he hosted Backstage Sundays on San Francisco's KFRC-FM, and he was a DJ on BossBossRadio.com until 2016, when he became program director and DJ for Moonalice Radio.

He was portrayed in the 2000 film Almost Famous by actor Terry Chen. The fictional version of Fong-Torres is the lead character William Miller's editor at Rolling Stone. He is depicted on a mural on the side of a building at Haight and Clayton Streets in San Francisco.

Fong-Torres was inducted into the SF State Alumni Hall of Fame in 2004 and delivered the commencement address in 2005. Frequently called upon to MC community events, Fong-Torres has also sung at senior facilities, Broadcast Legends luncheons and weddings. As an officiant, he has married some 30 couples. Fong-Torres was also a judge for the 7th annual Independent Music Awards to support independent artists' careers.

In 2010, Suzanne Joe Kai, founder of production company StudioLA.TV, co-founder of the website AsianConnections.com, and a television and film producer, began work on a documentary on Fong-Torres titled Like a Rolling Stone: The Life and Times of Ben Fong-Torres. The film was licensed to Netflix and released for streaming on May 6, 2022, to English-speaking countries.
