= Chinese Americans in San Francisco =

- Chinese dinner in San Francisco in 1865 (from the travels of Albert D. Richardson)

Total population
- 150,000; 21.4% of total pop. (2014)

Regions with significant populations
- Sunset: 40,000+
- Chinatown: 15,000+

As of 2012, 21.4% of the population in San Francisco was of Chinese descent, and there were at least 150,000 Chinese American residents. The Chinese are the largest Asian American subgroup in San Francisco. San Francisco has the highest percentage of residents of Chinese descent of any major U.S. city, and the second largest Chinese American population, after New York City. The San Francisco Area is 7.9% Chinese American, with many residents in Oakland and Santa Clara County. San Francisco's Chinese community has ancestry mainly from Guangdong province, China and Hong Kong, although there is a sizable population of ethnic Chinese with ancestry from other parts of mainland China and Taiwan as well.

== History ==
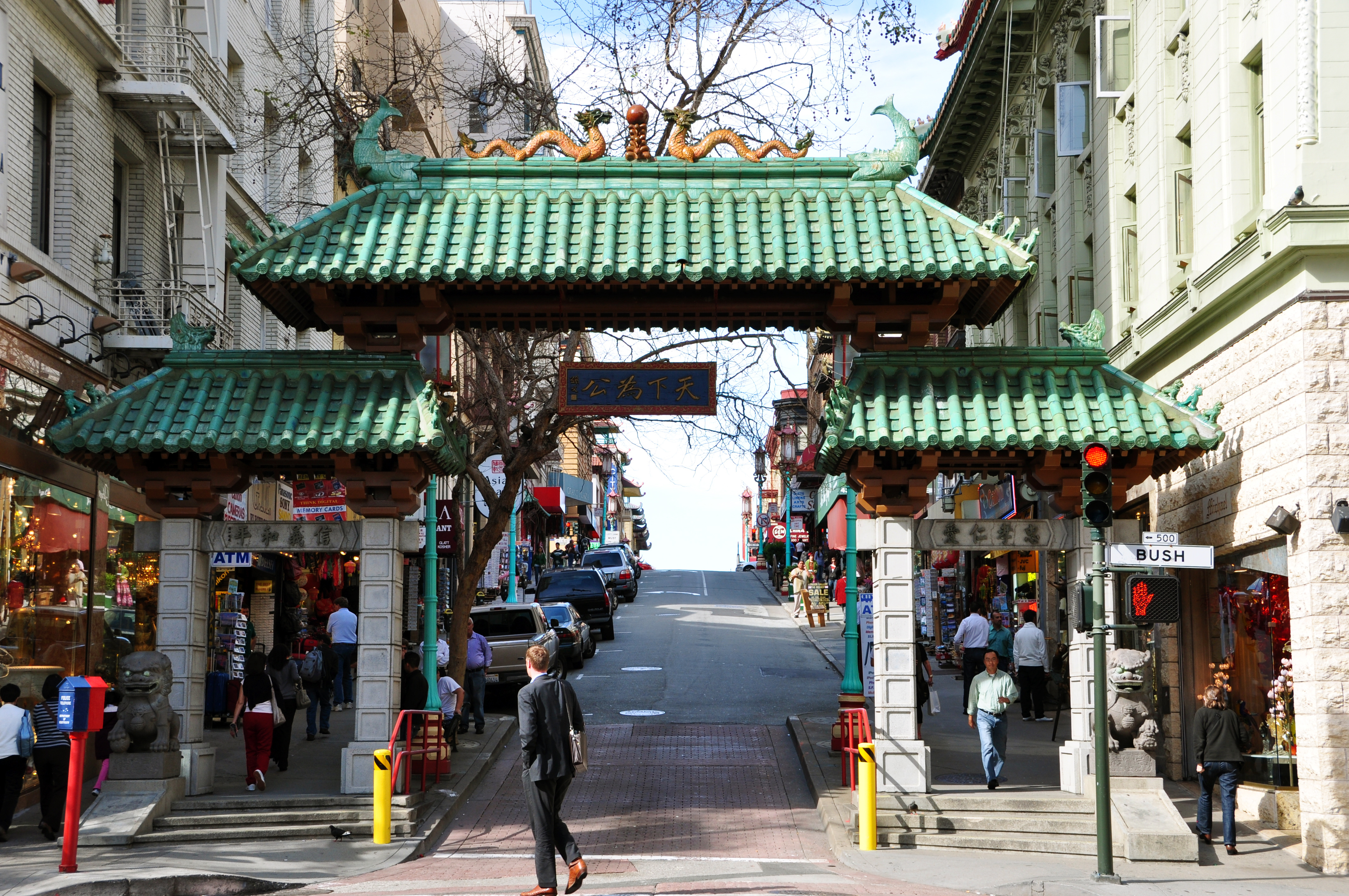
The Gateway Arch (Dragon Gate) on Grant Avenue at Bush Street in Chinatown.

The Chinese arriving in San Francisco, primarily from the Taishan and Zhongshan regions as well as other parts of Guangdong province of Southern China, did so at the height of the California Gold Rush, and many worked in the mines scattered throughout the northern part of the state. Chinatown was the one geographical region deeded by the city government and private property owners, which allowed Chinese people to inherit and inhabit dwellings. The majority of these Chinese shopkeepers, restaurant owners and hired workers in San Francisco's Chinatown were predominantly Hoisanese and male. Many Chinese found jobs working for large companies, most famously as part of the Central Pacific on the Transcontinental Railroad. Other early immigrants worked as mine workers or independent prospectors hoping to strike it rich during the California gold rush.

Though many of the earlier waves of Chinese immigration were predominantly men searching for jobs, Chinese women also began making the journey to the United States. The first known Chinese woman to immigrate was Marie Seise, who arrived in 1848 and worked in the household of Charles V. Gillespie. Within a matter of months of her arrival to the West Coast, the rush for gold in California commenced and brought a flood of prospective miners from around the globe. Among this group were Chinese, primarily from Guangdong Province, most of whom were seafarers with previous Western contacts. "Few women accompanied these early sojourners, many of whom expected to return from after they made their fortune."

The sea voyage to the United States offered new and exciting opportunities, but danger also loomed for women while traveling. Many were discouraged from making the trip due to the harsh living conditions. Oceanic voyages with Chinese immigrants boarded the Pacific Mail Steamship Company and Canadian Pacific Steamship Company. Chinese immigrants had to ride in the steerage where food was stored, and many received rice bowls to eat during the voyage. In 1892, a federal law passed to ensure that immigrants who were on board had a certificate. Due to tight arrangements, unhygienic situations and scarcity in food, this led to health degradation. Many immigrants were unable to board these voyages due to the Geary Act of 1892, which blocked the reunion of immigrants in America with their families not with them. Many diseases found through these voyages were hookworm Yersinia pestis, which contributed greatly to bubonic plague. Once they arrived in San Francisco, their immigration paperwork was processed at an immigration station at the Oriental Warehouse, and after 1910 at the Angel Island Immigration Station.

"During the Gold Rush era, when Chinese men were a common sight in California, Chinese women were an oddity," and were rarely seen in public in urban spaces. Unlike rural areas, Chinatown afforded few opportunities for women to come into contact with the larger society.” Simultaneously, Chinese women also participated in urban sex work, which resulted in laws like one passed in April 1854 to shut down "houses of ill-fame," not racialized in name but practically deployed to "[single] out Mexican and Chinese houses of ill fame, starting with Charles Walden's Golden Rule House on Pacific Street and moving on to establishments run by Ah-Choo, C. Lossen, and Ah Yow."

With national unemployment in the wake of the Panic of 1873, racial tensions in the city boiled over into full-blown race riots, during which Chinese residents and their businesses were targeted by mobs. Growing anti-Chinese sentiment led to the rise of the Workingmen's Party, which gained increased political power in San Francisco by championing anti-Chinese legislation.

Members of the San Francisco Police Chinatown Squad, 1905

During the 1870s and 80s, there was a rise in criminal activity among Chinese gangs known as tongs, raising the incidence of smuggling, gambling and prostitution within the city. By the early 1880s, the population adopted the term "tong war" to describe periods of violence in Chinatown. In response, the San Francisco Police Department set up the Chinatown Squad, a unit for patrolling the city.

In response to the violence, the Consolidated Chinese Benevolent Association, or the Chinese Six Companies, which evolved out of labor recruiting organizations for areas of Guangdong Province, was created to offer a unified voice for the community. The heads of these companies were the leaders of the Chinese merchants, who represented the Chinese community in front of the business community as a whole and the city government. Numerous white citizens defended the Chinese community, among them the Rev. Franklin Rhoda, whose numerous letters appeared in the local press.

Anti-immigrant sentiment became law with the passage of the Chinese Exclusion Act of 1882, the first immigration restriction law aimed at a single ethnic group. After it expired, it was followed up by the Geary Act, which extended the initial exclusion act for another decade and more restrictions. These laws greatly reduced the number of Chinese allowed into the country and the city, and in theory limited Chinese immigration to single men only. Exceptions were granted to the families of wealthy merchants, but the law was effective enough to reduce the population of the neighborhood to an all-time low in the 1920s.

Chinatown suffered massive damage in the 1906 earthquake, though most casualties among Chinese went unrecorded. The earthquake resulted in the loss of birth records and other documentation, allowing many Chinese immigrants to falsely claim American citizenship. Following the earthquake, city leaders made plans to relocate Chinatown and free what they saw as valuable San Francisco real estate. However, staunch opposition from the Chinese government resulted in the idea being abandoned. The city began the rebuilding process a year after the disaster.

From 1910-40, Chinese immigrants arrived in San Francisco through the Angel Island immigration station. Though laws such as the Chinese Exclusion Act heavily restricted Chinese immigration, tens of thousands still entered the city as "paper sons" or "paper daughters". To prevent illegal entry, potential immigrants were often subjected to prolonged interrogation on Angel Island, with some detained for months. The Exclusion Act was repealed during World War II under the Chinese Exclusion Repeal Act in recognition of China's important role as an ally in the war, though tight quotas remained.

The Chinatown Squad was finally disbanded in August 1955 by police chief George Healey at the request of the influential daily Chinese World, which called the unit an "affront to Americans of Chinese descent".

In the 1960s, many working-class Hong Kong Chinese immigrants began arriving in Chinatown in large numbers, and despite their status and professions in Hong Kong, they had to find low-paying employment at restaurants and garment factories in Chinatown because of limited English fluency. More Cantonese-speaking immigrants from Hong Kong and Guangdong gradually led to the replacement of the Taishanese (Hoisanese) dialect with the standard Cantonese dialect.

The Golden Dragon massacre occurred in 1977.

In the Sunset District in western San Francisco, a demographic shift began in the late 1960s and accelerated from the 1980s as Asian immigration to San Francisco surged. Much of the original and largely Irish American population of Sunset moved to other neighborhoods and outlying suburban areas, though a significant Irish American and Irish minority remain in the neighborhood. Informal Chinatowns emerged on Irving Street between 19th and 26th avenues as well as on the commercial sections of Taraval Street and Noriega Street west of 19th Ave. About half of Sunset's residents are Asian American, mostly of Chinese birth and descent. The immigrants in Sunset were both Mandarin- and Cantonese-speaking.

With the rise of the tech industry in Silicon Valley, many immigrants from Mainland China and Taiwan moved to the San Francisco Area. Many of them (particularly the Mandarin-speaking group) reside in the South Area cities of Cupertino, Sunnyvale, Santa Clara, Palo Alto, San Jose and Fremont.

== Geography ==
Chinatowns in San Francisco:

- Chinatown, San Francisco
- Clement Street Chinatown, San Francisco, the "Second Chinatown"
- Irving Street Chinatown, San Francisco, the "Third Chinatown"
- Noriega Street Chinatown, San Francisco, the "Fourth Chinatown"

Chinatowns around San Francisco:

- Chinatown, Oakland
- Chinatown, San Jose, California
- Milpitas Square, a Chinese shopping center in Milpitas, California

== Cultural institutions ==
The Chinese Culture Center, a community-based, non-profit organization, is located between Chinatown and the Financial District in San Francisco.

The Chinese Historical Society of America, since 1963, is a non-profit, and the first organization established in the US to preserve, promote and present the history, heritage, culture and legacy of Chinese in America through exhibitions, education, and research; the Museum is located in San Francisco's original Chinatown on Clay Street.

== Healthcare ==
=== Prior to health care ===
According to "Handbook of Asian American Health" by Grace J. Yoo, the late 19th century was a period of major epidemics in San Francisco, which included outbreaks such as the bubonic plague, smallpox, and cholera. These diseases were commonly found among the poor and working classes. At the time, many believed in the miasma theory, or the spreading of disease due to "breathing sick air", rather than the now widely accepted germ theory. "In 1876, the Chinese were blamed as the source of the disease because of the unsanitary conditions of Chinatown." The area was unsanitary and overpopulated because the city's Chinese population was discriminated against, as Americans saw them as competition for work. This sentiment withheld services, such as access to healthcare or physicians, and property rights from the Chinese, causing them to cluster within Chinatown.

=== Struggles to establish health care ===
Before the Chinese had any particular health care system for their community, all of them had to go through the following barriers: they had to walk a very long distance to receive any medical attention at a hospital, and they were denied coverage due to unaffordable rates of the services provided by the hospitals. Instead most Chinese relied on "folk healer" than on western medicine. The "Folk Healers" were those that provided Chinese traditional medicine to the Chinese community in San Francisco Chinatown. Therefore, many Chinese did not bother to go to the hospital unless it was a crisis.

=== First medical facility: Tung Wah Dispensary ===
The first medical care place in San Francisco Chinatown was the Tung Wah Dispensary( Traditional Chinese: 東華藥房 ）. It was provided by the Chinese Six Companies, and it was built in 1900 on 828 Sacramento Street. The dispensary was named after the Tung Wah Group of Hospitals in Hong Kong, and it housed 25 beds, provided both western and Chinese medicine, free or to low cost care to patients, and its staff was volunteers from the community and physicians from outside of the community. Of those physicians three were American physicians and the rest were Chinese American physicians who helped with the Chinese medicine and translating from Chinese to English for the American physicians.

=== Natural disaster led to the first modern hospital ===
In 1906, due to the great earthquake in San Francisco, the Tung Wah Dispensary was destroyed but was rebuilt in Trenton Alley. However, with the many injuries due to the natural disaster, a lot more Chinese patients needed medical attention, and the dispensary was beginning to overflow with patients. Therefore, they decided to expand the dispensary to a modern hospital. In order to build the modern hospital they needed to make $200,000, so they began to have Chinese pageants that helped to contribute the donations from the Chinese Americans and Americans. So, when they got they collected the $200,000, they finally got permission from the San Francisco Board of Supervisors to build the Hospital, and in two years the construction was in underway. By April 18, 1925 the San Francisco Chinese Hospital (東華醫院) in the San Francisco Chinatown was established. It is the only Chinese-language hospital in the United States. The Asian Aids Project (AAP) was started in the 1987, it is made to help them fight the AIDS epidemic in the Asian Community including the Chinese Americans.

== Education ==
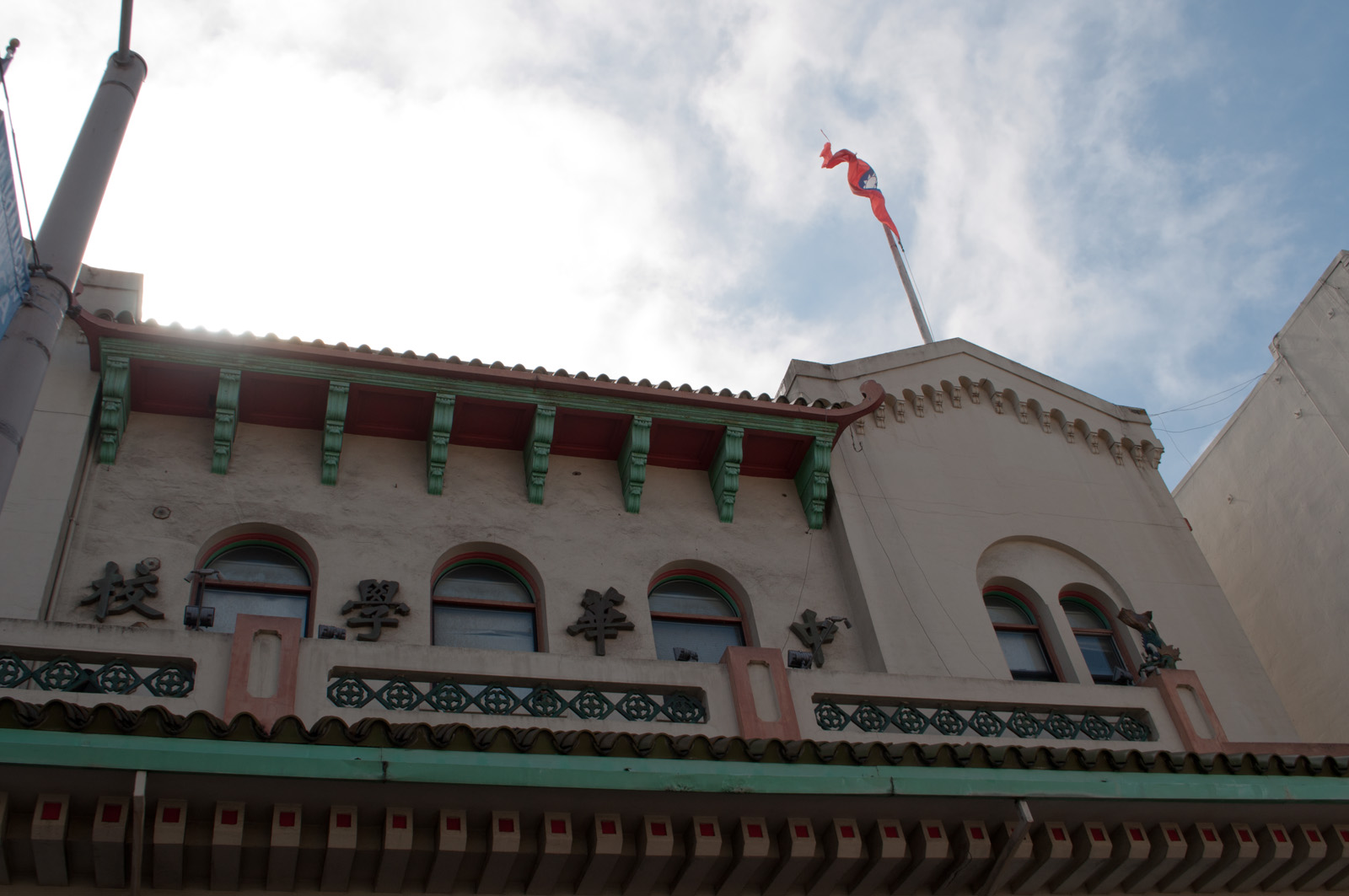
Chinese School, San Francisco (中華學校)

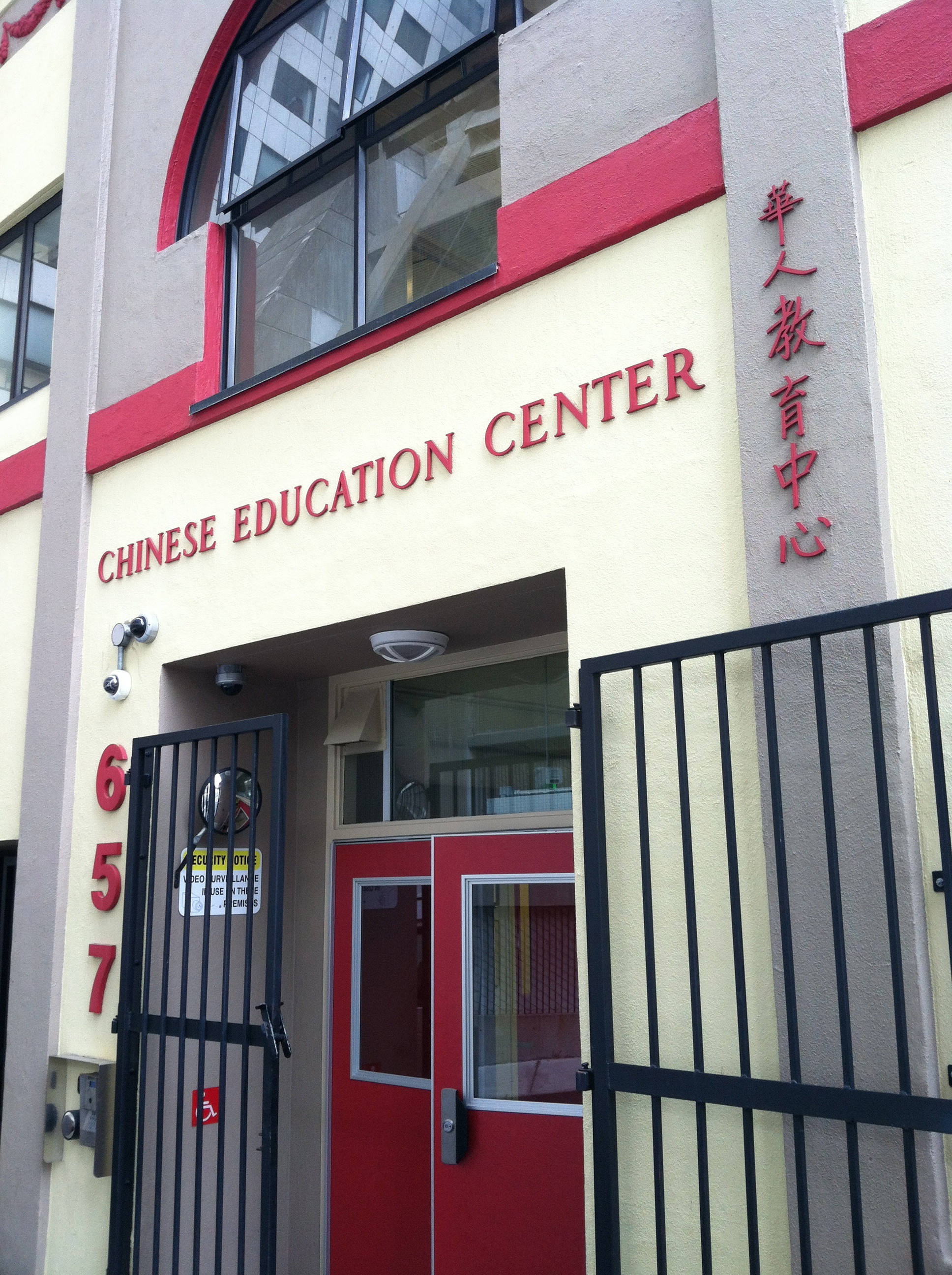
Chinese Education Center Elementary School (舊金山的華人教育中心小學)

In San Francisco:

- The Chinese American International School, Cumberland Chinese School, North Valley Chinese School, Mei Jia Chinese Learning Center, and Alice Fong Yu Alternative School are located in San Francisco.

Around San Francisco:

- Palo Alto Chinese School is located in Palo Alto, and has classes teaching both Mandarin and Cantonese. The Shoong Family Chinese Cultural Center in Oakland serves as the premier Chinese-language school in the East Area, and Contra Costa Chinese School is located in Pleasant Hill.
- The North Valley Chinese School in Milpitas and San Jose Chinese school both serve the greater San Jose area.
- The Redwood Empire Chinese Center's Chinese school in Santa Rosa serves the North Bay.

== Media ==
The New York-based but worldwide-distributed newspaper Epoch Times (大紀元時報) has a branch office in San Francisco. The Hong Kong-based newspaper Sing Tao Daily (星島日報) has an office in San Francisco. East West, The Chinese American Journal folded in 1989. The Chinese-American newspaper World Journal (世界日報) has an office in Millbrae.

KTSF serves as a Chinese-language television broadcast station.

== Transportation ==
Previously the Taiwanese airline China Airlines operated a bus to San Francisco International Airport from Milpitas and Cupertino in California.

== Cultural events ==
The Chinese New Year Parade in San Francisco is held on every Chinese New Year's, and is celebrated in Chinatown. It is the largest Chinese New Year event in North America. The Taiwanese American Cultural Festival, started in 1993, is held in Union Square, San Francisco every May.

== Notable people ==
- Francis Chan, preacher
- Raymond Chow Kwok Cheung, criminal
- Carmen Chu, politician
- Sandra Lee Fewer, politician
- Edsel Ford Fong, waiter at Sam Wo
- Heather Fong, former Chief of San Francisco Police Department
- Alex Gong, kickboxer
- Ed Jew, politician
- Fred Lau, former Chief of San Francisco Police Department
- Bruce Lee, actor, born in Chinatown
- Ed Lee, former Mayor of San Francisco
- Alysa Liu, figure skater and gold medalist at the 2026 Winter Olympics, raised in Oakland
- Walter U. Lum, activist
- Eric Mar, politician
- Gordon Mar, politician
- Betty Ong, American Airlines Flight 11 flight attendant
- Rose Pak, community organizer
- Amy Tan, author
- Katy Tang, politician
- Phil Ting, politician
- Alex Tse, screenwriter
- Ali Wong, comedian
- Martin Wong, artist
- Willie "Woo Woo" Wong, basketball player, who a playground in Chinatown is named after
- Leland Yee, politician
- Norman Yee, politician

== See also ==
- History of Chinese Americans in Los Angeles
