= GEM character set =

Character set of Digital Research's graphical user interface GEM

- Language: English
- Created by: Digital Research
- Based on: code page 437
- Other related encodings: Atari ST character set, Ventura International character set

The GEM character set is the character set of Digital Research's graphical user interface GEM on Intel platforms. It is based on code page 437, the original character set of the IBM PC.

Like codepage 437, it aligns with ASCII codepoints 32–126, and has additional codepoints including letters with diacritics and other symbols. It differs from code page 437 in using other dingbats at code points 0–31, in exchanging the box-drawing characters 176–223 for international characters and other symbols, and exchanging code point 236 with the symbol for line integral. However, GEM is more similar to code page 865, because the codepoints of Ø and ø match the codepoints in that codepage.

A slight adaptation for Ventura Publisher is the similar Ventura International character set, it has code points 0-31, 127, and 218-255 empty, and has swapped ¢ and ø and has also swapped ¥ and Ø (to match code page 437 more).

The GEM-derived file manager ViewMAX, which shipped with some versions of DR DOS as a DOSSHELL replacement, does not use the GEM character set, but loads its display fonts from DOS .CPI files depending on the system's current code page.

== Character set ==
The following table shows the GEM character set. Each character is shown with a potential Unicode equivalent, although some codes do not have a unique Unicode equivalent; the correct choice may depend upon context.

GEM character set
	0	1	2	3	4	5	6	7	8	9	A	B	C	D	E	F
0x	NUL	⇧ (Note: 1–8 and 18-19 are used in GEM AES user interface elements such as icons for closing, resizing and maximizing windows.)	⇩	⇨	⇦	◼	🗗	◆	✓	🕒︎	🔔︎	♪	▴	▾	▸	◂
1x	►	◄	⧓	▂	¶ (Note: Code point 20 (14_{16}) is an unfilled paragraph sign, while code point 188 (BC_{16}) is a filled paragraph sign. This distinction does not exist in Unicode, so both are mapped to U+00B6 PILCROW SIGN here.)	§	↕	↨	↑	↓	→	←	∟	↔	▲	▼
2x	SP	!	"	#	$	%	&	'	(	)	*	+	,	-	.	/
3x	0	1	2	3	4	5	6	7	8	9	:	;	<	=	>	?
4x	@	A	B	C	D	E	F	G	H	I	J	K	L	M	N	O
5x	P	Q	R	S	T	U	V	W	X	Y	Z	[	\	]		_
6x	`	a	b	c	d	e	f	g	h	i	j	k	l	m	n	o
7x	p	q	r	s	t	u	v	w	x	y	z	{	|	}	~	⌂
8x	Ç	ü	é	â	ä	à	å	ç	ê	ë	è	ï	î	ì	Ä	Å
9x	É	æ	Æ	ô	ö	ò	û	ù	ÿ	Ö	Ü	ø	£	Ø	¤	ƒ
Ax	á	í	ó	ú	ñ	Ñ	ª	º	¿	“	”	‹	›	¡	«	»
Bx	ã	õ	¥	¢	œ	Œ	À	Ã	Õ	§	‡	†	¶	©	®	™
Cx	„	…	‰	•	–	—	°	Á	Â	È	Ê	Ë	Ì	Í	Î	Ï
Dx	Ò	Ó	Ô	Š	š	Ù	Ú	Û	Ÿ	ß						
Ex	α	β	Γ	π	Σ	σ	µ (Note: 230 (E6_{hex}) is both the micro sign (U+00B5, µ) and the Greek lowercase mu (U+03BC, μ).)	τ	Φ	Θ	Ω (Note: 234 (EA_{hex}) is both the ohm sign (U+2126, Ω) and the Greek uppercase omega (U+03A9, Ω). (Unicode considers the ohm sign to be equivalent to uppercase omega, and suggests that the latter be used in both contexts.))	δ (Note: 235 (EB_{hex}) is the Greek lowercase delta (U+03B4, δ), but it has also been used as a surrogate for the Icelandic lowercase eth (U+00F0, ð) and the partial derivative sign (U+2202, ∂).)	∮	ɸ	∈	∩
Fx	≡	±	≥	≤	⌠	⌡	÷	≈	°	∙	·	√	ⁿ	²	■	∅

Different than code page 437

== See also ==
- Atari ST character set
- Western Latin character sets (computing)
- Alt codes
- Bitstream International Character Set
- Ventura International Character Set
