= ViewMAX =

File manager

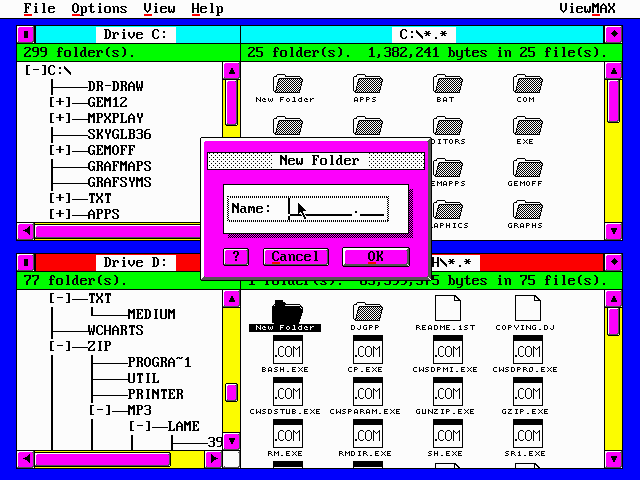
- Screenshot of ViewMAX 2 file manager with user-defined colors
- Developers: Digital Research, Novell, Caldera Thin Clients
- Release: 1990; 36 years ago
- Stable release: ViewMAX 3 beta / April 1999; 27 years ago
- Operating system: DR-DOS
- Type: Windowing system
- License: GNU General Public License

ViewMAX is a CUA-compliant file manager supplied with DR DOS versions 5.0 and 6.0. It is based on a cut-down runtime version of Digital Research's GEM/3 graphical user interface modified to run only a single statically built application, the ViewMAX desktop. Support for some unneeded functions has been removed whilst some new functions were added at the same time. Nevertheless, the systems remained close enough for ViewMAX to recognize GEM desktop accessories (.ACC executables) automatically and to allow some native GEM applications (.APP executables) to be run inside the ViewMAX environment (without having to install and launch GEM first). Many display drivers for GEM 3.xx could be used by ViewMAX as well, enabling ViewMAX to be used with non-standard display adapters and higher resolutions than possible using the default set of ViewMAX drivers. Also, Digital Research's SID86, the symbolic instruction debugger that shipped with DR DOS 3.xx and provided dedicated functions to debug GEM applications (see ?Y GEM-specific help under SID86 or GEMSID), could be used for ViewMAX as well.

== Versions ==
Originally named Navigator in beta versions, ViewMAX 1.00 was distributed with DR DOS 5.0 in 1990 to provide an equivalent to DOSSHELL in MS-DOS/PC DOS 4.0. It had a very similar appearance to Digital Research's previous GEM desktops – two fixed-size windows. Each window would either contain icons representing drives, directories and files, or a representation of the directory hierarchy. If supported by the underlying operating system (such as DR DOS), file and directory passwords and access permissions were supported. Network drives (including CD-ROM drives) were distinguished through their own icon, different from those of local drives.

In 1991, ViewMAX 2 was distributed with DR DOS 6.0. Various graphical improvements were made in this release, including controls with a 3D appearance and user-selectable colour schemes. The directory tree (if enabled) was now shown beside the list of icons, rather than instead of it. Various settings could be stored in a configuration files named %DRDOSCFG%\VIEWMAX.INI. For more flexible character set support ViewMAX 2 loaded display fonts from a standard DOS .CPI file depending on the current code page rather than using a GEM specific character set, a feature also incorporated into FreeGEM since 2005. The DOS/V-compatible Japanese version of ViewMAX, as distributed with DR DOS 6.0/V in 1992, supported DBCS characters loaded by $FONT.SYS from SCREENHZ.FNT. Support was added for the DR DOS task switcher TaskMAX; if this was present, applications would be launched as separate tasks, and ViewMAX could switch between them. As TASKMGR in later operating systems such as Novell DOS 7, OpenDOS 7.01, DR-DOS 7.02 and higher continued to emulate most of the task switcher API as well, ViewMAX 2 could be used to switch and control multiple concurrently running full-screen DOS tasks under the DR-DOS preemptively multitasking kernel (EMM386 /MULTI + TASKMGR) as well.

ViewMAX 3 was intended to be the graphical file manager for Novell's next version of DR DOS. ViewMAX 3 included support for colour icons, movable and resizable windows, program groups, and background images. If the underlying DR-DOS had the optional multi-user security module loaded, ViewMAX would also provide support for the extended world/group/owner access permission system. Although ViewMAX 3 was part of the DR DOS "Panther" Beta 1 distribution in October 1992, it was never completed and apparently abandoned in favour to Apple's and Novell's "Star Trek" team project in 1992/1993, which remained unreleased as well. So, Novell DOS 7, as "DR DOS 7.0" was called in 1994, came without any graphical file manager at all. When Caldera bought the remaining Digital Research assets from Novell on 23 July 1996, initial plans were to revive GEM and ViewMAX technologies for a low-footprint user interface for OpenDOS in mobile applications as Caldera View, but these plans were abandoned by Caldera UK in favour of DR-WebSpyder and GROW. After closing the DR-DOS development center Caldera UK in early 1999, the remaining source code of the ViewMAX 3 beta version was published in April 1999 by the US parent company Caldera Thin Clients under the GPL following continued community request to release the sources, shortly before the company changed its name to Lineo and switched to Linux-based technologies three months later. Various ViewMAX features not previously found in GEM have been incorporated into FreeGEM since then.

== See also ==
- GEM
- DOSSHELL
- Comparison of file managers
- COMMAND.COM
