= Ellipsis =

Triple-dot punctuation mark

…o

Ellipsis
- U+2026 … HORIZONTAL ELLIPSIS (&hellip;, &mldr;)
...	. . .	⋯	⋮
AP format	Chicago format	Mid-line ellipsis	Vertical ellipsis

The ellipsis (/ə.ˈlɪp.sɪs/, plural ellipses), rendered ..., also known as suspension points, dots, periods of ellipsis, or ellipsis points, or, colloquially, dot, dot, dot is a punctuation mark consisting of a series of three dots. An ellipsis can be used in many ways, such as for intentional omission of text or numbers, to imply a concept without using words, or to mark a pause in speech. Style guides differ on how to render an ellipsis both digitally and in print. In some cases, an ellipsis may have two, four or more dots, spaced dots, or some incorporation with other punctuation.

The name of the mark ultimately comes from Ancient Greek: ἔλλειψις, élleipsis, lit. 'leave out'.

== Style ==
Opinions differ on how to render an ellipsis in printed material and are to some extent based on the technology used for rendering. According to The Chicago Manual of Style, it should consist of three periods, each separated from its neighbor by a non-breaking space: . . .. According to the AP Stylebook, the periods should be rendered with no space between them: .... A third option – available in electronic text – is to use the precomposed character U+2026 … HORIZONTAL ELLIPSIS.

When text is omitted following a sentence, a period (full stop) terminates the sentence, and a subsequent ellipsis indicates one or more omitted sentences before continuing a longer quotation. Business Insider magazine suggests this style and it is also used in many academic journals. The Associated Press Stylebook favors this approach.

When a sentence ends with ellipsis, some style guides indicate there should be four dots; three for ellipsis and a period. Chicago advises it, as does the Publication Manual of the American Psychological Association (APA style), while some other style guides do not; the Merriam-Webster Dictionary and related works treat this style as optional, saying that it "may" be used.

== History ==
In her book on ellipsis, (Note: Toner uses "ellipsis" as a general term, encompassing such marks as . . . ("ellipsis points"), —, and * * * when used in the appropriate function (omitting words). While unusual in the contemporary era, the same nomenclature can be found, for example, in the 1886 Webster's Dictionary.) Ellipsis in English Literature: Signs of Omission, Anne Toner's earliest example of the mark . . . in English is from 1710, in a printing of the play Love for Love, where the convention had probably been borrowed from continental Europe:

This text was published by Thomas Johnson [...]. Although the 1710 Love for Love has a London imprint, Johnson printed his work from The Hague. [...] [L]ikely perhaps is that Johnson’s dots reflect the continental tradition of punctuating ellipses with points rather than dashes. Whatever the case, these plays reveal that an English audience was encountering series of dots as a variant notation of ellipsis in works written in English. They were also encountering dot, dot, dot in works published abroad.

For example, the mark . . . was already in use in France by the 1630s (bracketed translation in the original):

Points de suspension . . . rather than a dash or series of hyphens became the conventional mark of omission in French texts. These seem to become a standard feature of the dramatic text rather later than their equivalents in England, but they are certainly well established by the 1630s. Furetière in his dictionary of 1690 described how: ‘Quand on met plusieurs points après un mot, c’est signe que le sens est imparfait, qu’il y a quelque lacune, ou quelque chose à ajouter.’ [‘When one puts a series of points after a word, it’s a sign that the sense is imperfect, that there’s a gap, or something to add.’] In Anne Dacier’s 1688 edition of Terence both the French translation and the Latin text are marked with suspension points

According to Toner, "[t]he dash and ellipsis points . . . were originally equivalent versions of the same mark." "It [took] . . . centuries to accrue those meanings that separated it from a series of hyphens or a series of stars." "While we distinguish today between the trailing away of these ellipsis points . . . and the more abrupt interruption signalled by a dash, such specific tonal and durational cues have emerged slowly" Several examples can be found in Ellipsis in English Literature of early printed texts being set with . . . where a dash was before, with no apparent intended change in meaning. In later works, the two symbols have acquired their own particular characteristic meanings.

"Subpuncting" of medieval manuscripts also denotes omitted meaning and may be related:

In medieval manuscripts, we find a mark—sometimes called subpuncting or underdotting—that is used to indicate the omission of a word or phrase, usually when that word or phrase has been copied erroneously. This omission mark involves placing a series of dots under the word that is to be omitted. [...] Wakelin notes that subpuncting begins to die out in the early 16th century, and Toner picks up on the rise of the ellipsis in the late 16th century.

The ellipsis has been championed by writers such as Percy Bysshe Shelley, Jane Austen and Virginia Woolf.

According to Toner, it is difficult to establish when the "dot, dot, dot" phrase (meaning "etcetera") was first used. There is an early instance, which is perhaps the first in a piece of fiction, in Virginia Woolf's short story "An Unwritten Novel" (1920).

== In writing ==
Occasionally, it would be used in pulp fiction and other works of early 20th-century fiction to denote expletives that would otherwise have been censored.

An ellipsis may also imply an unstated alternative indicated by context. For example, "I never drink wine..." implies that the speaker does drink something else—such as vodka.

In reported speech, the ellipsis can be used to represent an intentional silence.

In poetry, an ellipsis is used as a thought-pause or line break at the caesura or this is used to highlight sarcasm or make the reader think about the last points in the poem.

In news reporting, often put inside square brackets, it is used to indicate that a quotation has been condensed for space, brevity or relevance, as in "The President said that [...] he would not be satisfied", where the exact quotation was "The President said that, for as long as this situation continued, he would not be satisfied".

Herb Caen, Pulitzer-prize-winning columnist for the San Francisco Chronicle, became famous for his "three-dot journalism".

Depending on context, ellipsis can indicate an unfinished thought, a leading statement, a slight pause, an echoing voice, or a nervous or awkward silence. Aposiopesis is the use of an ellipsis to trail off into silence—for example: "But I thought he was..." When placed at the end of a sentence, an ellipsis may be used to suggest melancholy or longing.

In newspaper and magazine columns, ellipses may separate items of a list instead of paragraph breaks.

Merriam-Webster's Manual for Writers and Editors uses a line of ellipsis to indicate omission of whole lines in a quoted poem.

== In different languages ==
=== In English ===
==== American English ====
The Chicago Manual of Style suggests the use of an ellipsis for any omitted word, phrase, line, or paragraph from within but not at the end of a quoted passage. There are two commonly used methods of using ellipses: one uses three dots for any omission, while the second one makes a distinction between omissions within a sentence (using three dots: . . .) and omissions between sentences (using a period and a space followed by three dots: . ...). The Chicago Style Q&A recommends that writers avoid using the precomposed character U+2026 … HORIZONTAL ELLIPSIS in manuscripts and to place three periods plus two non-breaking spaces (. . .) instead, leaving the editor, publisher, or typographer to replace them later.

The Modern Language Association (MLA) used to indicate that an ellipsis must include spaces before and after each dot in all uses. If an ellipsis is meant to represent an omission, square brackets must surround the ellipsis to make it clear that there was no pause in the original quote: [ . . . ]. Currently, the MLA has removed the requirement of brackets in its style handbooks. However, some maintain that the use of brackets is still correct because it clears confusion.

The MLA now indicates that a three-dot, spaced ellipsis . . . should be used for removing material from within one sentence within a quote. When crossing sentences (when the omitted text contains a period, so that omitting the end of a sentence counts), a four-dot, spaced (except for before the first dot) ellipsis . . . . should be used. When ellipsis points are used in the original text, ellipsis points that are not in the original text should be distinguished by enclosing them in square brackets (e.g. text [...] text).

According to the Associated Press, the ellipsis should be used to condense quotations. It is less commonly used to indicate a pause in speech or an unfinished thought or to separate items in material such as show business gossip. The stylebook indicates that if the shortened sentence before the mark can stand as a sentence, it should do so, with an ellipsis placed after the period or other ending punctuation. When material is omitted at the end of a paragraph and also immediately following it, an ellipsis goes both at the end of that paragraph and at the beginning of the next, according to this style.

According to Robert Bringhurst's Elements of Typographic Style, the details of typesetting ellipses depend on the character and size of the font being set and the typographer's preference. Bringhurst writes that a full space between each pair of dots is "another Victorian eccentricity. In most contexts, the Chicago ellipsis is much too wide"—he recommends using flush dots (with a normal word space before and after), or thin-spaced dots (up to one-fifth of an em), or the prefabricated ellipsis character U+2026 … HORIZONTAL ELLIPSIS (&hellip;, &mldr;). Bringhurst suggests that normally an ellipsis should be spaced fore-and-aft to separate it from the text, but when it combines with other punctuation, the leading space disappears and the other punctuation follows. This is the usual practice in typesetting. He provides the following examples:

i ... jk....l..., ll, ... lm...?n...!

In legal writing in the United States, Rule 5.3 in the Bluebook citation guide governs the use of ellipses and requires that the dots be separated by (non-breaking) spaces. If an ellipsis ends the sentence, then there are three dots followed by the final punctuation, all space-separated, e.g. Hah . . . ? and Hah . . . .. This is clearly distinct from an ellipsis following a sentence, e.g. Really? . . . and Really. . . .. In some legal writing, an ellipsis is written as three asterisks, *** or * * *, to make it obvious that text has been omitted or to signal that the omitted text extends beyond the end of the paragraph.

==== British English ====
The Oxford Style Guide recommends setting the ellipsis as a single character … or as a series of three (narrow) spaced dots surrounded by spaces, thus: . . . . If there is an ellipsis at the end of an incomplete sentence, the final full stop is omitted. However, it is retained if the following ellipsis represents an omission between two complete sentences.

The ... fox jumps ...
The quick brown fox jumps over the lazy dog. ... And if they have not died, they are still alive today.
It is not cold ... it is freezing cold.

Contrary to (Oxford University Press's) The Oxford Style Guide, the University of Oxford Style Guide demands that an ellipsis not be surrounded by spaces, except when it stands for a pause; then, a space has to be set after the ellipsis (but not before), and it states that an ellipsis should never be preceded or followed by a full stop.

The...fox jumps...
The quick brown fox jumps over the lazy dog...And if they have not died, they are still alive today.
It is not cold... it is freezing cold.

=== In Polish ===
When applied in Polish syntax, the ellipsis is called wielokropek, literally "multidot". The word wielokropek distinguishes the ellipsis of Polish syntax from that of mathematical notation, in which it is known as an elipsa. When an ellipsis replaces a fragment omitted from a quotation, the ellipsis is enclosed in parentheses or square brackets. An unbracketed ellipsis indicates an interruption or pause in speech. The syntactic rules for ellipses are standardized by the 1983 Polska Norma document PN-83/P-55366, Zasady składania tekstów w języku polskim (Rules for Setting Texts in Polish).

=== In Russian ===
The combination "ellipsis+period" is replaced by the ellipsis. The combinations "ellipsis+exclamation mark" and "ellipsis+question mark" are written in this way: "!.. ?.."

=== In Japanese ===
The most common character corresponding to an ellipsis is called san-ten rīdā ("3-dot leaders", …). Ni-ten rīdā with two dots exists as a character, but it is used less commonly. In writing, the ellipsis consists usually of six dots (two san-ten rīdā characters, ……). Three dots (one san-ten rīdā character) may be used where space is limited, such as in a header. However, variations in the number of dots exist. In horizontally written text the dots are commonly vertically centered within the text height (between the baseline and the ascent line), as in the standard Japanese Windows fonts; in vertically written text the dots are always centered horizontally. As the Japanese word for dot is pronounced "ten", the dots are colloquially called "ten-ten-ten" (てんてんてん, akin to the English "dot dot dot").

In text in Japanese media, such as in manga or video games, ellipses are much more frequent than in English, and are often changed to another punctuation sign in translation. The ellipsis by itself represents speechlessness, or a "pregnant pause". Depending on the context, this could be anything from an admission of guilt to an expression of being dumbfounded at another person's words or actions. As a device, the ten-ten-ten is intended to focus the reader on a character while allowing the character to not speak any dialogue. This conveys to the reader a focus of the narrative "camera" on the silent subject, implying an expectation of some motion or action. It is not unheard of to see inanimate objects "speaking" the ellipsis.

=== In Chinese ===
In Chinese, the ellipsis is six dots (in two groups of three dots, occupying the same horizontal or vertical space as two characters). In horizontally written text the dots are commonly vertically centered along the midline (halfway between the Roman descent and Roman ascent, or equivalently halfway between the Roman baseline and the capital height, i.e. ⋯⋯). This is generally true of Traditional Chinese, while Simplified Chinese tends to have the ellipses aligned with the baseline; in vertically written text the dots are always centered horizontally (i.e. Chinese: ︙︙). Taiwan and China have different punctuation standards.

=== In Spanish ===
In Spanish, the ellipsis is commonly used as a substitute of et cetera at the end of unfinished lists. So it means "and so forth" or "and other things".

Other use is the suspension of a part of a text, or a paragraph, or a phrase or a part of a word because it is obvious, or unnecessary, or implied. For instance, sometimes the ellipsis is used to avoid the complete use of expletives.

When the ellipsis is placed alone into brackets [...] or—less often—between parentheses (...), which is what happens usually within a text transcription, it means the original text had more contents on the same position but are not useful to our target in the transcription. When the suppressed text is at the beginning or at the end of a text, the ellipsis does not need to be placed into brackets.

The number of dots is three and only three. They should have no space in between them nor with the preceding word, but there should be a space with the following word (except if they are followed by a punctuation sign, such as a comma).

=== In French ===
In French, the ellipsis is commonly used at the end of lists to represent et cetera. In French typography, the ellipsis is written immediately after the preceding word, but has a space after it, for example: comme ça... pas comme ceci. If, exceptionally, it begins a sentence, there is a space before and after, for example: Lui ? ... vaut rien, je crois.... However, any omitted word, phrase or line in the middle or at the end of an incompletely quoted passage would be indicated as follows: [...] (space before and after the square brackets but not inside), for example: ... à Paris, Nice, [...] Nantes et Toulouse.

=== In German ===
In German, the ellipsis in general is surrounded by spaces, if it stands for one or more omitted words. On the other side there is no space between a letter or (part of) a word and an ellipsis, if it stands for one or more omitted letters, that should stick to the written letter or letters.

Example for both cases, using German style: The first el...is stands for omitted letters, the second ... for an omitted word.

If the ellipsis is at the end of a sentence, the final full stop is omitted.

Example: I think that ...

=== In Italian ===
The Accademia della Crusca suggests the use of an ellipsis ("puntini di sospensione") to indicate a pause longer than a period and, when placed between brackets, the omission of letters, words or phrases.

"Tra le cose più preziose possedute da Andrea Sperelli era una coperta di seta fina, d'un colore azzurro disfatto, intorno a cui giravano i dodici segni dello Zodiaco in ricamo, con le denominazioni […] a caratteri gotici." (Gabriele D'Annunzio, Il piacere)

== Two-dot ellipsis ==
Rarely, an ellipsis of two dots, or "two-dot ellipsis", may be used. Some examples are some Sears catalogs, the poems of Robert Browning and Elizabeth Barrett Browning ("to indicate a slight pause"), and the poetry of John Berryman.

Two dots in a row, resembling a two-dot ellipsis — if not in fact a two-dot ellipsis — may be a typo for a three-dot ellipsis, a typo for a one-dot period, or a legitimate case of two periods occurring in a row (for instance, in an acronym terminated by a period that occurs at the end of a sentence, if written in a style that causes two periods to be written in such a situation).

Unicode has a similar character, U+2025 ‥ TWO DOT LEADER. It is intended for use as a leader and is closely related to U+2024 ․ ONE DOT LEADER and U+2026 … HORIZONTAL ELLIPSIS (which is encoded for use also as a three dot leader).

In some programming languages, .. is used, such as to create a range.

== In mathematical notation ==
An ellipsis is used in mathematics to mean "and so forth", usually indicating the omission of terms that follow an obvious pattern as indicated by included terms.

The whole numbers from 1 to 100 can be shown as:

$$1,2,3,\ldots,100$$

The positive whole numbers, an infinite list, can be shown as:

$$1,2,3,\ldots$$

To indicate omitted terms in a repeated operation, an ellipsis is sometimes raised from the baseline, as:

$$1+2+3+\cdots+100$$

But, this raised formatting is not standard. For example, Russian mathematical texts use the baseline format.

The ellipsis is not a formally defined mathematical symbol. Repeated summations or products may be more formally denoted using capital sigma and capital pi notation, respectively:

$1+2+3+\cdots+100\ = \sum_{n=1}^{100} n = 100?$ (see termial)
$1 \times 2 \times 3 \times \cdots \times 100\ = \prod_{n=1}^{100} n = 100!$ (see factorial)

Ellipsis is sometimes used where the pattern is not clear. For example, indicating the indefinite continuation of an irrational number such as:

$$\pi=3.14159265\ldots$$

It can be useful to display an expression compactly, for example:

$$1+4+9+\cdots+n^2+\cdots+400$$

In set notation, the ellipsis is used as horizontal, vertical and diagonal for indicating missing matrix terms, such as the size-n identity matrix:

$$I_n = \begin{bmatrix}1 & 0 & \cdots & 0 \\0 & 1 & \cdots & 0 \\\vdots & \vdots & \ddots & \vdots \\0 & 0 & \cdots & 1 \end{bmatrix}$$

== In computer programming ==
Some programming languages use ellipsis notation, 2 or 3 unspaced dots, to indicate a range, or for a variable argument list.

The CSS text-overflow property can be set to ellipsis, which cuts off text with an ellipsis when it overflows the content area.

== In computer user interface ==
=== More ===
An ellipsis is sometimes used as the label for a button to access user interface that has been omitted – probably due to space limitations – particularly in mobile apps running on small screen devices. This may be described as a "more button".

Similar functionality may be accessible via a button with a hamburger icon (≡) or a narrow version called the kebab icon which is a vertical ellipsis (⋮).

=== More input will be needed ===
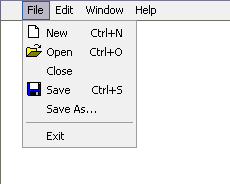
A drop-down menu of file operations

According to some style guides, a menu item or button labeled with a trailing ellipsis requests an operation that cannot be completed without additional information and selecting it will prompt the user for input. Without an ellipsis, selecting the item or button will perform an action without user input.

For example, the menu item "Save" overwrites an existing file whereas "Save as..." prompts the user for save options before saving.

=== Busy/progress ===
Ellipsis is commonly used to indicate that a longer-lasting operation is in progress like "Loading...", "Saving...". These dots may also animate, as a throbber.

Sometimes progress is animated with an ellipse-like construct of repeatedly adding dots to a label in a manner similar to a progress bar.

== In texting ==
In text-based communications, the ellipsis may indicate:

- Floor holding, signal that more is to come, for instance when people break up longer turns in chat.
- Politeness, for instance indicating topic change or hesitation.
- Turn construction unit to signal silence, for example when indicating disagreement, disapproval or confusion.

Although an ellipsis is complete with three periods (...), an ellipsis-like construct with more dots is used to indicate "trailing-off" or "silence". The extent of repetition in itself might serve as an additional contextualization or paralinguistic cue; one paper wrote that they "extend the lexical meaning of the words, add character to the sentences, and allow fine-tuning and personalisation of the message".

While composing a text message, some environments show others in the conversation a typing awareness indicator ellipsis to indicate remote activity.

== Computer representations ==
In computing, several ellipsis characters have been codified.

=== Unicode ===
Unicode defines the following ellipsis characters:

- U+2026 … HORIZONTAL ELLIPSIS
- U+0EAF ຯ LAO ELLIPSIS
- U+1801 ᠁ MONGOLIAN ELLIPSIS
- U+0E2F ฯ THAI CHARACTER PAIYANNOI
- U+22EE ⋮ VERTICAL ELLIPSIS
- U+22EF ⋯ MIDLINE HORIZONTAL ELLIPSIS
- U+22F0 ⋰ UP RIGHT DIAGONAL ELLIPSIS
- U+22F1 ⋱ DOWN RIGHT DIAGONAL ELLIPSIS
- U+FE19 ︙ PRESENTATION FORM FOR VERTICAL HORIZONTAL ELLIPSIS

Unicode recognizes a series of three period characters (U+002E . FULL STOP) as compatibility equivalent (though not canonical) to the horizontal ellipsis character.

=== HTML ===
In HTML, the horizontal ellipsis character may be represented by the entity reference &hellip; (since HTML 4.0), and the vertical ellipsis character by the entity reference &vellip; (since HTML 5.0). Alternatively, in HTML, XML, and SGML, a numeric character reference such as &#x2026; or &#8230; can be used.

=== TeX ===
In the TeX typesetting system, the following types of ellipsis are available:

Name	Glyph	TeX markup
Lower ellipsis	$\ldots$	\ldots
Centred ellipsis	$\cdots$	\cdots
Diagonal ellipsis	$\ddots$	\ddots
Vertical ellipsis	$\vdots$	\vdots

In LaTeX, the reverse orientation of \ddots can be achieved with \reflectbox provided by the graphicx package: \reflectbox{\ddots} yields.

With the amsmath package from AMS-LaTeX, more specific ellipses are provided for math mode.

Markup	Usage	Example	Output
\dotsc	dots with commas	1, 2, \dotsc , 9	$1, 2, \dotsc , 9$
\dotsb	dots with binary operators/relations	1 + 2 + \dotsb + 9	$1 + 2 + \dotsb + 9$
\dotsm	dots with multiplication	A_1 A_2 \dotsm A_9	$A_1 A_2 \dotsm A_9$
\dotsi	dots with integrals	\int_{A_1}\int_{A_2}\dotsi\int_{A_9}	$\int_{A_1}\int_{A_2}\dotsi\int_{A_9}$
\dotso	other dots	123 \dotso 9	$123 \dotso 9$

=== Other ===
The horizontal ellipsis character also appears in older character maps:

- in Windows-1250—Windows-1258 and in IBM/MS-DOS Code page 874, at code 85 (hexadecimal)
- in Mac-Roman, Mac-CentEuro and several other Macintosh encodings, at code C9 (hexadecimal)
- in Ventura International encoding at code C1 (hexadecimal)

Note that ISO/IEC 8859 encoding series provides no code point for ellipsis.

As with all characters, especially those outside the ASCII range, the author, sender and receiver of an encoded ellipsis must be in agreement upon what bytes are being used to represent the character. Naive text processing software may improperly assume that a particular encoding is being used, resulting in mojibake.

=== Input ===
In Windows using a suitable code page, U+2026 … HORIZONTAL ELLIPSIS can be inserted with Alt+0133, using the numeric keypad.

In macOS, it can be inserted with ⌥ Opt+; (on an English language keyboard).

In some Linux distributions, it can be inserted with AltGr+. (this produces an interpunct on other systems), or Compose...

In Android, ellipsis is a long-press key. If Gboard is in alphanumeric layout, change to numeric and special characters layout by pressing ?123 from alphanumeric layout. Once in numeric and special characters layout, long press . key to insert an ellipsis.

In Chinese and sometimes in Japanese, ellipsis characters are made by entering two consecutive horizontal ellipses, each with Unicode code point U+2026. In vertical texts, the application should rotate the symbol accordingly.

== See also ==
- Aposiopesis – Figure of speech: an unfinished sentence
- Caesura – Pause or break in poetry or music
- Code folding or holophrasting – switching between full text and an ellipsis
- Cohesion (linguistics) – Grammatical and lexical linking in text
- Dinkus – Typographic device ( * * * ) to indicate a change – a row of three dots (usually widely separated) alone in the middle of a gap between two paragraphs, to indicate a sub-chapter.
- Elision – Omission of sounds in words or phrases. In written text, this is sometimes denoted using the horizontal ellipsis.
- An em dash — is sometimes used instead of an ellipsis, especially in written dialogue.
- Leader (typography) – Row of dots used in tables of contents
- Leiden Conventions – Symbols for marking text from manuscripts
- Line break (poetry) – Subdivision of a poem
