= Shirley Fong-Torres =

American chef and writer

- Born: November 16, 1946
- Died: June 18, 2011 (aged 64)
- Education: University of California, Berkeley
- Occupations: Chef, Food Writer
- Relatives: Ben Fong-Torres (brother); Tina Dong Pavao (daughter)

Shirley Fong-Torres (November 16, 1946 – June 18, 2011) was a chef, tour operator, and popular travel and food writer based in San Francisco, California, US.

== Early life ==
Fong-Torres was born on November 16, 1946. Her father was Ricardo Torres. Due to the Chinese Exclusion Act, Fong-Torres' father (born Fong Kwok Seung), changed his surname to Torres and posed as a Filipino in order to immigrate to the United States. His family later adopted the hyphenated surname, Fong-Torres. As a child, she worked in her father's restaurants in Hayward and Oakland's Chinatown.

== Education ==
Fong-Torres was a graduate of Oakland High School and the University of California, Berkeley.

== Career ==
Early in her career, Fong-Torres worked at Levi Strauss as an operations manager in women's merchandising and taught middle school. She later founded Wok Wiz Chinatown Tours (1987), which still offers cultural and culinary themed tours to locals and tourists. She developed the popular specialty tour "I Can't Believe I Ate My Way Through Chinatown." Wok Wiz Chinatown Tours continues today, led by her daughter, Tina Dong Pavao.

Fong-Torres published four books: Wok Wiz Chinatown Tour Cookbook [1988], San Francisco Chinatown: A Walking Tour [1991, China Books], In The Chinese Kitchen With Shirley Fong-Torres [1993, Pacific View Press], and The Woman Who Ate Chinatown [2008].

== Personal life ==
Fong-Torres' brother Ben Fong-Torres is an American rock journalist, author, and broadcaster.

Fong-Torres died of leukemia on June 18, 2011.
