= List of Atari Lynx games =

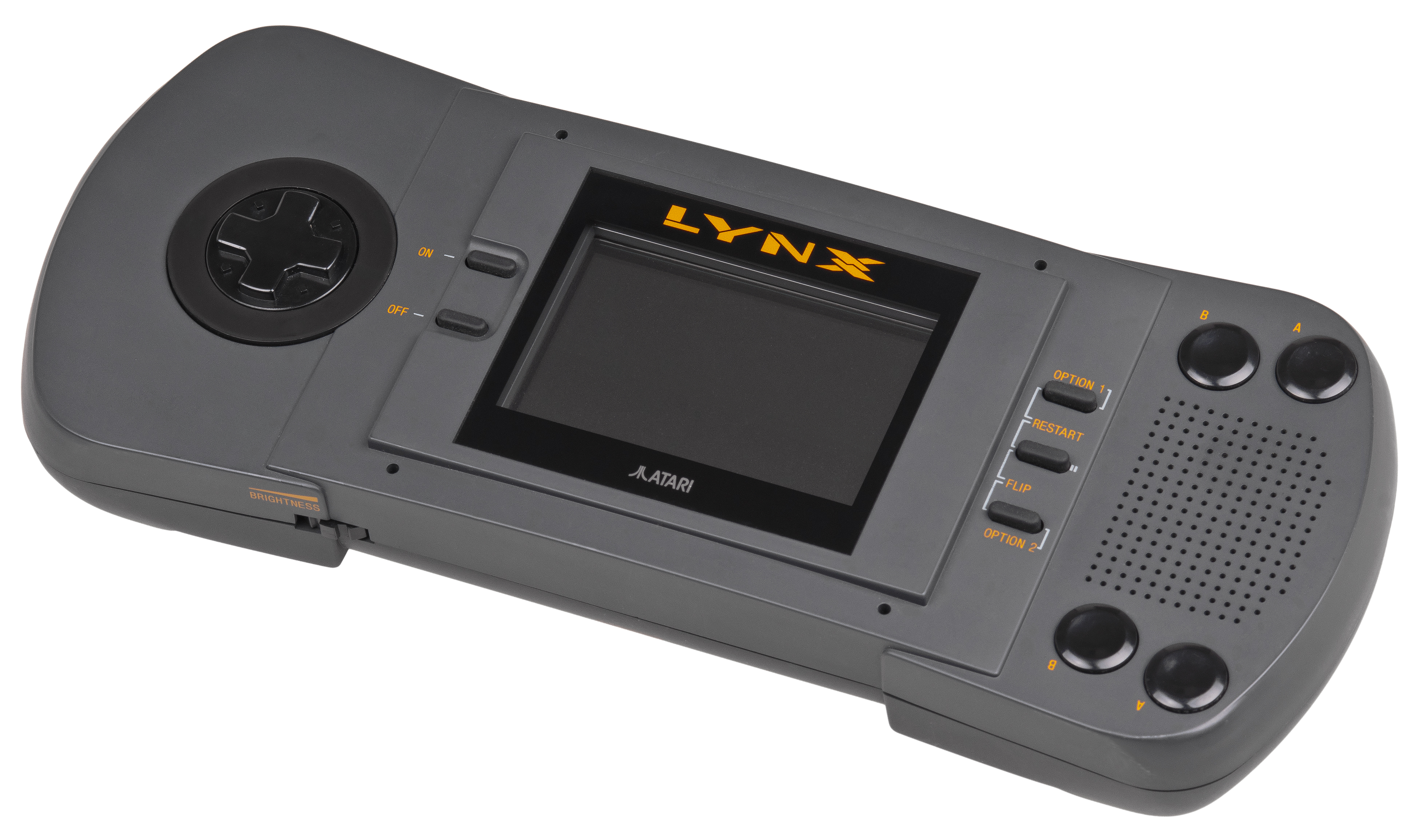
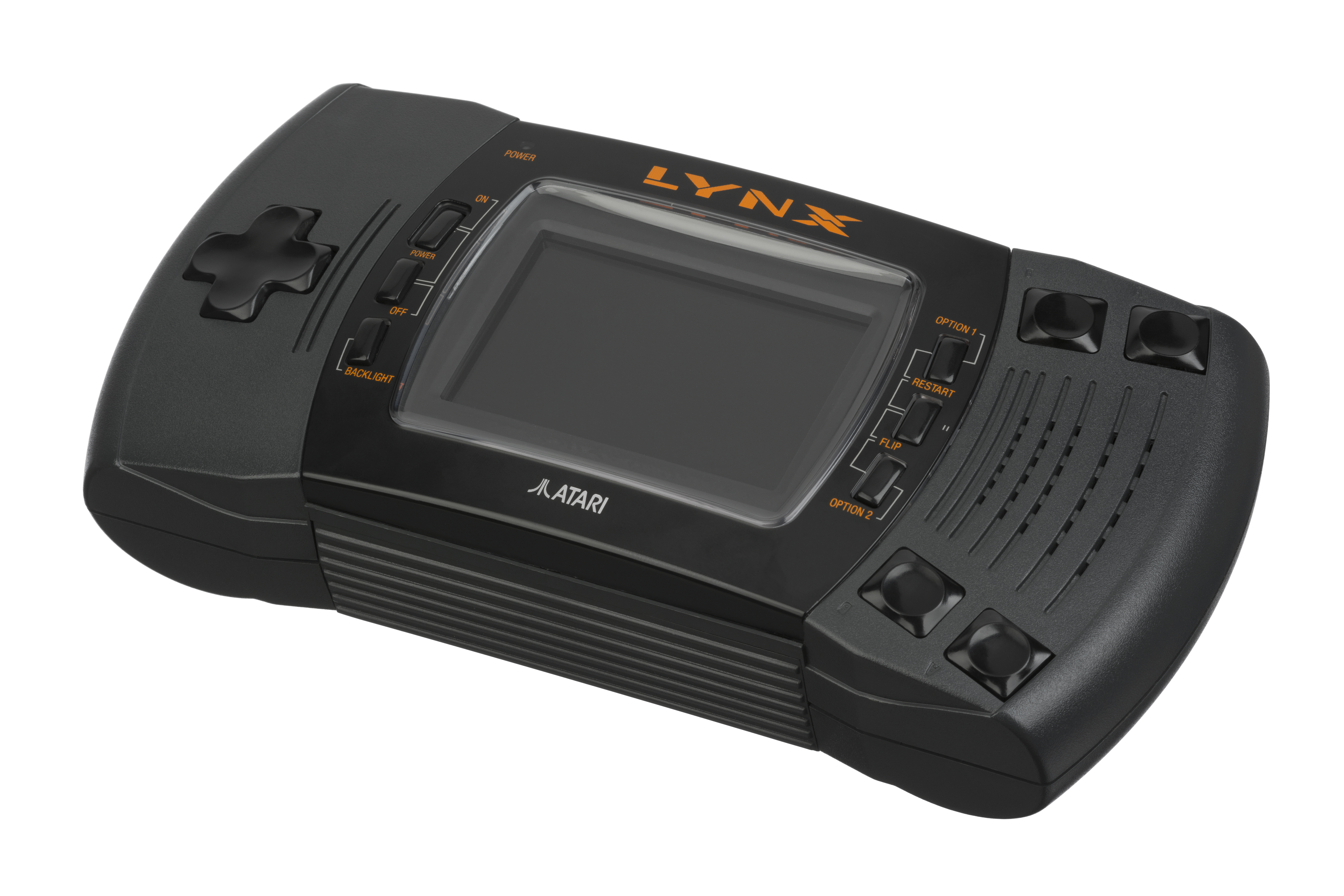
Left to right: Atari Lynx I and Atari Lynx II

The Atari Lynx is a 16-bit handheld game console developed by Atari Corporation and designed by Epyx, released in North America in 1989, with a second revision called Lynx II being also released worldwide in July 1991. It was the second and last handheld console to be released under the Atari brand, succeeding the handheld iteration of Touch Me from 1978. The following list contains all of the games released for the Lynx.

Unveiled at the January's 1989 Winter Consumer Electronics Show as the Handy before being rechristened as the Lynx, the system was released to compete with 8-bit and 16-bit handheld consoles such as the Game Boy, Game Gear, and TurboExpress, initially starting off successfully. Due to stiff competition in the home console market at the time, Atari Corp. focused their resources into the Atari Jaguar before ceasing internal game development in 1996 and eventually discontinuing the platform. There were 71 officially released titles on cartridge during the system's life span on the market, with 3 more titles being released after its discontinuation by Telegames. Originally released at US$179.99, Atari dropped the price to $99.99 when the Lynx II was launched. Its unknown how many Lynx units were sold but it has been suggested that between 1 and 3 million units were sold in total. Also listed are the unlicensed aftermarket (homebrew) titles.

== Commercially released games ==
Listed here are all 71 (Note: This number is always up to date by this script.) officially released Atari Lynx games.

Number of games released by region
Region	Region description	Games
NA	North America and other NTSC territories.	71
PAL	PAL/SECAM territories: much of Europe and Australia.	71
JP	Japan and other NTSC-J territories.	17

Note: Atari Lynx is a handheld console and therefore NTSC, PAL or NTSC-J does not matter.

Title	Developer(s)	Publisher(s)	Release date(s)	Regions released
APB	Quicksilver Software	Atari Corporation	1991	NA, PAL
Awesome Golf	Hand Made Software	Atari Corporation	1991	NA, PAL
Baseball Heroes	Atari Corporation	Atari Corporation	1992	NA, PAL
Basketbrawl	Hamilton and Associates	Atari Corporation	1992	NA, PAL
Batman Returns	Atari Corporation	Atari Corporation	1992	NA, PAL
BattleWheels	Beyond Games	Atari Corporation	1993	NA, PAL
Battlezone 2000	Hand Made Software	Atari Corporation	1995	NA, PAL
Bill & Ted's Excellent Adventure	Al Baker & Associates	Atari Corporation	1991	NA, PAL
Blockout	P.Z.Karen Co. Development Group	Atari Corporation	1991	NA, PAL
Blue Lightning	Epyx	Atari Corporation; Mumin Corporation^{JP}	1989	NA, PAL, JP
California Games	Epyx	Atari Corporation; Mumin Corporation^{JP}	1989	NA, PAL, JP
Checkered Flag	Atari Corporation	Atari Corporation	1991	NA, PAL
Chip's Challenge	Epyx	Atari Corporation; Mumin Corporation^{JP}	1989	NA, PAL, JP
Crystal Mines II	Color Dreams	Atari Corporation	1992	NA, PAL
Desert Strike	Teque London	Telegames	1993	NA, PAL
Dinolympics	Imagitec Design	Atari Corporation	1992	NA, PAL
Dirty Larry: Renegade Cop	Knight Technologies	Atari Corporation	1992	NA, PAL
Double Dragon	Knight Technologies	Telegames	1993	NA, PAL
Dracula the Undead	Hand Made Software	Atari Corporation	1991	NA, PAL
Electrocop	Epyx	Atari Corporation; Mumin Corporation^{JP}	1989	NA, PAL, JP
European Soccer Challenge	Krisalis Software	Telegames	1993	NA, PAL
The Fidelity Ultimate Chess Challenge	Telegames	Telegames	1991	NA, PAL
Gates of Zendocon	Epyx	Atari Corporation; Mumin Corporation^{JP}	1989	NA, PAL, JP
Gauntlet: The Third Encounter	Epyx	Atari Corporation; Mumin Corporation^{JP}	1990	NA, PAL, JP
Gordo 106	Tenth Planet Software	Atari Corporation	1993	NA, PAL
Hard Drivin'	NuFX	Atari Corporation	1991	NA, PAL
Hockey	Alpine Software	Atari Corporation	1992	NA, PAL
Hydra	NuFX	Atari Corporation	1992	NA, PAL
Ishidō: The Way of Stones	Atari Corporation	Atari Corporation	1991	NA, PAL
Jimmy Connors' Tennis	Hand Made Software	Atari Corporation	1993	NA, PAL
Joust	Shadowsoft	Shadowsoft	1992	NA, PAL
Klax	Atari Corporation	Atari Corporation; Mumin Corporation^{JP}	1990	NA, PAL, JP
Kung Food	Lore Games	Atari Corporation	1992	NA, PAL
Lemmings	DMA Design	Atari Corporation	1993	NA, PAL
Lynx Casino	Brian A. Rice, Inc.	Atari Corporation	1992	NA, PAL
Malibu Bikini Volleyball	Hand Made Software	Atari Corporation	1993	NA, PAL
Ms. Pac-Man	Atari Corporation	Atari Corporation; Mumin Corporation^{JP}	1990	NA, PAL, JP
NFL Football	BlueSky Software	Atari Corporation	1992	NA, PAL
Ninja Gaiden	BlueSky Software	Atari Corporation	1991	NA, PAL
Ninja Gaiden III: The Ancient Ship of Doom	Atari Corporation	Atari Corporation	1993	NA, PAL
Pac-Land	Atari Corporation	Atari Corporation	1991	NA, PAL
Paperboy	Al Baker & Associates	Atari Corporation; Mumin Corporation^{JP}	1990	NA, PAL, JP
Pinball Jam	Atari Corporation	Atari Corporation	1992	NA, PAL
Pit-Fighter	Al Baker & Associates	Atari Corporation	1992	NA, PAL
Power Factor	Hand Made Software	Atari Corporation	1993	NA, PAL
Qix	Knight Technologies	Telegames	1991	NA, PAL
Rampage	Atari Corporation	Atari Corporation; Mumin Corporation^{JP}	1990	NA, PAL, JP
Rampart	Atari Corporation	Atari Corporation	1992	NA, PAL
RoadBlasters	Atari Corporation	Atari Corporation; Mumin Corporation^{JP}	1990	NA, PAL, JP
Robo-Squash	NuFX	Atari Corporation; Mumin Corporation^{JP}	1990	NA, PAL, JP
Robotron: 2084	Shadowsoft	Shadowsoft	1991	NA, PAL
Rygar	NuFX	Atari Corporation; Mumin Corporation^{JP}	1990	NA, PAL, JP
S.T.U.N. Runner	Atari Corporation	Atari Corporation	1991	NA, PAL
Scrapyard Dog	Creative Software Designs	Atari Corporation	1991	NA, PAL
Shadow of the Beast	Digital Developments	Atari Corporation	1992	NA, PAL
Shanghai	Atari Corporation	Atari Corporation; Mumin Corporation^{JP}	1990	NA, PAL, JP
Steel Talons	NuFX	Atari Corporation	1992	NA, PAL
Super Asteroids & Missile Command	Atari Corporation	Atari Corporation	1995	NA, PAL
Super Off Road	Leland Interactive Media	Telegames	1993	NA, PAL
Super Skweek	Loriciel	Atari Corporation^{NA} Loriciel^{PAL}	1991	NA, PAL
Switchblade II	Optimus Software	Atari Corporation	1992	NA, PAL
Todd's Adventures in Slime World	Epyx	Atari Corporation; Mumin Corporation^{JP}	1990	NA, PAL, JP
Toki	Atari Corporation	Atari Corporation	1992	NA, PAL
Tournament Cyberball	BlueSky Software	Atari Corporation	1991	NA, PAL
Turbo Sub	NuFX	Atari Corporation	1991	NA, PAL
Viking Child	Imagitec Design	Atari Corporation	1991	NA, PAL
Warbirds	Atari Corporation	Atari Corporation	1991	NA, PAL
World Class Fussball/Soccer	Brian A. Rice, Inc.	Atari Corporation	1992	NA, PAL
Xenophobe	Epyx	Atari Corporation; Mumin Corporation^{JP}	1990	NA, PAL, JP
Xybots	NuFX	Atari Corporation	1991	NA, PAL
Zarlor Mercenary	Epyx	Atari Corporation; Mumin Corporation^{JP}	1990	NA, PAL, JP

== Unlicensed games ==
There are currently 63 unlicensed games on this list. (Note: This number is always up to date by this script.)

Title	Developer(s)	Publisher(s)	Date first released	Regions released
Alpine Games	Duranik	Duranik / L.Baumstark / Songbird Productions	January 25, 2004	Worldwide
Alpine Games Bonus Cartridge	Duranik	Duranik	February 20, 2006	Worldwide
Always winter, never Christmas	Karri Kaksonen	White Lynx	December 6, 2017	Worldwide
Assembloids	PriorArt	poly.play	2019	Worldwide
Asteroids Chasers	Yastuna Games	Yastuna Game / Songbird Productions	2001	Worldwide
Bitchy	Rygar	Rygar	2009	Worldwide
Bubble Trouble	Lore Design Limited	Telegames	1994	NA, PAL
Centipede	Shadowsoft	Video61	2003	Worldwide
CGE 5th	Songbird Productions	Songbird Productions	2002	Worldwide
Championship Rally	Songbird Productions	Songbird Productions	2000	Worldwide
Conquest of Zow	Harry Dodgson	MyAtari	2002	Worldwide
Crystal Mines II: Buried Treasure	Ken Beckett	Songbird Productions	1999	Worldwide
CyberVirus	Beyond Games	Songbird Productions	2002	Worldwide
CyberVirus: Cinci-Classic Edition	Beyond Games	Songbird Productions	2001	Worldwide
Daemonsgate	Imagitec Design	B&C Computervisions	2003	Worldwide
Ejagfest Slideshow	Björn Spruck	Luchs Soft	December 30, 2017	Worldwide
Eye of the Beholder	NuFX	EricDeLee	2011	Worldwide
Fat Bobby	Lore Design Limited	Telegames	1997	NA, PAL
Flappy Bird	tonma	White Lynx	January 4, 2017	Worldwide
Fruit'Y - Playing with edibles	Gisberto Rondinella	Retroguru	2025	Worldwide
Hanoi	Devlynx, ZoneLynx	Luchs Soft	June 9, 2017	Worldwide
Hot Dog	Lore Design Limited	Beta Phase Games	January 6, 2011	Worldwide
Hyperdrome	Atari Corporation	Telegames	1999	NA, PAL
Krazy Ace Miniature Golf	Telegames	Telegames	1993, 2019	NA, PAL
Lexis	Shadowsoft	Songbird Productions	1999	Worldwide
Lode Runner	Douglas E. Smith	Broderbund	July 16, 2008	Worldwide
Loopz	Hand Made Software	Songbird Productions	2002	Worldwide
Lynx Othello	Harry Dodgson	Harry Dodgson	1999	Worldwide
Lynx Reloaded	Sage	Björn Spruck	2009	Worldwide
Lynxopoly	Matthias Aschenbrenner	Hexgames	2009	Worldwide
MegaPak Vol. 1	Songbird Productions	Songbird Productions	2008	Worldwide
P.I.T.S.	B. Schick	DVPI GmbH	1994	PAL
Poker	Atari Corporation	Team Jaguar	2010	Worldwide
PokerMania	Markus Wuehl	MW Software	2003	Worldwide
Ponx	Songbird Productions	Songbird Productions	June 18, 1999	Worldwide
Pounce!	Atari Corporation	Video61	2007	Worldwide
QuadroMania	RPM Software	Beta Phase Games	August 18, 2017	Worldwide
Raiden	BlueSky Software	Telegames	1997	NA, PAL
RED	Ancient World Computing	Côté Gamers	2025	Worldwide
Relief Pitcher	Atari Corporation	Team Jaguar	January 6, 2011	Worldwide
Remnant: Planar Wars 3D	Songbird Productions	Songbird Productions	2000	Worldwide
Retro X-MASsacre	Luchs Soft	Luchs Soft	December 6, 2018	Worldwide
Reversi	Atari Corporation	Video61	2007	Worldwide
Road Riot 4WD	Images Software	B&C Computervisions	2003	Worldwide
SFX: The Ultimate Audio Tool	Songbird Productions	Songbird Productions	1998	Worldwide
Shaken, not stirred: eJagFest Edition	Karri Kaksonen	White Lynx	October 4, 2018	PAL
S.I.M.I.S.	B. Schick, M. Domin	L. Baumstark / Songbird Productions	1998	Worldwide
Sky Raider Redux	Songbird Productions	Songbird Productions	2025	Worldwide
SokoMania	Markus Wuehl	MW Software	1999	Worldwide
Solitaire!	Karri Kaksonen	White Lynx	2009	Worldwide
Space Battle	Harry Dodgson	Luchs Soft	April 1, 2019	Worldwide
Star Blader	Gisberto Rondinella	Retroguru	2025	Worldwide
T-Tris	B. Schick	L. Baumstark / Songbird Productions	1996	Worldwide
Unnamed	Marcin Siwek	Songbird Productions	March 31, 2021	Worldwide
Unseen	Marcin Siwek	Luchs Soft	October 28, 2018	Worldwide
Wee Ninja	Playsoft	Songbird Productions	April 26, 2026	Worldwide
Weltenschlächter	Luchs Soft	Luchs Soft	April 29, 2017	Worldwide
Wyvern Tales	Jasper van Turnhout	Nomad Studio	April 4, 2018	Worldwide
Xump - The Final Run	Gisberto Rondinella	Retroguru	April 19, 2019	Worldwide
Xump2 - Back to Space	Gisberto Rondinella	Retroguru	2025	Worldwide
Yatsuna Vol. 1: The Alchemy of Cubes	Fadest	Retro-Gaming Connexion	2006	PAL
Yatsuna Vol. 2: The Space Incident	Fadest	Retro-Gaming Connexion	2008	PAL
Zaku	PenguiNet	Super Fighter Team	October 24, 2009	Worldwide

== See also ==
- List of cancelled Atari Lynx games
- Lists of video games
