= List of cancelled Atari Lynx games =

This is a list of cancelled games for the Atari Lynx.

== List ==
There are currently 41 games on this list. (Note: This number is always up to date by this script.)

List of cancelled Atari Lynx games
Title	Genre	Developer(s)	Publisher(s)	Planned Release Date/Last Year Developed or Mentioned	Notes/Reasons
720°	Sports	Atari Corporation	Atari Corporation	June 1992	Early prototype exists - has never been released.
Alien vs Predator	First-person shooter	Images Software	Atari Corporation	7 March 1995	A more further developed build containing all three playable characters is planned to be sold by Beta Phase Games in the future.
Barbarian Bodyguard	Action	Epyx	Atari Corporation	25 October 2002	Interview with its author revealed it was approximately 33% complete, however no screenshots are available and the source code is lost.
Battletoads	Beat 'em up, Platform	Leland Interactive Media	Telegames	12 February 2003	No prototype has surfaced.
Bleaker	Action, Adventure, Role-playing game	Digital Thunder	Digital Thunder	March 2003	No prototype has surfaced.
Blue Earth	Role-playing game	Digital Thunder	Digital Thunder	March 2003	No prototype has surfaced.
Blood & Guts Hockey	Sports	NuFX	Atari Corporation	1992	Artwork and screenshots exists but no prototype has surfaced.
Cabal	Shooting gallery	Fabtek	Atari Corporation	April 1992	Artwork and screenshots exists, a prototype has been released by The Brewing Academy after being found on a floppy disk.
Defender & Stargate Double Bill	Shoot 'em up	Shadowsoft	Williams Electronics	March 1993	Compilation of Defender and Stargate. No prototype has surfaced.
Dragnet	Demo	42Bastian Schick	42Bastian Schick	1995	ROM image was released online.
Dungeon Slayers	Role-playing game	Atari Corporation	Atari Corporation	22 December 2011	Prototype exists but has not been made available online and source code currently resides with Harry Dodgson.
Dyna Blaster	Action, Maze, Strategy	Ubi Soft	Ubi Soft	2 April 2007	Only a single screenshot exists and no prototype has surfaced.
Edward 2000	Breakout	Mr. Castle	Mr. Castle	2 August 1996	Development was halted and no screenshots nor prototype has surfaced.
Escape from the Planet of the Robot Monsters	Shooter	Atari Corporation	Atari Corporation	March 2015	Only a single screenshot exists.
Evergreen	—N/a	JagSoft	JagSoft	March 2003	No prototype has surfaced.
Fire Power	Action	Silent Software	—N/a	14 May 2015	Interview with its author revealed that no actual development started on Lynx version due to internal conflict between Epyx.
Full Court Press Basketball	Sports	Ringler Studios	Atari Corporation	1992	Artwork and screenshots exists, a prototype has been released by The Brewing Academy after being found on a floppy disk.
The Furies	Action	Digital Thunder	Digital Thunder	March 2003	No prototype has surfaced.
GeoDuel	Action	Atari Corporation	Atari Corporation	June 1992	Artwork and screenshots exists, a prototype has been released by The Brewing Academy after being found on a floppy disk.
Green-Thang	Platform, Run and gun	Creative Edge Software	Atari Corporation	1 September 2020	Also known as Frogs.
The Guardians: Storm Over Doria	Role-playing game	Knight Technologies	Telegames	1992	30% complete, a prototype has been released by The Brewing Academy after being found on a floppy disk.
Heavyweight Contender	Sports	Ringler Studios	Atari Corporation	1992	Artwork and screenshots exists but no prototype has surfaced.
Hellraiser	Action, Maze, Puzzle	Color Dreams	Color Dreams	1990	Promotional flyer advertising the Lynx version exists but no prototype has surfaced.
Iron Reign	Simulation, Strategy	Digital Thunder	Digital Thunder	March 2003	No prototype has surfaced.
Jimmy White's 'Whirlwind' Snooker	Sports	Archer Maclean	—N/a	February 1993	Conversion of the home computer original.
Marlboro Go!	Racing, Sports	Digital Image	Philip Morris USA	1993	ROM image was released online.
Mechtiles	First-person shooter	Beyond Games	Atari Corporation	5 January 2006	Its ROM image and source code were preserved but have not been made available online.
Metal Mutant	Action, Adventure	Silmarils	Atari Corporation	25 October 2003	Silmarils co-founder Louis-Marie Rocques stated its planned release was cancelled by Atari and no prototype has surfaced.
ParaLemmings	Shooter	Laurens Simonis	Laurens Simonis	1997	ROM image was released online.
Pitfall: The Mayan Adventure	Platform	Imagitec Design	Atari Corporation	16 July 2015	Development on the Lynx version was scrapped due to Atari Corp. focusing on the Jaguar instead and no prototype has surfaced.
Pro Quarterback	Sports	Leland Interactive Media	Telegames	December 1992	Unknown if actual development started on Lynx version.
Puzzler 2000	Puzzle	Markus Wuehl	Markus Wuehl	1998	ROM image was released online.
Ren & Stimpy	—N/a	Acclaim Entertainment	—N/a	February 1993	Based upon the eponymous animated series from Nickelodeon.
Rolling Thunder	Run and gun	Atari Corporation	Atari Corporation	November 1992	Artwork and screenshots exists, a prototype has been released by The Brewing Academy after being found on a floppy disk.
Soccer Kid	Platform	Krisalis Software	Telegames	17 November 2016	No prototype has surfaced.
Space War	Space combat simulation	Atari Corporation	Atari Corporation	September 1995	Artwork and screenshots exist but no prototype has surfaced online.
Strider II	Action, Platform	Tiertex Design Studios	U.S. Gold	July 1991	50% complete but no prototype has surfaced.
TNT Terry	Action, Maze, Strategy	Laurens Simonis, Yiri T. Kohl	Laurens Simonis	16 November 2009	Prototype exists but has not been made available online.
Ultra Vortex	Fighting	Beyond Games	Atari Corporation	1994	Currently being completed for release by Songbird Productions.
Vindicators	Run and gun	Atari Corporation	Atari Corporation	20 September 2011	Prototype exists and has been released by The Brewing Academy after being found on a floppy disk.
Wolfenstein 3D	First-person shooter	id Software	Atari Corporation	30 April 2018	No actual development started on Lynx version due to an unrealized deal between id and Atari that was never fully instigated.

== See also ==
- List of Atari Lynx games
- Lists of video games
