= List of cancelled Atari Jaguar games =

The Atari Jaguar is a home video game console released by Atari in 1993. It was marketed as the first 64-bit game system. It was launched as part of the fifth generation of video game consoles, but unlike later fifth-generation consoles, it struggled to capture major market share from the dominant last generation consoles, the Genesis and the Super NES. In turn, game development was complicated by the complex multi-chip architecture, hardware bugs, and poor programming tools, which lead to a large number of game cancellations. Atari attempted to extend the system's lifespan by releasing the Jaguar CD add-on, and emphasizing the Jaguar's price, but it still failed to find its niche. Atari internally abandoned the system by the end of 1995, liquidating its inventory by 1996. The commercial failure of the Jaguar, in turn, prompted Atari to leave the console market and restructure itself as a third-party developer. This list documents games that were announced or in development for the Jaguar at some point, but did not end up being released for it in any capacity. It also documents cancelled Jaguar CD games.

== Games ==
There are currently 209 games on this list. (Note: This number is always up to date by this script.)

List of cancelled Atari Jaguar games
Title	Notes/Reasons	Developer(s)	Publisher(s)
AC/DC: Defenders of Metal	In 2003, information leaked regarding a Streets of Rage-styled game featuring the members of AC/DC as playable characters being in development for the Jaguar, though no such game ever materialized in any capacity.	Pacific Gameworks	V-Real Interactive
Aero the Acro-Bat	A Jaguar version of the 1993 Sega Genesis and SNES release was announced and scheduled for release across 1994, but never materialized.	Softgold Computerspiele GmbH	Sunsoft
Age Of Darkness	Artwork exists but no actual development started.	OMC Games	Hellified Games
Akira	An adaptation of the 1988 anime film Akira was planned for release on the Jaguar, Sega Genesis, SNES and Sega CD in 1995, with Game Boy and Game Gear games based on the film also being considered. Gameplay and content varied wildly among versions, but disagreements in the direction of the games with THQ occurred and the game fell onto the backburner, never releasing for any system. The Genesis version later leaked onto the internet in 2019.	Hand Made Software	THQ
Alien Storm	In October 1993, Atari Corporation filed a lawsuit against Sega for an alleged infringement of a patent originally created by Atari Corp. in the 1980s, and Atari sought a preliminary injunction to stop manufacturing, usage, and sales of hardware and software for the Sega Genesis and Game Gear. On September 28, 1994, both parties reached a settlement involving a cross-licensing agreement to publish up to five games each year across their systems until 2001. A version of Alien Storm was one of the first five games approved from the deal by Sega in order to be released on the Jaguar. However, with the Jaguar being discontinued in 1996, and Atari's subsequent drop out of the console hardware business, none of the games announced as part of the deal ever released on Jaguar.	Sanritsu Denki	Atari Corporation
Alien vs Predator 2: Annihilation	Following the release of Alien vs Predator for the Atari Jaguar, the Atari team convened at Atari producer Ted Tahquechi's home, where they rewatched the Alien and Predator films to exchange ideas they wanted to include into an expanded CD version of AVP. In 1995, Alien vs Predator: The CD/Alien vs Predator 2: Annihilation (AVP: The CD/AVP 2: Annihilation) was announced for the Atari Jaguar CD, planning for a February 1996 release date. After the launch of Ultra Vortek, Atari invited Beyond Games to discuss their interest in making a sequel to AVP for the Jaguar CD. According to former Beyond Games staffers Kris Johnson and Clark Stacey, their sequel would focus on story and feature plenty of action. The project was approved by both 20th Century Fox and Atari, becoming Beyond Games' main development focus. In 1996, Atari abandoned negotiations with 20th Century Fox due to licensing issues, shortly before discontinuing the Jaguar platform and leaving the console market to merge with JTS, resulting in the project's cancellation during the planning phase. However, Johnson and Stacey claimed that 20th Century Fox scrapped the project because they felt the plot had become too drawn out and did not want to add new lore into the franchise without further oversight.	Beyond Games	Atari Corporation
Allegiance	No actual development started on Jaguar version.	Team17	—N/a
Alone in the Dark		Infogrames	Infogrames
American Football	Announced in 1993. Also known as 3D Football.	Park Place Productions	Parker Brothers
Apeshit	Development on the project was scrapped in favor of Lobo.	Ocean Software	Ocean Software
The Architect	One of the first 14 titles to be greenlit for the Jaguar.| data-sort-value="" style="background: var(--background-color-interactive, #ececec); color: var(--color-base, inherit); vertical-align: middle; text-align: center; " class="table-na" | —N/a	Atari Corporation	
Arena Battles	data-sort-value="" style="background: var(--background-color-interactive, #ececec); color: var(--color-base, inherit); vertical-align: middle; text-align: center; " class="table-na" | —N/a	—N/a	
Arlo Armadillo vs. The Bugs Below	Part of the scrapped Atari Mascot Character game project. Artwork and proposal document exists.	Atari Corporation	Atari Corporation
Artemis	No actual development started on Jaguar CD version beyond planning phase.	Springer Spaniel Software	Springer Spaniel Software
The Assassin	Two ROM image demos were released for free by the developers. Also planned for the Atari 8-bit computers.	OMC Games	Hellified Games
Assault: Covert Ops	Artwork and promotional flyer exists.	MidNite Entertainment Group	MidNite Entertainment Group
Asteroids	Technical demo. A ROM image was leaked online in 2017.	iThink	—N/a
Automaniacs	Spiritual successor to Club Drive. Development was halted for unknown reasons.	Visual Dimensions 3D	Visual Dimensions 3D
Azeron		Beyond Games	Beyond Games
Bases Loaded		Jaleco	Jaleco
Batman Forever: The Arcade Game	Conversion of the PlayStation port.	Probe Entertainment	Atari Corporation
Battle Chess		Krisalis Software	Interplay Productions
Battle Lords	Currently under ownership of Edgies CEO David Wightman. Nearly complete. Also planned for PC.	Creative Edge Software	Atari Corporation
BattleWheels	Updated conversion of the Atari Lynx original.	Beyond Games	Beyond Games
Big Red Racing	—N/a	Big Red Software	Domark
B.I.O.S.Fear	Promotional press kit exists.	Zinc Studios	All Systems Go Technologies
Bomberman Legends	Source code recovered by original authors. Artwork exists.	Genetic Fantasia	Atari Corporation, Hudson Soft
Buggy Ball	Conversion of the arcade original and intended for the unreleased Jaguar VR peripheral.	Virtuality Entertainment	Virtuality Entertainment
Casino Royale		Telegrames	Telegrames
Center Court Tennis	Announced in 1994.	Zeppelin Games	—N/a
Centipede 2000	Source code is lost. Footage of the in-game engine exists.	Dark Science	Atari Corporation
Cheesy	First announced in May 1994. Move to and released on PlayStation. Due to commercial and critical failure of the system.	CTA Developments	Ocean Software
Chopper	Inspired by Choplifter. Currently under ownership of Edgies CEO David Wightman. Nearly complete.	Creative Edge Software	Atari Corporation
Circle of Four	No actual development started due to lack of funding.	JV Enterprises	—N/a
Cisco Heat		Jaleco	Atari Corporation
Classic Traxx	Game design document proposal exists.	Virtuality Entertainment	Atari Corporation
ClayFighter		Interplay Productions	Interplay Productions
The Cleansing: Starring Bill Donahue	20% complete.	Band In The Box Entertainment	—N/a
Commander Blood		Cryo Interactive	Atari Corporation, Microfolie's Editions, Mindscape
Commando		Microïds	—N/a
Cops	Based upon the Fox TV program of the same name. Proposal document exists.	Pacific Gameworks	V-Real Interactive
Country Vid Grid	100% complete. No prototype has surfaced.	High Voltage Software	Atari Corporation
Creature Shock	Development on Jaguar CD port was cancelled after the poor reception of a video demo showcased at Autumn ECTS '95 and several delays.	Argonaut Software	Atari Corporation, Virgin Interactive Entertainment
Crime Patrol		American Laser Games	—N/a
Cyber Knights		Imagitec Design	—N/a
Cygnus	| data-sort-value="" style="background: var(--background-color-interactive, #ececec); color: var(--color-base, inherit); vertical-align: middle; text-align: center; " class="table-na" | —N/a	—N/a	
Dactyl Nightmare	Conversion of the arcade original and intended for the unreleased Jaguar VR peripheral.	Virtuality Entertainment	Virtuality Entertainment
Dactyl Joust	A 3D reimagining of the original 1982 arcade game, which was also intended to be included as a bonus. Footage exists.	High Voltage Software	Atari Corporation
Dante's Inferno	Based upon the first part of Dante Alighieri's 14th-century epic poem Divine Comedy. An early playable demo was released by defunct Jaguar Sector II website under a CD-ROM compilation titled Jaguar Extremist Pack #1 in 2004. Also planned for PC.	Gorilla Systems Corporation	Atari Corporation
Dark Guardian Episode 1: Unknown Enemy	An early playable demo was showcased to the public at JagFest 2K1. A ROM image of the demo was leaked online in 2018.	OMC Games	Hellified Games
Deathwatch	Source code is lost and no prototype has surfaced.	Data Design Interactive	Atari Corporation
Defcon 1	Vaporware title.	Dark Knight Games; Visual Dimensions 3D	Dark Knight Games
Demolition Man	Conversion of the 3DO original. Development on Jaguar CD port was cancelled after several delays.	Virgin Interactive Entertainment	Atari Corporation
Deus	Released on PC.	Silmarils	—N/a
Discworld	Former Perfect 10 Productions employee stated no actual development started on Jaguar CD version beyond discussion phase due to market issues.	Perfect 10 Productions	Atari Corporation
Doom II		id Software	—N/a
Dracula the Undead	First announced in 1993. Update of the Atari Lynx original.	Atari Corporation	Atari Corporation
Dragon's Lair II: Time Warp	A non-playable demo was included in the Jaguar CD port of Brain Dead 13.	Epicenter Interactive	ReadySoft Incorporated
Droppings		Delta Music Systems Incorporation	—N/a
Dungeon Depths	Artwork and promotional flyer exists.	MidNite Entertainment Group	MidNite Entertainment Group
Earthworm Jim	Source code of the conversion and alpha build consisting of basic character animations are lost.	Softgold Computerspiele GmbH	Atari Corporation
Earthworm Jim 2	Under consideration but no actual development began on Jaguar version.	Shiny Entertainment	—N/a
Eternal Darkness: Scent Of the Spider	Under planning phase but no actual development started.	OMC Games	Hellified Games
European Soccer Challenge	Conversion of the Atari Lynx port.	Telegames	Telegames
Evidence: The Last Report	Released on PC and PlayStation.	Microïds	Microïds
Evolution: Dino Dudes 2		Imagitec Design	Atari Corporation
Exorex	Conversion of the arcade original.	Virtuality Entertainment	Atari Corporation
Falcon		Spectrum HoloByte	Spectrum HoloByte
FIFA International Soccer	No actual development started on Jaguar version due to the commercial and critical failure of the platform.	Electronic Arts	Electronic Arts
Firestorm: Thunderhawk 2		Core Design	—N/a
Formula One Grand Prix		MicroProse	MicroProse
Frank Thomas Big Hurt Baseball	| data-sort-value="" style="background: var(--background-color-interactive, #ececec); color: var(--color-base, inherit); vertical-align: middle; text-align: center; " class="table-na" | —N/a	Acclaim Entertainment	
Frankenstein: Through the Eyes of the Monster		Alexandria	—N/a
Freelancer 2120: The Asaka Contract	Also planned for PC and PlayStation.	Imagitec Design	Atari Corporation
Gain Ground	In October 1993, Atari Corporation filed a lawsuit against Sega for an alleged infringement of a patent originally created by Atari Corp. in the 1980s, and Atari sought a preliminary injunction to stop manufacturing, usage, and sales of hardware and software for the Sega Genesis and Game Gear. On September 28, 1994, both parties reached a settlement involving a cross-licensing agreement to publish up to five games each year across their systems until 2001. A version of Gain Ground was announced as a game to be released on the Jaguar should one of the first five games in consideration were unable to be released. However, with the Jaguar being discontinued in 1996, and Atari's subsequent drop out of the console hardware business, none of the games announced as part of the deal were ever released on Jaguar.	Sega	Atari Corporation
Galactic Gladiators	Footage exists.	Photosurrealism	—N/a
Gates of Zendocon	Planned updated conversion of the Atari Lynx original. No actual development started on Jaguar version due to lack of interest.	Bethesda Softworks	Atari Corporation
Gotcha!	Unrelated to the 1973 video game of the same name. Currently under ownership of Creative Assembly director Jonathan Court.	The Dome Software Developments	Atari Corporation
Graham Gooch World Class Cricket	Development was halted due to the closure of Atari Corporation.	Williams Brothers Developments	Telegames
Gravon: Real Virtuality	Conversion of the Atari Falcon original.	Suma	—N/a
Green-Thang	Artwork conversion had barely started but coding was 80% finished and it is currently under ownership of Edgies CEO David Wightman. Nearly complete.	Creative Edge Software	Atari Corporation
Gunfight Max	50% complete. Development was halted due to technical issues.	Band In The Box Entertainment	—N/a
Gunship 2000	Unknown if full development on Jaguar version was started beyond rudimentary 3D modelling.	MicroProse	MicroProse
HardBall III		NuFX	Atari Corporation
HardBall IV		High Voltage Software	—N/a
Heart of Darkness	No actual development started on Jaguar CD version beyond proposition.	Amazing Studio	Virgin Interactive Entertainment
Highlander II: The Quest for Knowledge	Second title in the incomplete Highlander trilogy for Jaguar CD. Game design document and prototype exists. Also planned for PC.	Lore Design Limited	Atari Corporation
Highlander III: The Time of Endings	Third and last title in the incomplete Highlander trilogy for Jaguar CD. Game design document and prototype exists. Also planned for PC.	Lore Design Limited	Atari Corporation
Hosenose and Booger	Promotional artwork exists.	All Systems Go Technologies	Activision
Indiana Jags	A few graphics were created for the project.	Virtual Xperience	Virtual Xperience
Inferno		Digital Image Design	—N/a
Infinite Maze	Proposal document exists.	Bad Dog Software	—N/a
Iratan Supremacy	Artwork exists.	Level 7 Software	—N/a
Iron Man/X-O Manowar in Heavy Metal		Realtime Associates	Acclaim Entertainment
Ishar 3: The Seven Gates of Infinity	Conversion of the Atari Falcon version. 100% complete but left unpublished due to the closure of Atari Corporation.	Silmarils	Atari Corporation
Ishar 4: Ishar Genesis	Planned fourth entry in the Ishar series. First announced in 1995. Former Silmarils programmer stated ideas developed for it were later implemented into Asghan: The Dragon Slayer.	Silmarils	—N/a
Isle of the Dead	Conversion of the MS-DOS original.	Rainmaker Software	—N/a
Jack Nicklaus Cyber Golf	Various playable builds were leaked online. Game design document exists.	Hand Made Software	Atari Corporation
James Pond 3	Sub-contracted programmer and associated code of the conversion disappeared after development started.	Millennium Interactive	Telegames
Jimmy Connors Pro Tennis Tour		Ubi Soft	Atari Corporation
John Madden Football	data-sort-value="" style="background: var(--background-color-interactive, #ececec); color: var(--color-base, inherit); vertical-align: middle; text-align: center; " class="table-na" | —N/a	Electronic Arts	
Judge Dredd		Acclaim Entertainment	Acclaim Entertainment
Kasumi Ninja II	Game design document exists.	Hand Made Software	Atari Corporation
Kick Off 3	Showcased once in April 1994 running on development hardware. No prototype has surfaced.	Anco Software	Imagineer
Kid Vid Grid	100% complete. No prototype has surfaced.	High Voltage Software	Atari Corporation
Konan	Gameplay footage exists. No prototype has surfaced.	Arcade Zone	—N/a
Legions of the Undead	Also planned for PC and PlayStation. Artwork, models, prototypes and source code may still exist under ownership of Rebellion.	Rebellion Developments	Atari Corporation
Lester the Unlikely		DTMC	DTMC
Litil Divil		Gremlin Graphics	—N/a
Little Big Adventure	data-sort-value="" style="background: var(--background-color-interactive, #ececec); color: var(--color-base, inherit); vertical-align: middle; text-align: center; " class="table-na" | —N/a	Electronic Arts	
Livewire	Currently under ownership of original author Douglas Little.	Black Scorpion Software, Cortex Design	Atari Corporation
Lobo	Based upon the DC Comics character of the same name.	Ocean Software	—N/a
Lollapalooza: The Game	Based upon the music festival of the same name. Proposal document exists.	Pacific Gameworks	V-Real Interactive
Mad Dog McCree		American Laser Games	—N/a
Magic Carpet	Former Bullfrog programmer stated conversion was being developed in-house first before Atari Corp. bought the game's right in order to port it themselves.	Bullfrog Productions	Atari Corporation
Mechtiles	Updated conversion of the unreleased Atari Lynx original.	Beyond Games	—N/a
Mind Ripper	Based upon the HBO film of the same name by Wes Craven. Game design document exists.	Tiertex Design Studios	Atari Corporation
Miniature Golf		DTMC	DTMC
Mortal Kombat		Iguana Entertainment	Iguana Entertainment
Mortal Kombat 3	Advertized as 89% complete.	Williams Entertainment	Atari Corporation
Mountain Sports	Conversion of the also unreleased SNES version.	DTMC	DTMC
Nanoterror		Delta Music Systems Incorporation	—N/a
Navy Commando		Microïds	—N/a
The Need for Speed	No actual development started on Jaguar version due to the commercial and critical failure of the platform.	Electronic Arts	Electronic Arts
Nerf Max Force		Genus Microprogramming	Atari Corporation
Nerves of Steel	Conversion of the MS-DOS original.	Rainmaker Software	—N/a
Netherworld	data-sort-value="" style="background: var(--background-color-interactive, #ececec); color: var(--color-base, inherit); vertical-align: middle; text-align: center; " class="table-na" | —N/a	—N/a	
NeuroDancer: Journey Into the Neuronet!		PIXIS Interactive	—N/a
Nexus	Inspired by Raiden. 30% complete prior to cancellation.	Shen Technologies SARL	Atari Corporation
Nigel Mansell's World Championship Racing		Gremlin Graphics	Gremlin Graphics
Obsession	Nearly complete but scrapped by developers due to market reasons.	Unique Development Studios	—N/a
Off Road Rally	data-sort-value="" style="background: var(--background-color-interactive, #ececec); color: var(--color-base, inherit); vertical-align: middle; text-align: center; " class="table-na" | —N/a	Time Warner Interactive	
Omega Race	Proposal document exists.	Temporary Sanity Designs	—N/a
Oracle Octave	No prototype has surfaced.	Oracle Science International	—N/a
Orb Of Bengazi	Planned sequel to The Assassin. No actual development started beyond planning phase.	OMC Games	Hellified Games
OutRunners	In October 1993, Atari Corporation filed a lawsuit against Sega for an alleged infringement of a patent originally created by Atari Corp. in the 1980s, and Atari sought a preliminary injunction to stop manufacturing, usage, and sales of hardware and software for the Sega Genesis and Game Gear. On September 28, 1994, both parties reached a settlement involving a cross-licensing agreement to publish up to five games each year across their systems until 2001. A version of OutRunners was one of the first five games approved from the deal by Sega in order to be released on the Jaguar. However, with the Jaguar being discontinued in 1996, and Atari's subsequent drop out of the console hardware business, none of the games announced as part of the deal ever released on Jaguar.	Sega	Atari Corporation
Phantasy Star II	In October 1993, Atari Corporation filed a lawsuit against Sega for an alleged infringement of a patent originally created by Atari Corp. in the 1980s, and Atari sought a preliminary injunction to stop manufacturing, usage, and sales of hardware and software for the Sega Genesis and Game Gear. On September 28, 1994, both parties reached a settlement involving a cross-licensing agreement to publish up to five games each year across their systems until 2001. A version of Phantasy Star II was one of the first five games approved from the deal by Sega in order to be released on the Jaguar. However, with the Jaguar being discontinued in 1996, and Atari's subsequent drop out of the console hardware business, none of the games announced as part of the deal ever released on Jaguar.	Sega	Atari Corporation
Phase Zero	Cancelled due to Atari ending Jaguar support.	Hyper Image Productions	
Phear	Released on Nintendo 64 as Tetrisphere. No prototype has surfaced.	H2O Entertainment	Atari Corporation
Phong 2000		Phalanx Software	—N/a
Pong 2000	A 3D reimagining of the original 1972 arcade game.	Atari Corporation	Atari Corporation
Pong!	Freeware Pong clone. A ROM image was leaked online.	Retour 2048/Virtual Xperience	Virtual Xperience
PowerSlide		Elite Systems, Williams Brothers Developments	Telegames
Quake	Advertized as 30% complete.	id Software	—N/a
Return Fire		Alexandria	Prolific Publishing
Return of Magic	| data-sort-value="" style="background: var(--background-color-interactive, #ececec); color: var(--color-base, inherit); vertical-align: middle; text-align: center; " class="table-na" | —N/a	—N/a	
Return to Zork		Activision	Activision
Revolution X		Rage Software	—N/a
Rise of the Robots		Art Data Interactive, Williams Brothers Developments	Time Warner Interactive
Riven	No actual development started on Jaguar CD version| data-sort-value="" style="background: var(--background-color-interactive, #ececec); color: var(--color-base, inherit); vertical-align: middle; text-align: center; " class="table-na" | —N/a	Sunsoft	
Road Rash	No actual development started on Jaguar version due to the commercial and critical failure of the platform	Electronic Arts	Electronic Arts
RoboCop	Proposal document exists.	Ocean Software	—N/a
Robot Gladiators	data-sort-value="" style="background: var(--background-color-interactive, #ececec); color: var(--color-base, inherit); vertical-align: middle; text-align: center; " class="table-na" | —N/a	—N/a	
Robotron	Planned update of the original 1982 arcade game.| data-sort-value="" style="background: var(--background-color-interactive, #ececec); color: var(--color-base, inherit); vertical-align: middle; text-align: center; " class="table-na" | —N/a	Atari Corporation	
Rocky Interactive Horror Show	A non-playable demo was released by defunct Jaguar Sector II website under a CD-ROM compilation titled Jaguar Extremist Pack #1 in 2004. Released on PC.	Transylvania Interactive	Atari Corporation
Rollcage	No actual development started on Jaguar version.	Team17	—N/a
S.A.I. Corps	40% complete.	Band In The Box Entertainment	—N/a
Sam's Bowl-A-Rama	Proposal document exists.	Pacific Gameworks	V-Real Interactive
Sanscript Journey	Based upon the ancient Sanskrit language.	Atari Corporation	Atari Corporation
The Shadow	Based upon the 1994 film of the same name. Development on Jaguar CD version was scrapped in favor of Lobo.	Ocean Software	Ocean Software
Shinobi	In October 1993, Atari Corporation filed a lawsuit against Sega for an alleged infringement of a patent originally created by Atari Corp. in the 1980s, and Atari sought a preliminary injunction to stop manufacturing, usage, and sales of hardware and software for the Sega Genesis and Game Gear. On September 28, 1994, both parties reached a settlement involving a cross-licensing agreement to publish up to five games each year across their systems until 2001. A version of Shinobi was one of the first five games approved from the deal by Sega in order to be released on the Jaguar. However, with the Jaguar being discontinued in 1996, and Atari's subsequent drop out of the console hardware business, none of the games announced as part of the deal ever released on Jaguar.	Sega	Atari Corporation
Shock Wave	No actual development started on Jaguar version due to the commercial and critical failure of the platform.	Electronic Arts	Electronic Arts
Slam Racer	Early playable demo was included alongside the physical homebrew release of Painter for Jaguar CD. Development was halted due to lack of interest, monetary issues and closure of Atari Corp.	Sinister Developments	—N/a
Sokoban	data-sort-value="" style="background: var(--background-color-interactive, #ececec); color: var(--color-base, inherit); vertical-align: middle; text-align: center; " class="table-na" | —N/a	Atari Corporation	
Soulstar	A bootlet copy was sold off on eBay in 2004. Playthrough of a nearly complete build exists.	Core Design	Atari Corporation
SpaceGuy	Intended for used on kiddie rides with integrated Jaguar consoles as control units.	MP Games	Carousel International Corporation
Space Hulk	data-sort-value="" style="background: var(--background-color-interactive, #ececec); color: var(--color-base, inherit); vertical-align: middle; text-align: center; " class="table-na" | —N/a	—N/a	
Space Invaders	Intended for the unreleased Jaguar VR peripheral. Game design document exists.	Virtuality Entertainment	—N/a
Space Junk	Conversion of the unfinished Atari Falcon original.	Imagitec Design	Atari Corporation
Space Pirate	One of the first 14 titles to be greenlit for the Jaguar. First announced in 1993. Inspired by Metroid.	Atari Corporation	Atari Corporation
Starlight Bowl A-Rama		V-Real Interactive	—N/a
Starnet		Virtual Xperience	—N/a
Star Trek: The Next Generation		Spectrum HoloByte	Spectrum HoloByte
Star Trek: The Next Generation – A Final Unity		MicroProse	MicroProse
Steel Talons		Atari Corporation	Atari Corporation
Striker '95	Conversion of the MS-DOS original.	Rage Software	—N/a
Stunt Car Racer		MicroProse	—N/a
Sudden Impact		Creative Talents	Atari Corporation
Summer Games II		Teque London	Atari Corporation
Super Off Road	data-sort-value="" style="background: var(--background-color-interactive, #ececec); color: var(--color-base, inherit); vertical-align: middle; text-align: center; " class="table-na" | —N/a	Telegames	
Super Space Acer	Proposal document exists.	Moving Target Software Design	—N/a
Swagman		Core Design	—N/a
T-MEK		Time Warner Interactive	Atari Corporation
TFX		Digital Image Design	Ocean Software
Thea Realm Fighters		High Voltage Software	Atari Corporation
Thunderhawk		Core Design	—N/a
Thunderstalker		Telegames	Telegames
Tinhead	Conversion of the Sega Genesis original. No prototype has surfaced.	MicroProse UK	—N/a
Tiny Toon Adventures		Atari	—N/a
Tomb Raider		Core Design	—N/a
Top Fuel	Game design document proposal exists.	Tiertex Design Studios	—N/a
Turrican	Under discussion but no actual development started on Jaguar version.	Softgold Computerspiele GmbH	—N/a
Twin Crystals		Sinister Developments	—N/a
Ultimate Brain Games	A ROM image was leaked online in 2008 by former Teque London programmer.	Teque London	Telegames
Uncle Oswald's Invention	A few surviving pre-rendered graphics and animations were released by defunct Jaguar Sector II website under a CD-ROM compilation titled Jaguar Extremist Pack #3 in 2004.	Atari Corporation	Atari Corporation
Virtual VCS	An Atari 2600 emulator. A ROM image was released online in 2017 by video game collector Clint Thompson.	Temporary Sanity Designs	Atari Corporation
Virtuoso	Development was halted due to market issues.	Williams Brothers Developments	Telegames
Vortex		Argonaut Software	—N/a
Warlock	data-sort-value="" style="background: var(--background-color-interactive, #ececec); color: var(--color-base, inherit); vertical-align: middle; text-align: center; " class="table-na" | —N/a	Trimark Interactive	
Waterworld		Ocean Software	Ocean Software
Wayne Gretzky and the NHLPA All-Stars		Time Warner Interactive	Time Warner Interactive
Wild Cup Soccer	Development was halted due to market issues.	Telegames	Telegames
Wing Commander III: Heart of the Tiger	No actual development started on Jaguar CD version due to the commercial and critical failure of the platform.	Electronic Arts	Electronic Arts
Witchwood	Development on Jaguar version was halted due to marketing issues. Soundtrack was released by the original author in 1996.	Team17	Atari Corporation
Zaxxon 3-D	In October 1993, Atari Corporation filed a lawsuit against Sega for an alleged infringement of a patent originally created by Atari Corp. in the 1980s, and Atari sought a preliminary injunction to stop manufacturing, usage, and sales of hardware and software for the Sega Genesis and Game Gear. On September 28, 1994, both parties reached a settlement involving a cross-licensing agreement to publish up to five games each year across their systems until 2001. A version of Zaxxon 3-D was one of the first five games approved from the deal by Sega in order to be released on the Jaguar. However, with the Jaguar being discontinued in 1996, and Atari's subsequent drop out of the console hardware business, none of the games announced as part of the deal ever released on Jaguar.	Sega	Atari Corporation
Zodiac Fighters	Based upon the 12 signs of the Zodiac.	V-Real Interactive	Atari Corporation
Zone Hunter	Reworked conversion of the arcade original. Intended for the unreleased Jaguar VR peripheral. Game design document exists.	Virtuality Entertainment	Atari Corporation
ZOT	data-sort-value="" style="background: var(--background-color-interactive, #ececec); color: var(--color-base, inherit); vertical-align: middle; text-align: center; " class="table-na" | —N/a	—N/a	
Zzyorxx II		Virtual Xperience	—N/a

== See also ==
- List of Atari Jaguar games
- Lists of video games
