= Ultimate Brain Games (1995 video game) =

Unreleased board video game

- Preliminary cover art
- Developer: Teque London
- Publisher: Telegames
- Programmer: Greg Modern (uncredited)
- Platforms: Atari Jaguar; Atari Jaguar CD; PC
- Release: Unreleased
- Genre: Board game
- Modes: Single-player, multiplayer

Ultimate Brain Games is an unreleased board video game that was in development by Teque London and planned to be published by Telegames on a scheduled Q2 1995 release date exclusively for the Atari Jaguar. The game was going to be a spiritual successor to Fidelity Electronics and Telegames's 1991 Atari Lynx title The Fidelity Ultimate Chess Challenge. It was also intended to be released the Atari Jaguar CD add-on and later on the PC.

Featuring three different board games that heavily involves the use of thought, players compete against either computer-controlled or another human player in order to be the victor of the match. Ultimate Brain Games was first announced prior to the launch of the Jaguar in 1993, when Telegames became one of the first developers for it. It was listed, mentioned and previewed across several publications between 1994 and 1995, before it was eventually left unreleased due to the lack of success of the platform.

Despite Ultimate Brain Games never receiving an official release to the general public by Telegames, a ROM image of the game was leaked online in 2008 by a former Teque London employee, making it the only playable build of the title to be made available as of date.

== Gameplay ==
Gameplay screenshot from the leaked beta build.

Ultimate Brain Games is a board-style game where the players compete against either each other or a computer-controlled in order to be the winner of the match across three different thinking games that can be chosen at the main screen; Backgammon, Chess and Draughts, each one involving their own rulesets and stipulations, however only Chess and Draughts are selectable, as Backgammon is unplayable in the unfinished leaked build.

Prior to starting a match, players must choose a variety of setting such as order of turns and level of difficulty for the CPU opponent, in addition of being able to configurate the default control settings. Players can also choose between two different visual styles, one of which changes the pieces, board and scenery into a more cartoony-style.

When selecting Draughts, only the CPU plays the match from both sides in the leaked build, regardless of the option chosen.

== History ==
On September 24, 1993, Telegames was signed by Atari Corporation to be one of the first third-party developers for their then-upcoming Jaguar console and along with European Soccer Challenge, Ultimate Brain Games was one of the first titles to be officially announced for it. Ultimate Brain Games was then mentioned once more by online magazine Atari Explorer Online on their January 1994 issue, which detailed several of the features that were going to be included in the title at its launch. The game was later listed for the Jaguar across various video game magazines as early as March 1994, but it had no set release date for launch.

After Summer CES '94 and the release of the Jaguar conversion of Brutal Sports Football, which still mentioned the game as an upcoming title alongside European Soccer Challenge on its instruction manual, it was advertised to be released between December 1994 and 1995. Both Atari Explorer Online and print publications previewed the title in the next year, listing its several features and now planned for a Q1/Q2 1995 release, in addition of showcasing visuals that are different to those from early advertisements in the past year, as well as its preliminary cover art design. This preliminary box and magazine screenshots also revealed the logo of Teque London, indicating they were the main developers of the project.

However, internal documents from both Atari Corp. and Telegames revealed that development of the cartridge version was halted by Teque London at the request of the latter per order from Atari in order to develop a version for the Jaguar CD instead. The documents also revealed Telegame's plans of developing a PC version for revenue stream after completing the Jaguar CD port. Neither the Jaguar, Jaguar CD and PC version of Ultimate Brain Games were officially released to the general public, with both Terry Grantham and Pete Mortimer of Telegames stating years later the reasons why game went unreleased was due to Atari exiting from the home video game console market and low sales of their published titles that ultimately proved to be unprofitable, which prompted suspension of development of any upcoming title under their label.

== Release ==
In 2008, an early playable build of the Jaguar version of Ultimate Brain Games was leaked online by a former Teque London employee under the alias "CrazyAce" at the defunct Jaguar Sector II website for download.

== Legacy ==
In 2003, a game bearing the same name was developed by German developer Cosmigo and released by Telegames for both Game Boy Advance and PlayStation, featuring several board games not found in the unreleased Jaguar version.
