= Awesome Golf =

1991 video game

- Cover art in all regions
- Developer: Hand Made Software
- Publisher: Atari Corporation
- Producer: Juliana Wade
- Designer: Jim Gregory
- Programmers: Chris Manniex; Rob Nicholson
- Artist: Val Gregory
- Composers: Paul Tonge; Tony Williams
- Platform: Atari Lynx
- Release: NA: December 1991; EU: 1991
- Genre: Sports
- Modes: Single-player, multiplayer

Awesome Golf is a 1991 golf video game developed by Hand Made Software and published by Atari Corporation for the Atari Lynx. Players have the choice to compete either solo or against other human players using the console's ComLynx system on matches set in any of the three available countries across any of the game modes available. Its gameplay mainly uses a two-button configuration.

Awesome Golf was developed by most of the same staff that would later go on to work on future projects for Atari Corporation such as Kasumi Ninja on the Atari Jaguar. Atari had plans to develop a golf title for their Lynx platform and Hand Made Software travelled to meet with the company in order to work on a title for a handheld game console, which Atari agreed and decided to trust their golf project to the latter after being impressed with the team's abilities.

Awesome Golf was met with positive critical reception from video game magazines and dedicated outlets that reviewed the game since its launch, with reviewers praising several aspects such as the presentation, visuals, digitized voice samples, controls and gameplay, though some criticized other aspects of the title like the sound design. After its release, Hand Made Software would go on to develop five more titles for the Lynx.

== Gameplay ==
Gameplay screenshot

Awesome Golf is a golf game similar to Top Player's Golf and other golf titles from the era, where players compete in matches on various golf courses set across three countries of the world. There are three game modes and multiple golfers to choose from at the main menu: Medal is the main single-player mode where one player participates in 18 holes. Practice, as the name implies, is essentially a training mode where players can refine their skills. Lastly, there is Driving mode. Before starting each mode, players can configurate a set of options on the menu screen such as the number of holes to play through. Players also have the option of consulting with a gopher caddie called Chipper for advices and tips in how to complete a course before hitting the ball during gameplay. Multiplayer is a heavy focus of the game, as up to four players can compete with each other by connecting four Atari Lynx units via the system's ComLynx port.

== Production ==
=== Background ===
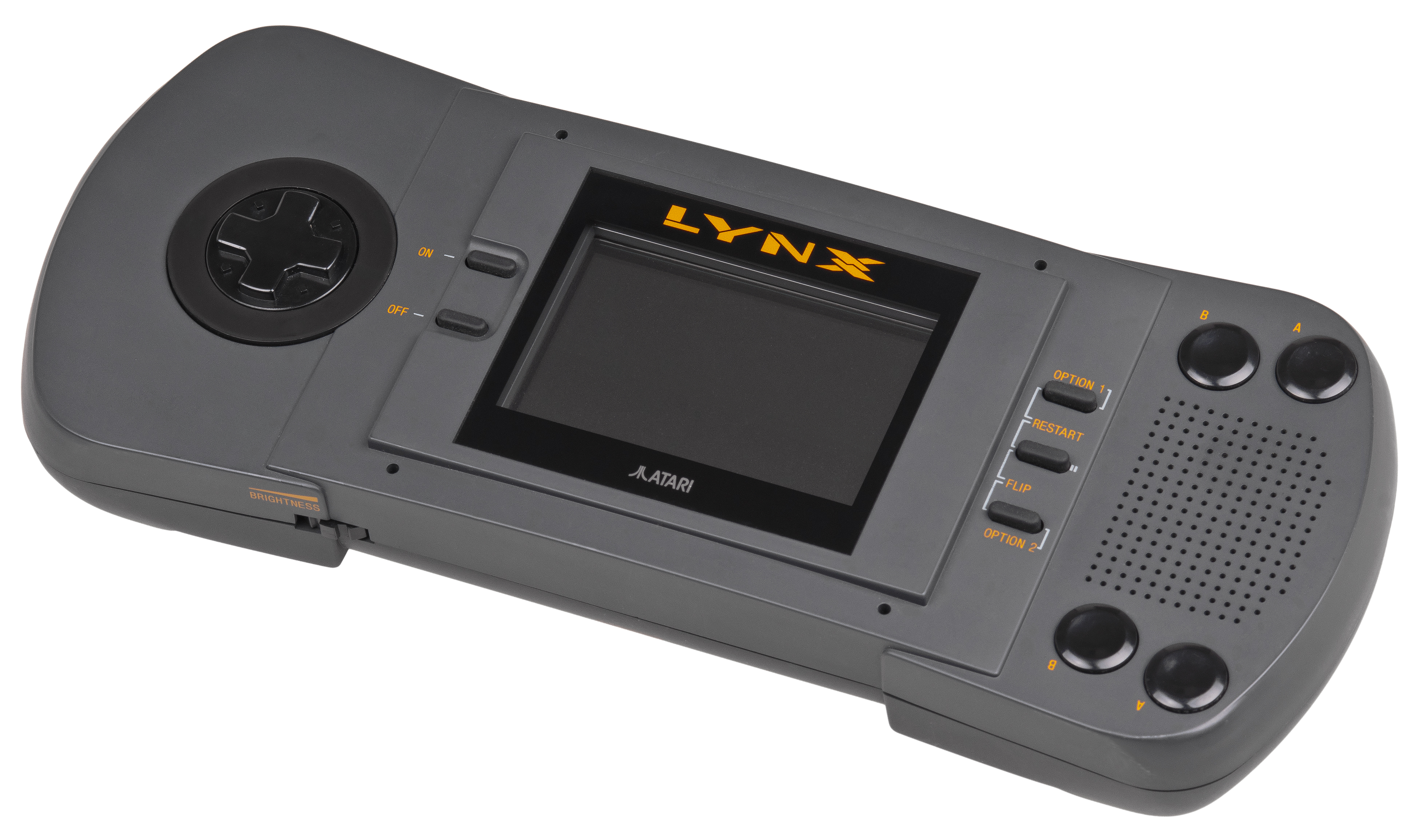
Awesome Golf was the first project to be created by Hand Made Software for the Atari Lynx.

Atari Corporation were already planning to release a four-player golf game for the Lynx as early as May 1990 under the title Masters Golf, however it did not have a concrete release date. Its original internal working title was Lynx Links, however Atari Corp. failed in registering said title, as the name "Lynx" was already in use at the time. Hand Made Software was a British studio founded in August 1990 by former Mr. Micro employees to focus on creating titles for handheld game consoles and recruited people with experience working in the video game industry, however the company had no project assigned to them but settled on working with the Atari Lynx. Two members of the company travelled to Chicago in order to meet with Atari to work on a Lynx project. Impressed with the team's abilities, Atari ultimately decided on trusting Hand Made Software with the development of a golf game that would later become Awesome Golf.

=== Development ===
Awesome Golf was made by most of the same team that would later work on various projects for Atari such as Kasumi Ninja on the Atari Jaguar. The development was helmed by a small team at Hand Made Software with Atari producer Juliana Wade leading its creation, while both Jim Gregory and Rob Nicholson served as the game's designers. Jim and Nicholson also shared roles as artists and programmers alongside Chris Manniex and Val Gregory. Both Paul Tonge and Tony Williams acted as composers for the title and created the sound effects as well, among other people collaborating in its development like David Gregory providing the voice work for Chipper. Jim Gregory and the team at Hand Made Software recounted the project's development process in a 1992 issue of British fanzine Lynx User, where they stated that Atari wanted a title which could appeal to audiences of all ages, as well as the controls "to be quick to learn" and realistic visuals instead of polygons as with other golf titles from the era.

The game was originally intended to feature only one area to play, however the team managed to generate courses with highly compact data structure, expanding the number of holes from 18 to 54 as a result. In addition, the team was aided by the University of Salford, who managed to provide materials necessary in order to accurately simulate the ball's flight and a total of three months of research, including consulting with golfers and video game players were spent into the project and after the mechanics were completed, the team focused on testing and adjusting the product. The team had difficulties implementing the ComLynx functionality into the project, as the game exhibited issues when Lynx systems were linked together, which led them on writing a custom code and routine to keep the consoles synchronized during multiplayer.

The team at Hand Made Software also had to develop a new zoom technique for the game as well, as the Lynx can only zoom into graphics of a certain size. During development, the cost for a 2 megabit cartridge was reduced, allowing the team to improve visuals and the inclusion of Chipper due to the increased memory size. The game went gold in November 1991 after passing through testing and debugging, with the team holding a wrap party to celebrate.

=== Release ===
Awesome Golf was published by Atari in North America and Europe in December 1991. Previews of the game featured different visuals compared with the final version released to the market, going under the name of Golf.

== Reception ==
Reception

Review scores
Publication	Score
AllGame	3/5
GamePro	19 / 25
IGN	9.0 / 10
Aktueller Software Markt	9 / 12
Consolemania	94 / 100
Consoles +	93%
The Electric Playground	7 / 10
Génération 4	95%
Go! Hand-Held Video Games	87 / 100
Hobby Consolas	83 / 100
Joypad	95%
Joystick	90%
Play Time	75%
Power Play	71%
Video Games	70%
VideoGames & Computer Entertainment	7 / 10

Awesome Golf was met with positive reception. Robert A. Jung reviewed the game which was later published on IGN in June 1999. In his final verdict he went on to say "This game captures the intricacies of the sport, while offering enough extras to enhance its appeal, though playing with friends can be a hassle. If golf is your game, Awesome Golf should not be missed." Giving a final rating of 9 out of 10.

== Legacy ==
After the release of Awesome Golf, Hand Made Software worked on five more projects for the Lynx: Dracula the Undead (an adventure game loosely based on Bram Stoker's Dracula novel), Power Factor (a conversion of an unreleased Atari ST project by Red Rat Software titled Red Ace), Malibu Bikini Volleyball, Jimmy Connors' Tennis (a port of NMS Software's tennis game featuring Jimmy Connors), and Battlezone 2000.
