= Dirty Larry: Renegade Cop =

1992 video game

- Cover art by Erik Olson
- Developer: Knight Technologies
- Publisher: Atari Corporation
- Director: John Smedley
- Producer: John Skruch
- Programmer: Thomas Schenck
- Artists: Ken Cashmoor; Michael Hugo
- Composer: Thomas Schenck
- Platform: Atari Lynx
- Release: NA: November 1992; EU: 1992
- Genre: Beat 'em up
- Mode: Single-player

Dirty Larry: Renegade Cop is a 1992 beat 'em up video game developed by Knight Technologies and published by Atari Corporation in North America and Europe exclusively for the Atari Lynx. Set in the city of Steelburg, players assume the role of the titular police officer to fight back against criminals on the streets and arrest the head of the organized crime of the city known only as Mr. Big. Its gameplay mainly consists of hand-to-hand or weapon combats with a main two-button configuration.

Dirty Larry: Renegade Cop has been met with mixed critical reception since its release. While the visuals were unanimously praised, critics and reviewers alike felt divided in regards to the audio, length and repetitive gameplay.

== Gameplay ==
Gameplay screenshot.

Dirty Larry: Renegade Cop is a side-scrolling beat 'em up game where players take control of Larry, who tasks upon himself on fighting the criminals that roams the streets of Steelburg through seven stages in order to find and arrest Mr. Big, the head of the organized crime in the city and the game's final boss, as the main objective. Players move through each level beating up enemies and picking weapons left on streets, as Larry carries a limited amount of ammunition at the beginning of the game and the current weapon in use will be left unusable unless more ammo is found. Players can also pick up health items left by enemies when beaten. Each stage hosts a boss that must be fought before progressing any further, requiring different strategies to defeat them and after doing so, Larry uses a metro line to travel other locations, acting as a transition point between stages.

== Development and release ==
Dirty Larry: Renegade Cop was announced to be in development by Knight Technologies in mid-1991 and planned to be released later in the year, however the game faced several delays and was later first showcased to the attendees at Consumer Electronics Show in 1992 before launch. In a January 1992 interview with online magazine Atari Explorer Online, Thomas Schenck recounted about the development process of the game. Schenck stated that he was the sole programmer of the project and it was originally intended to be similar to Electrocop, in which the players moved forwards or backwards but due to framerate issues, the original concept was scrapped and reworked into a side-scrolling title. He also stated that two levels were also cut from the final product, with one due to cartridge space constraints and another for not fitting into the plot. The cover art was illustrated by Erik Olson.

== Reception ==
Reception

Review scores
Publication	Score
Electronic Gaming Monthly	24 / 40
GamePro	16.5 / 20
IGN	5.0 / 10
Consolemania	69 / 100
Consoles +	50%
GamesMaster	76%
Joypad	52%
Lynx User	7 / 10
Mega Fun	43%
Player One	56%
VideoGames & Computer Entertainment	7 / 10

Robert Jung reviewed the game which was published to IGN. In his final verdict he went on to say that "Conceptually, Dirty Larry had the ingredients to be a easy, no-nonsense action title. Unfortunately, the game balance got thrown out of sync, and the final result lies in video limbo: young players will be turned off by the difficulty of the game, and experienced gamers will finish it too quickly." Jung also noted "That's Larry, not Harry" this is probably a reference to the Dirty Harry movies. He then gave the game a low score of 5 out of 10.
