= Bubble Trouble =

Bubble Trouble may refer to:

- Bubble Trouble (film), a 1953 film
- Bubble Trouble (1987 video game), a 1987 video game for the Atari ST
- Bubble Trouble (1994 video game), a 1994 video game for the Atari Lynx
- Bubble Trouble: Golly! Ghost! 2, a 1992 arcade game
- Bubble Trouble (1996 video game), a 1996 video game for Mac
- Bubble Trouble, book by Margaret Mahy, illustrated by Polly Dunbar
