= Planet Blupi =

1997 video game

- Developer: Epistec
- Publishers: Epistec, Telegames
- Platform: Microsoft Windows
- Release: 1997
- Genre: Strategy
- Mode: Single-player

Planet Blupi is a 1997 real-time strategy video game developed and published by Epsitec and published in the United States by Telegames for Microsoft Windows. Upon release, the game received mixed reviews, with critics finding the game simplistic and childish, but that it was an appropriate introduction to the strategy genre for younger or first-time players.

== Gameplay ==
Gameplay screenshot

After a spaceship disguised as a meteorite lands on the planet of the Blupi, strange events occur as an evil robot takes over the entire planet with his machines. The game is a real-time strategy game set over 30 missions. Players use point and click controls to issue commands to the Blupi to gather resources such as wood, stone, and ore, construct buildings using those resources, and build weapons and vehicles to fight the robots. The game features additional mission objectives, including to secure camps, rescue captured Blupis, and protect from hazards including forest fires. Planet Blupi contains a level editor allowing players to craft their own maps and mission objectives.

== Development ==
Planet Blupi was created by Swiss development studio Epistec System SA, a company founded in 1978 to sell the Smaky (Smart Keyboard). It is part of a series conceived by Daniel Roux and developed by Epistec that included the 1993 title Blupi Explorer and 1994 Blupimania. The game was distributed in the United States by Telegames. In 2016, Epistec colleague Mathieu Schroeter created a reimplementation of the game on the Blupi website.

== Reviews ==
Reception

Review scores
Publication	Score
CD-Action	6/10
PC Player	30%
Wisconsin State Journal	4/5

Scott Udell of Computer Games Strategy Plus considered that Planet Blupi was a "great way" to introduce younger players to real-time strategy games, although felt the title would be too simplistic and "kiddy-oriented" for adult players. Similarly, CD-Action considered the game "enjoyable and quite well-made", but that it was childish due to its lack of violence and fairy-tale graphics, assessing its simplicity was most appropriate to children and newcomers to the real-time strategy genre. Joystick stated the game was "much more accessible" than its counterparts due to the lack of options. PC Player enjoyed the "varied missions" and inclusion of an editor, but did not find the game's concept and its "cuddly environment" appealing.
