= World Class Fussball/Soccer =

1992 video game

- Cover art in all regions
- Developers: Brian A. Rice, Inc.
- Publisher: Atari Corporation
- Designers: Brian A. Rice; Ted R. Niemiec; W. B. Norris IV
- Programmer: Rob McCool
- Artists: Glenn Leszczak; Joel Seider; Rick Incrocci
- Composers: Clifford Falls; Chuck Batson
- Platform: Atari Lynx
- Release: NA: 1992; EU: 1992
- Genre: Sports
- Modes: Single-player, multiplayer

World Class Fussball/Soccer (Note: Also known as World Class Soccer at the splash screen.) is a football video game developed by Brian A. Rice Inc. and published by Atari Corporation for the Atari Lynx in 1992.

== Gameplay ==
Gameplay screenshot.

In World Class Fussball/Soccer, there are 131 different countries to play with and against. The premise of the game is that players have made it to the "World Class Finals" and are facing against the defending World Champions.

Players are able to set the length of the match anywhere from 10 to 90 minutes. They are equally able to set the field conditions, such as whether the field is dry or muddy, and the computer's skill level.

The gameplay takes the structure of a regular soccer game, with features like throw-ins, corner kicks, and fouls.

There is the option to tackle, either from the side or by kicking. The game offers full control of the goalie, and all squad members. However, the game automatically switches to the player who controls the ball.

== Reception ==
Reception

Review scores
| Publication | Score |
|---|---|
| AllGame | 1.5/5 |
| IGN | 5.0 / 10 |
| Consolemania | 70 / 100 |
| Joypad | 82% |
| Joystick | 88% |
| Power Play | 35% |
| Player One | 51% |
| Video Games | 38% |
| Zero | 50 / 100 |

Robert A Jung reviewed the game which was published to IGN, in his final verdict he wrote "This game has the ingredients for a quality soccer game, but assembles them into a disappointing ensemble that could have been better." Giving a score of 5 out of 10.

Kyle Knight of AllGame Guide gave the game one and a half out of five stars. He criticized the game’s "incredibly skittish camera and awkward viewpoint," ending by saying it was "a frustrating experience that only the most ardent of soccer fans could enjoy."
