= Urban Yeti! =

2002 video game

- Developer: Cave + Barn Studios
- Publisher: Telegames
- Platform: Game Boy Advance
- Release: NA: August 16, 2002
- Genre: Action
- Mode: Single-player

Urban Yeti! is an action video game developed by Cave + Barn Studios and published by Telegames for the Game Boy Advance. It was released in North America on August 16, 2002.

== Gameplay ==
The yeti battles with a police officer on a street.

The plot of Urban Yeti! focuses on a yeti's quest to find a yeti mate in a large city populated with humans. The game plays from a top-down perspective similar to the early Grand Theft Auto games. The player must make their way through the city in order to come across missions, which take the form of separate minigames, such as when the yeti must get a job in order to earn the money to pay a toll to cross a bridge.

As the yeti walks around the city, he is attacked by townspeople and must try to avoid being killed. The game features four minigames and four missions to complete. Once minigames are completed, the player is unable to go back and play them again unless they type in the password for the section of the game they are in.

== Development ==
Urban Yeti! was published by Telegames and developed by UK developer Cave Barn Studios.

== Reception ==
Reception

Aggregate scores
Aggregator	Score
GameRankings	68.71%
Metacritic	67%

Review score
Publication	Score
IGN	7/10

Urban Yeti! received mixed reviews from critics, who praised the game's humor but criticized its technical problems. It received a 67% and a 68.71% from review aggregate websites Metacritic and GameRankings respectively.

IGN's Craig Harris criticized the game's slow frame rate and technical problems, saying that the game was produced by a "few guys down in someone's basement" instead of some established development studio. Allgame's Brett Alan Weiss noted that the game had charming moments, but ultimately had little replay value and had too many graphical problems. GameZone's Scott Kuvin felt that the collision detection of the game had some glitches, but felt that the game's humor overcame any technical problems.
