= Kung Food =

1992 video game

- Developer: Lore Games
- Publisher: Atari Corporation
- Programmers: Christian Urquhart; Steven A. Mitchell
- Composer: Tim Harper
- Platform: Atari Lynx
- Release: 1992
- Genre: Beat 'em up
- Mode: Single-player

Kung Food is a 1992 beat-em-up video game developed by Lore Games and published by Atari Corporation for Atari Lynx. The player controls a protagonist who uses martial arts to overcome mutant vegetables that have invaded his freezer.

== Gameplay ==
Gameplay screenshot

== Plot ==
The main character is a researcher at a top secret ODnet videogames center, the experiments conducted create Rynoleum, "A compound that deforms all life it contacts." the protagonist discovers that ODnet plans to use Rynoleum in their latest videogame, risking millions of lives. the protagonist decides that their plans need to be stopped. The main character takes the samples of Rynoleum and brings it to their house, the compound is only stable when frozen so the protagonist stores it in his kitchen freezer. Later at night the main character hears strange noises coming from the kitchen, when they go to investigate they discover that their freezer has been left open and the temperature has risen. The protagonist attempts to shut the freezer to stop the Rynoleum from becoming unstable, but is instead transformed by the Rynoleum. The main character must now fight the monsters created by the Rynoleum spreading. The protagonist travels throughout his kitchen now shrunken, going through the freezer, fridge, floor, counter, window planter box, and finally the outside. After defeating the last enemy, the main character uses a sprinkler to wash the Rynoleum off and is returned back to his original state.

== Development and release ==
Kung Food was developed by the UK-based Lore Games, which was initially founded to create the play-by-mail game Lore Lords of Britain. Designer Steven Mitchell worked on the BBC Micro ports of 007: Licence to Kill and Star Wars: Return of the Jedi for Domark while in college. Kung Food would be the first video game Lore Games worked on after Atari sent them a Lynx development kit. Mitchell was joined by fellow coder Christian Urquhart, artist Paul Johnson, and composer Tim Harper. According to Urquhart, the team was under pressure from Atari to produce the game for the fairly new handheld. Recalling the production of Kung Food, he remarked, "Getting multiplayer to work was the most challenging, but a lot of fun at the same time."

== Reception ==
Reception

Review scores
Publication	Score
AllGame	2/5
Electronic Gaming Monthly	23/40
GameFan	90%
GamePro	13/20
IGN	6.0/10
Aktueller Software Markt	3/12
Consoles +	40%
GamesMaster	72%
HonestGamers	1.5/5
Joypad	90%
Joystick	64%
Power Play	59%
Video Games	58%
VideoGames & Computer Entertainment	7/10
Zero	81/100

On July 7, 1999, Robert A. Jung reviewed Kung Food for IGN in his final verdict he wrote "Take away the story, and Kung Food comes across as a very average fighting game that breaks no new ground. The game's controls and minor quirks may irritate some players, but fight fans with Lynxes should look past the silliness and give the title a try." Rating the game 6 out of 10. In 2011, Winston Wolf reviewed the game for HonestGamers, giving it a rating of 3 out of 10.
