= Krazy Ace Miniature Golf =

1993 video game

- Cover art in all regions
- Developer: Telegames
- Publisher: Telegames
- Platform: Atari Lynx
- Release: NA: 1993; EU: 1993
- Genre: Sports
- Modes: Single-player, multiplayer

Krazy Ace Miniature Golf is a 1993 miniature golf video game developed and published by Telegames in North America and Europe exclusively for the Atari Lynx.

== Gameplay ==
Gameplay screenshot

The player starts by putting in the name and selecting a color and is then thrown into a miniature golf course. When hitting the mini-golf ball it moves around the little course until it gets into a hole. Several stage/course obstacles include giant cactuses and a little pond are in the way.

== Development and release ==
Krazy Ace was programmed in 1991 but not released until late 1993 by Telegames. The game was released in very small quantities and as of a result of this, the game has become very sought after by collectors and gamers alike. A complete copy today is worth around $450, making it one of the most expensive Atari Lynx titles ever officially released.

== Reception ==
Reception

Review scores
Publication	Score
AllGame	1/5
IGN	6.0 / 10
Atari Gaming Headquarters	1 / 10

Robert Jung reviewed the game which was published to IGN. In his final verdict he wrote "Krazy Ace Miniature Golf is a good miniature golf game, but not a great one; the card's major flaw is the lack of variety in the course and the game itself. With merely passable graphics and sound, this is a decent game to divert yourself for a little while, but there's almost nothing here to keep you on this krazy kourse for the long term." Giving a final score of 6 out of 10.
