= Championship Rally (2000 video game) =

2000 video game

- Original cover art
- Developer(s): Songbird Productions
- Publisher(s): Songbird Productions
- Programmer(s): Lucien Kleijkers
- Artist(s): Carl Forhan; Lucien Kleijkers
- Composer(s): Carl Forhan
- Platform(s): Atari Lynx
- Release: WW: 15 December 2000
- Genre(s): Racing
- Mode(s): Single-player, multiplayer

Championship Rally is a homebrew racing video game developed and published by Songbird Productions exclusively for the Atari Lynx on December 15, 2000. Themed around rallying, the players compete with either AI-controlled opponents or against other players in matches across various locations.

Championship Rally served as the second title to be released by Songbird Productions for the Atari Lynx after Ponx. The game has been met with mixed reception from reviewers since its initial release, who felt divided in regards to several aspects such as the presentation, visuals, audio, controls and gameplay. As of 2019, the title has sold over 300 copies in total.

== Gameplay ==
Gameplay screenshot

Championship Rally is a top-down rally racing game where players observe from above and races across multiple tracks. There are a total of seven courses to race along, with four of them being locked at the beginning and four modes of play: Tournament, Single Race, Time Trial and Versus. Game saves are handled manually via password. In the single-player tournament mode, players have to compete in a racing season across tracks filled with obstacles on multiple regions such as Alaska, each one consisting of three-laps, while racing against CPU-controlled opponents. Single Race is an arcade-style mode where the player can choose between any of the tracks to refine their skills. Time Trial, as the name implies, is a mode where players compete against the clock in an attempt to obtain the best time possible. Multiplayer is a heavy focus of the game, as four players can compete against each other in head-to-head races on Versus mode by connecting four Lynx units via the system's ComLynx port.

== Development and release ==
Championship Rally served as the second homebrew game to be developed and published by Songbird Productions for the Atari Lynx after their first title, Ponx. Lucien Kleijkers served as the game's only programmer, while Songbird Productions founder Carl Forhan was also involved during development of the project with sound design. The title was launched on December 15, 2000, after Hasbro Interactive released the rights for the Lynx into public domain. In May 2001, a second print run was launched.

== Reception ==
Reception

Review scores
Publication	Score
IGN	6.0 / 10
Atari Gaming Headquarters	7 / 10
The Atari Times	80%
Pocket Magazine	4/5

Championship Rally was met with mixed reception from critics and reviewers alike since its initial release. Keita Iida of Atari Gaming Headquarters praised the controls, presentation and audio design but criticized the lack of support for additional players in versus races. Iida gave the game a 7 out of 10 score, regarding it as "a worthy effort by two individuals who weren't paid thousands of up-front dollars like Lynx developers of the early 90s". IGN's Marc Nix regarded the gameplay to be enjoyable and the ability to customize vehicles but criticized the lack of additional tracks, graphical variety on said tracks and lack of support for more players in multiplayer. Nix gave the title a 6.0 out of 10 rating. Bruce Clarke of gaming website The Atari Times gave positive comments in regards to its presentation, controls, visuals and audio, obtaining an 80% score.

Championship Rally has sold over an estimated 300 copies as of 2019, according to Songbird Productions' Carl Forhan.
