= Hockey (1992 video game) =

- Cover art in all regions by Marc W. Ericksen
- Developer: Alpine Software
- Publisher: Atari Corporation
- Producer: Ed Ringler Jr.
- Designer: Ed Ringler Jr.
- Programmer: Simon Ffinch
- Artist: Ed Ringler Sr.
- Composer: Alex Rudis
- Platform: Atari Lynx
- Release: NA: 1992; EU: 1992
- Genre: Sports
- Modes: Single-player, multiplayer

Hockey is an ice hockey video game for the Atari Lynx, developed by American studio Alpine Software and published by Atari Corporation.

== Gameplay ==
It is a fast paced hockey game. It has a standard, fight only, and practice shootout mode. It has many ways to modify things in-game, including the teams themselves. there are 22 teams and the ability to activate pro rules or fights.

Gameplay screenshot.

== Reception ==
Reception

Review scores
Publication	Score
GamePro	12.5 / 20
IGN	7.0 / 10
Consolemania	88 / 100
Consoles +	86%
Génération 4	90%
Joypad	92%
Joystick	90%
Micromanía	46 / 60
Power Play	65%
ST Format	82%
Video Games	68%
VideoGames & Computer Entertainment	7 / 10

Hockey was met with mostly positive reception. Robert Jung reviewed the game which has been published on IGN gave Hockey a score of 7 out of 10.
