= Turbo Sub =

1985 video game

- Arcade flyer by Jeff Conly
- Developer: Entertainment Sciences (Note: Ported to Atari Lynx by NuFX)
- Publishers: Entertainment Sciences; Atari Corporation (Lynx)
- Designer: Dick Keenan
- Programmers: Dick Keenan; Steve Tatsumi; David Fox
- Artist: Lars-Arne Hult
- Composers: Gary Hubatka; Suren Yegiyants
- Platforms: Arcade, Atari Lynx
- Release: Arcade: NA: 1985; Lynx: NA: 1991; EU: 1991
- Genre: Shooter
- Modes: Single-player, multiplayer (Only on Atari Lynx)
- Arcade system: RIP System (Note: Short for Real-Time Image Processor System.)

Turbo Sub is a first-person shoot 'em up released in arcades by Entertainment Sciences in 1985. Aliens have attacked the planet and the player fights them beneath the ocean using a submersible ship. Six years after the arcade original, Atari Corporation published a Lynx version, which adds a two-player mode.

== Gameplay ==
Arcade version screenshot

== Development ==
Entertainment Sciences created Bouncer and then Turbo Sub before folding. According to a promotional flyer, Turbo Sub contains over 400 images.

== Release ==
A version for the Lynx was developed by NuFX and published by Atari Corporation in 1991. The manual clarifies the alien conflict as taking place on Earth in the 28th century.

== Reception ==
In 1986, Computer & Video Games magazine called Turbo Sub, "One of the most bizarre trips you're likely to make". The reviewer praised how the experience is automatically adjusted based on the player's skill, so the game plays differently over time.

In a contemporaneous review for the Lynx version, Robert A. Jung concluded, "What Turbo Sub lacks in originality and variety, it makes up with blistering excitement. If you've got an appetite for simple, uncomplicated massive destruction at Mach 3, Turbo Sub is the way to go." He gave a score of 7.5 out of 10. In the "Atari Attack" column in the final issue of Raze magazine, Turbo Sub received a score of 73%.
