= Ultimate Card Games =

2004 video game

- Game Boy Advance box art
- Developer: Cosmigo
- Publisher: Telegames
- Platforms: Game Boy Advance, Nintendo DS
- Release: 2004: Game Boy Advance; NA: May 25, 2004; PAL: May 25, 2004 Nintendo DS; NA: November 8, 2011
- Genre: Cards
- Modes: Single-player, multiplayer

Ultimate Card Games is a 2004 video game developed by German studio Cosmigo and published by Telegames for the Game Boy Advance and Nintendo DS platforms. It contains several thinking games, such as poker and solitaire. Ultimate Card Games for the Nintendo DS was initially scheduled for release in spring of 2005. After numerous delays, an October 2007 press release from Nintendo placed the game's release in March 2008, but the game was not shipped to retailers. Ultimate Card Games DS was released only in North America on November 8, 2011.

== Games ==
It includes the following card games:

- Hearts
- Spades
- Bridge
- Euchre
- Cribbage
- Canasta
- Gin Rummy
- Go Fish
- Crazy Eights
- Five Card Stud Poker
- Blackjack

== See also ==
- Ultimate Brain Games

== Reception ==
Craig Harris of IGN gave the game a 9.5/10 score, praising its large amount of content, in particular the number of gameplay variations and extra content, as well as its presentation and surprisingly high quality. He considered the Game Boy Advance version to be the 13th best game on the console.
