= Lynx Casino =

1992 video game

- Developers: Brian A. Rice, Inc.
- Publisher: Atari Corporation
- Producer: Craig Erickson
- Designers: Brian A. Rice; Mark D. Waterman
- Programmer: Perry Horwich
- Artists: Robb Mariani; Tom Brophy
- Composers: Clifford Falls; Chuck Batson
- Platform: Atari Lynx
- Release: NA: June 1992; EU: 1992
- Genre: Casino
- Modes: Single-player, multiplayer

Lynx Casino is a 1992 gambling simulator for the Atari Lynx developed by Brian A. Rice Inc. It includes blackjack, craps, roulette, slot machines and video poker.

== Gameplay ==
Gameplay screenshot

== Reception ==
Reception

Review scores
Publication	Score
Electronic Gaming Monthly	7/10
GamePro	15 / 20
IGN	7.0/10
Aktueller Software Markt	9/12
Consoles +	64%
Génération 4	88%
Joypad	75%
Joystick	70%
ST Format	20%
Video Games	46%
VideoGames & Computer Entertainment	7 / 10

The four reviewers of Electronic Gaming Monthly regarded Lynx Casino as one of the best gambling simulators available, citing the large selection of games, the easy-to-read display despite the small screen size and the clever Easter eggs planted throughout the game. They gave it a seven out of ten. Robert A. Jung at IGN gave the game seven out of ten in a 1999 retrospective review.
