= Malibu Bikini Volleyball =

1993 video game

- Cover in all regions featuring model Karen Isely
- Developer: Hand Made Software
- Publisher: Atari Corporation
- Producers: James Hampton; Oscar Green
- Designers: Jim Gregory; Val Gregory
- Programmers: Bill Barna; Rob Nicholson
- Artists: Andy Gavin; Lee Cawley; Michael McCallion
- Composer: Paul Tonge
- Platform: Atari Lynx
- Release: NA: June 1993; EU: 1993
- Genre: Sports
- Modes: Single-player, multiplayer

Malibu Bikini Volleyball is a 1993 beach volleyball video game developed by Hand Made Software and published by Atari Corporation for the Atari Lynx. In the game, players have the choice to compete across any of the game modes available with either AI-controlled opponents or against other human players using the Lynx's ComLynx system on matches set in Malibu, California. Its gameplay mainly uses a two-button configuration.

Malibu Bikini Volleyball formed part in a string of projects created by Hand Made Software on the Lynx after their first title for the platform, Awesome Golf, went gold and released to the public in 1991. Its development was led by Alien vs Predator producer James Hampton along with Oscar Green of Hand Made and went through various changes before its eventual launch to the market.

Malibu Bikini Volleyball garnered mixed reception from critics since its release, who felt divided in regards to several aspects such as the presentation, graphics, sound design, gameplay and controls, although the multiplayer for up to four people was noted by some reviewers as a positive point.

== Gameplay ==
Gameplay screenshot.

Malibu Bikini Volleyball is a two-on-two beach volleyball game similar to Kings of the Beach and RealSports Volleyball, where players take control of either a male or a female avatar in a series of matches on outdoor courts taking place in Malibu, California. Most of the rules from the sport are present in the title, though they can be modified in the options menu along with other settings that alters the matches. Some of the gameplay options found within the game include a friendly mode where players can practice their skills and a tournament mode where multiple teams must be faced in order to become the emerging champion. Multiplayer is one of the main focus of the game, as up to four players can compete against each other by connecting four Atari Lynx units via the system's ComLynx port during the title screen. During gameplay, players are able to apply skills such as serve, pass, set, attack and block the incoming ball for offensive and defensive purposes respectively in order to score points. A noteworthy feature is the ability to change the in-game music by pressing the Option 2 button during gameplay to do so.

== Development and release ==
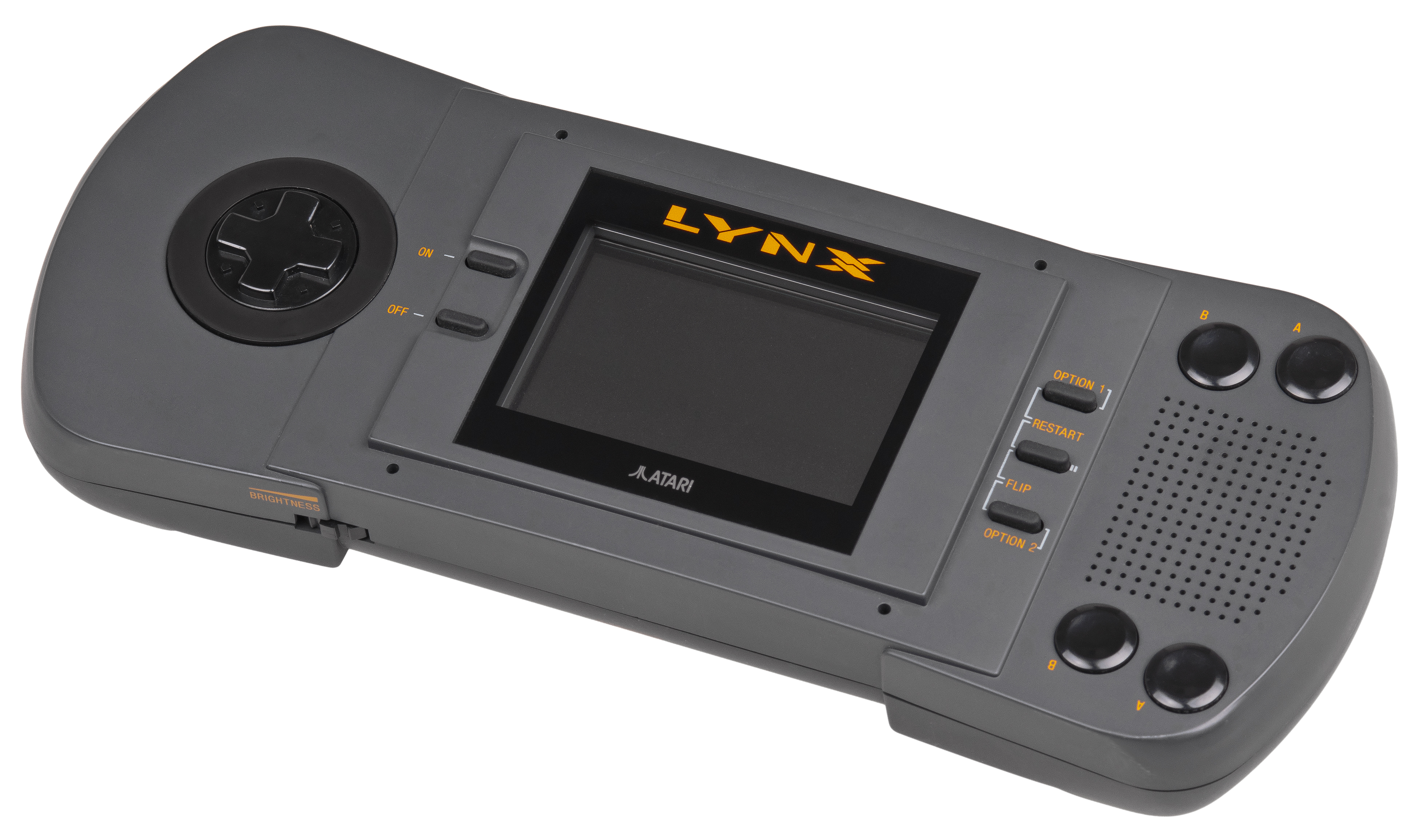
Malibu Bikini Volleyball was one of the several projects under development by Hand Made Software for the Lynx.

Malibu Bikini Volleyball formed part in a string of five projects by Hand Made Software for Atari Corporation after their first commercially released game on the Lynx, Awesome Golf, went gold. Its development was helmed by a small team at the company with Oscar Green as producer, while James Hampton was also a producer of the project prior to his role with Alien vs Predator on the Atari Jaguar, although he is not credited as such in the credits of the game. Both Jim and Val Gregory served as co-designers, while Bill Barna and Rob Nicholson acted as programmers. Artists Andy Gavin, Lee Cawley and Michael McCallion were responsible for the pixel art. Both the music and sound effects were created by Paul Tonge while Carrie Tahquechi, wife of ex-Atari producer Ted Tahquechi and the female voice in Tempest 2000, did voice work for the title.

Malibu Bikini Volleyball was announced for a Q2 1992 release early in the same year and went through various visual and name changes before release, in addition of delays. Early previews showcased the game under the title Bikini Beach Volleyball, featuring a different title screen compared with the final version featuring model Karen Isely, while the game was later slated for a September 1992 release during summer but it was renamed to Malibu Beach Volleyball before settling under its initial name. Other previews of the game also touted multiplayer support for up to two players instead of four. It was first showcased in a playable state to attendees at Consumer Electronics Show in 1992. The title was eventually released in 1993, late into the life span of the Lynx.

== Reception ==
Reception

Review scores
Publication	Score
AllGame	2/5
Electronic Gaming Monthly	6/10, 5/10, 4/10, 4/10, 5/10
IGN	7.0/10
The Atari Times	85%
Digital Press	4/10

Robert Jung reviewed the game which was published on IGN in his verdict he wrote "Malibu Bikini Volleyball is not a very demanding game, but is, like a good day at the beach, a leisurely way to spend some time. Gamers looking for a more punishing regiment should look elsewhere, but those who want a kinder, gentler sport will find this title pleasing." Giving a final score of 7 out of 10.
