= Ultimate Brain Games =

2003 video game

- North American Game Boy Advance box art
- Developer: Cosmigo
- Publisher: Telegames
- Platforms: Game Boy Advance, PlayStation
- Release: Game Boy Advance: NA: March 18, 2003; PAL: March 28, 2003; PlayStation: NA: December 2, 2003
- Genre: Puzzle
- Modes: Single-player, multiplayer

Ultimate Brain Games is a 2003 puzzle video game developed by Cosmigo and published by Telegames for the Game Boy Advance and PlayStation. It contains several thinking games, such as chess and checkers.

== Games ==
It features eight different games:

- Chess
- Checkers
- Backgammon
- Dominoes
- Reversi
- Sink Ships (Battleship)
- Four-in-a-row (Connect Four)
- Shanghai (Mahjong solitaire)

== Reception ==
The Game Boy Advance version was nominated for IGN's strategy game of the year; IGN described the game "a great assortment of little games", giving it a rating of 8.5/10.

== See also ==
- Ultimate Card Games
