= Power Factor (video game) =

1993 video game

- Cover in all regions
- Developer: Hand Made Software
- Publisher: Atari Corporation
- Producer: Juliana Wade
- Designers: Barry Armstrong; Jim Gregory
- Programmers: Chris Manniex; John May; Rob Nicholson
- Artists: Lee Cawley; Michael McCallion
- Composer: Paul Tonge
- Platform: Atari Lynx
- Release: NA: February 1993; EU: 1993
- Genres: Action, platform
- Mode: Single-player

Power Factor is a 1993 action-platform video game developed by Hand Made Software and published by Atari Corporation for the Atari Lynx. Based around a video game within a video game concept, players take control of a character who is in turn playing on a virtual reality simulator assuming the role of Redd Ace, which is recreating his battle against the Sinlendo Techmods by recovering necessary bomb components to defeat the alien race at the Ceegraian Power Station. Its gameplay consists of platforming, exploration and weapons-based combat with a main four-button configuration.

Power Factor originally began as a project intended for the Atari ST that was in development by Red Rat Software under the title Red Ace, which was nearly completed before being left unpublished due to internal issues at the company and its eventual disbandment prior to release, however Hand Made Software would later develop a conversion to the Lynx.

Power Factor has been met with positive reception from critics and reviewers since its initial release, who praised various aspects of the title such as the unique storyline, graphics and character animation but many felt divided in regards to the sound design and gameplay. In 2005, a ROM image of the original ST version was leaked online.

== Gameplay ==
Gameplay screenshot.

Power Factor is a side-scrolling action-platform game with run and gun elements similar to Turrican where players take control of a character which in turn is assuming the role Redd Ace on a virtual reality simulator recreating an event where the invading Sinlendo Techmods have seized control over his universe through eleven stages within the installations of the Ceegraian Power Station reactor where the player's ultimate objective is to find six hidden bomb components and use them to destroy the biomechanical invaders. As Redd Ace, players are armed with the Transmat MOW blaster rifle, which can fire unlimited standard shots or a limited number of more powerful shots, and equipped with a rocket pack that holds a limited supply of fuel, which can be restored with item pickups. Although Redd Ace is capable of jumping on his own, the rocket pack can be used to fly over difficult parts and is also needed to progress at certain points later in the game. Redd Ace also has shields which allow him to withstand a certain number of hits; these shields can be restored with item pickups as well. Before starting, players can also choose their preferred difficulty level to begin.

Controlling Redd Ace is done with the D-pad and attacking enemies is performed with either the A or B buttons, while the shooting angle can be adjusted by crouching down. A notable aspect of the game is that there are no dedicated buttons for jumping, instead, the action is executed by pressing up on the D-pad, while holding down on the same direction activates the rocket pack to fly above ground. Pressing Option 2 brings a menu screen that allows the player to check information about the bomb components as well as details on the multiple weapons acquired that can also selected with Option 1, however when pressing the button in front of a computer terminal, the menu instead display a map of the current location players are in and information on enemies, among other elements. There is no password or saving feature, so the game must be completed in one session and once all lives are lost, the game is over.

=== Synopsis ===
The plot of Power Factor is based around a video game within a video game concept: the players take on the role of a character who is in turn playing a virtual reality simulator at the Atarian Leisure Moon resort, in which he assumes the role of the hero Redd Ace. The virtual reality simulator, in the context of the game's fictional world, recreates Ace's famous historical battle against the Sinlendo Techmods from the parallel dimension of Ceeg that invaded his home universe to recover bomb components in the installations of the Ceegraian Power Station that were necessary to defeat the alien race.

== Development and release ==
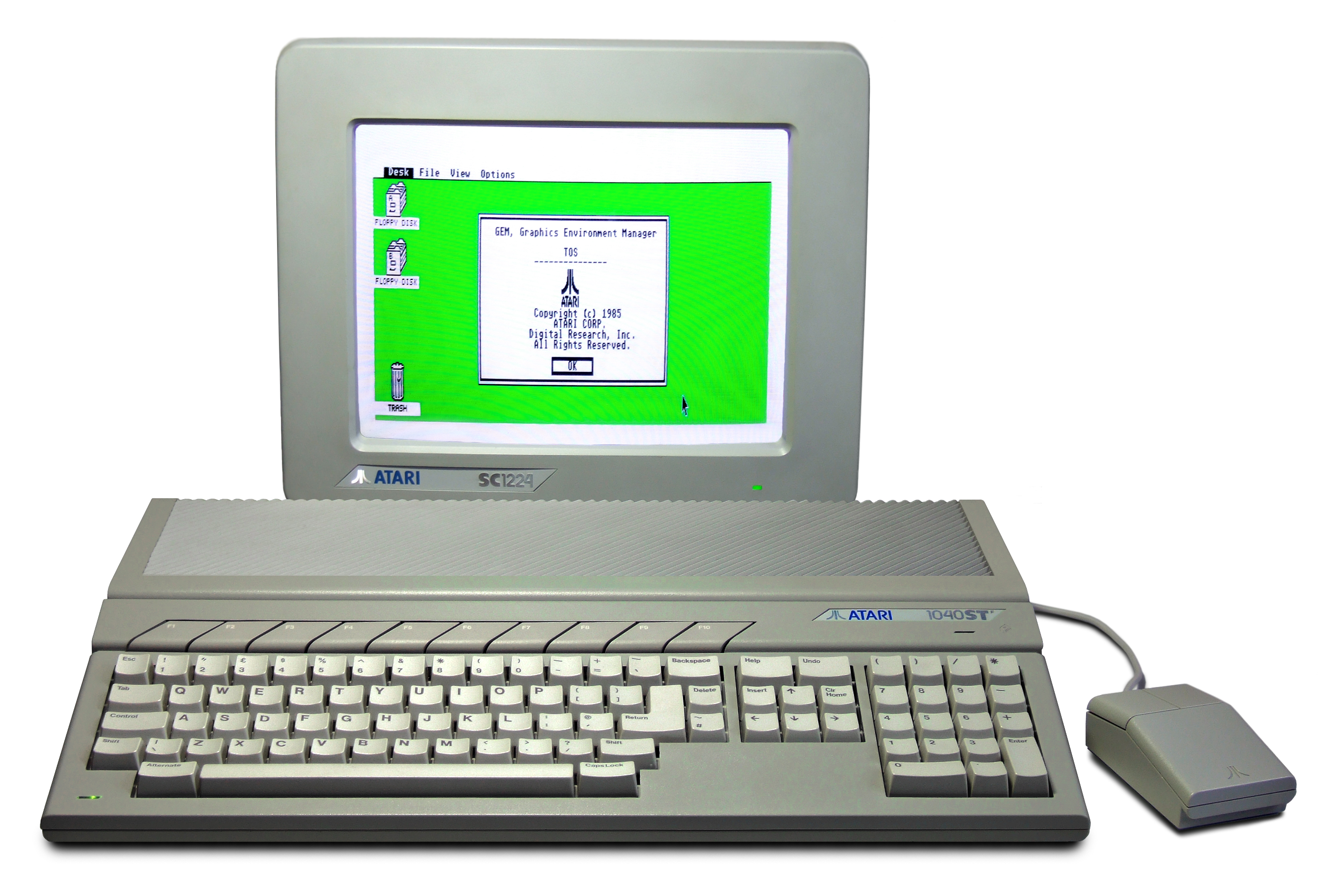
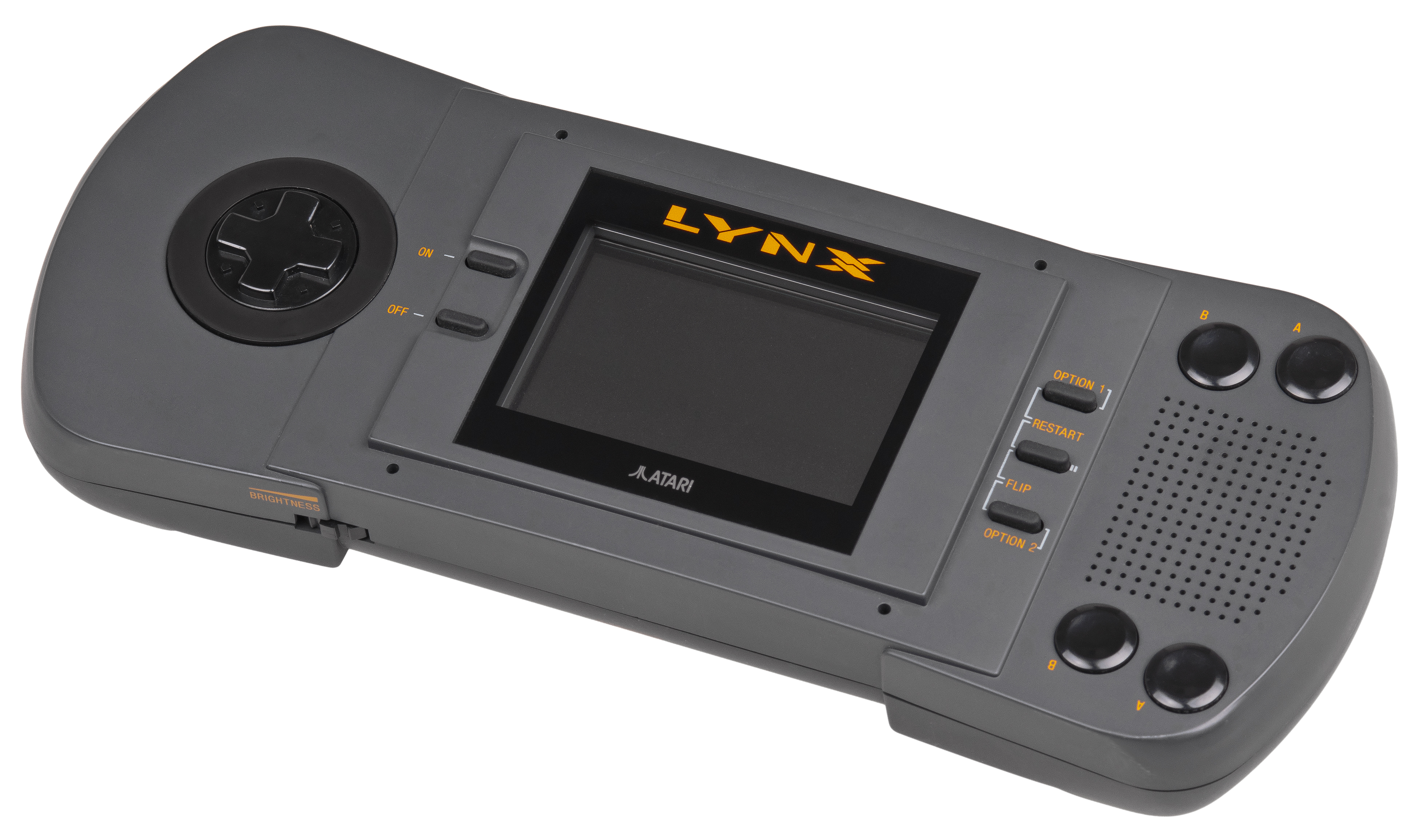
Power Factor started as an Atari ST title before being converted to the Lynx by Hand Made Software.

Power Factor originally began as a project for the Atari ST under the name Red Ace and was being developed by Red Rat Software. In two interviews, programmer Tony Goacher recounted about the development process of the game, stating its development started after obtaining an Atari 1040ST microcomputer from Red Rat and that Psygnosis' Barbarian was a main source of inspiration for the project. As a fan of futuristic titles, Goacher came with the idea of creating an action-adventure game and after presenting the project to Red Rat, they approved it and was titled as such after the company. However, despite nearly reaching completion, the original version was left unreleased due to internal issues at the company and its eventual closure.

Power Factor would later be reworked as an Atari Lynx title instead by Hand Made Software and originally went under the title Redd Ace before being renamed as such, and was first announced in mid 1992 and later showcased to the attendees at Consumer Electronics Show late in the same year with plans to be released around the same time period, however the game was released in 1993 instead.

== Reception ==
Reception

Review scores
| Publication | Score |
|---|---|
| AllGame | 3/5 |
| GamePro | 17.5 / 20 |
| IGN | 7.0 / 10 |
| Consoles + | 85% |
| Lynx User | 7.5 / 10 |
| Joypad | 83% |
| Mega Fun | 52% |
| VideoGames & Computer Entertainment | 7 / 10 |

Power Factor has been met with positive reception from critics and reviewers since its release on the Lynx. Gideon of GamePro commented that Power Factor "delivers highly detailed graphics and smooth animation. Plus, it features the largest bosses ever to hit a Lynx screen. The controls are a bit unresponsive, because of the many functions jammed into the limited control options. However, the limitation doesn't hinder the game play or the fun. The digitized soundtrack and slick heavy metal music enhance the intense action." Robert Jung reviewed the game which was published to IGN giving a score of 7 out of 10.

=== Legacy ===
In December 2005, a nearly complete prototype ROM image of Red Ace was made freely available to download online.
