= The Fidelity Ultimate Chess Challenge =

1991 video game

- Cover art in all regions
- Developer: Telegames
- Publisher: Telegames
- Engine: Fidelity Electronics
- Platform: Atari Lynx
- Release: NA: 1991; EU: 1991
- Genre: Chess
- Modes: Single-player, multiplayer

The Fidelity Ultimate Chess Challenge is a chess video game released in 1991 by Telegames for the Atari Lynx. Players can either play against the game or against another player using the same console. The game engine was written by Fidelity Electronics, makers of various chess computers, and reached a master rating of 2325 Elo.

== Gameplay ==
Gameplay screenshot.

Fidelity Ultimate Chess Challenge is a digital version of chess. It follows all the standard rules of Western chess and can be played one-person (against the computer) or with two players. During play, the game is logged in standard chess notation, and it as well as the players' scores can be reviewed at any time.

The computer offers 17 difficulty levels.

- Time mode: Eight levels are based on analysis time, setting the average response time from 5 seconds (level 1) to 4 minutes (level 8).
- Depth mode: Eight levels are based on search depth, restricting the computer's ability to look ahead from 1 play or 1 half move (level 1) to 8 plays or 8 half moves (level 8).
- Infinite mode: One level uses unlimited time and searching. The computer can be stopped by the user or by the finding of a forced mate.

Players may ask for hints, force the computer to move immediately, and take back moves (up to 100 full moves).

The game offers several aesthetic and feature settings. Players can toggle between gold or silver chess pieces, 2D or 3D chess boards, and turn game sound effects and messages on or off.

== Development and release ==
Fidelity Chess needed to work around some of the Lynx's constraints in its design. In the game's unlimited time and searching level, the computer can take a long time to make its move. Due to this, the Lynx's automatic shutoff feature is disabled. Additionally, since the Lynx has no provision for cartridges with battery-backup memory, players cannot save a game that's in progress.

== Reception ==
Reception

Review scores
Publication	Score
AllGame	3/5
IGN	7.0/10
Aktueller Software Markt	8/12
Atari Gaming Headquarters	7/10
Consoles +	41%
Génération 4	90%
Joypad	75%
Joystick	75%
Play Time	70%
Power Play	70%

The Fidelity Ultimate Chess Challenge was met with mostly positive reception. Robert A. Jung reviewed the game which was published to IGN, and gave it 7 out of 10. He was positive to its gameplay, but was critical to its lack of board set-up option.
