= Bubble Trouble (1994 video game) =

- Developer: Lore Design Limited
- Publisher: Telegames
- Programmer: Andrew Harris
- Platform: Atari Lynx
- Release: NA: 1994; EU: 1994
- Genres: Action-adventure, scrolling shooter
- Mode: Single-player

Bubble Trouble is a 1994 action-adventure scrolling shooter video game developed by Lore Design Limited and published by Telegames in North America and Europe exclusively for the Atari Lynx. In the game, the players assume the role of Travis, a scientist whose experiments go wrong as he becomes trapped in a bubble world.

== Gameplay ==
Gameplay screenshot

Bubble Trouble is an action-adventure shooter game.

== Reception ==
Reception

Review scores
Publication	Score
IGN	7.0 / 10
AllGame	2/5

IGN gave the game a 7/10, writing "Behind Bubble Trouble's screwball premise is a challenging game with a good dose of originality. Though some may find it a bit tough, there's enough appeal to pull most players in for 'one more try'. Complimentary graphics and sound help round out Bubble Trouble into a charming package."

Ultimate Console Database wrote "The shooter/exploration hybrid gameplay takes a bit of work to get into, but once you learn the controls and figure out exactly what it is you need to do it becomes surprisingly addictive. This is one of those games where each time you strive to get just a little bit farther, although lack of any replay value limits the appeal."
