= Dracula the Undead (video game) =

1991 video game

- Cover art in all regions
- Developer: Hand Made Software
- Publisher: Atari Corporation
- Composers: Paul Tonge; Tony Williams
- Platform: Atari Lynx
- Release: 1991
- Genre: Adventure
- Mode: Single-player

Dracula the Undead is a 1991 adventure video game developed by Hand Made Software and published by Atari Corporation for the Atari Lynx. The game is loosely based on Bram Stoker's novel Dracula and features Bram Stoker in the story as the narrator.

== Gameplay ==
Gameplay screenshot.

The player takes on the role of Jonathan Harker as he explores and later tries to escape from Dracula's Castle. In the game you wake up and can explore the castle by moving from room to room. The game controls are like those of a point and click, where you can interact with a certain number items in each room. You can also talk and interact with other NPC characters. Certain choices can end with death and a The End screen, requiring the player to start over. The player's ability to achieve the best ending depends his or her ability to take notes of important facts and events with Harker's notebook.

== Plot ==
The game loosely follows chapters two through four of the original novel. Jonathan Harker, a solicitor, awakens and meets Count Dracula. Dracula informs Harker that he will be out for the day and they will conduct their business later that evening. Dracula invites Harker to explore the castle except for rooms which are locked, then leaves. Harker is later astonished to look out a window to see Dracula climbing down the castle wall.

Harker climbs out of the window and scrambles across the castle wall to another window. He explores another part of the castle where he finds papers detailing Dracula's plans for settling in London and the maze-like catacombs underneath the castle. After finding Dracula's coffin, Harker retreats back across the wall.

After opening a stuck door to another room he falls asleep and is visited by three beautiful women. They move to attack him but Dracula stops them, telling them they can have him tomorrow after he is done with Harker. Harker awakens the next day to himself locked in his bedroom. Dracula is gone. Harker is now desperate to escape the castle, for if he does not then the brides of Dracula will find him and give him their "voluptuous kisses."

== Development and release ==
An updated port of Dracula the Undead for the Atari Jaguar CD was in development by Atari Corporation and was first announced in 1994, but it never released.

== Reception ==
Reception

Review scores
Publication	Score
AllGame	3/5
GamePro	18 / 20
IGN	7.0 / 10
Consoles +	65%
Digital Press	8 / 10
GamesMaster	90%
Game Zero Magazine	70.0 / 100
Joypad	93%
Lynx User	9 / 10
Megablast	67%
Mega Fun	83%
Player One	80%
Video Games	70%
VideoGames & Computer Entertainment	7 / 10

Robert A. Jung reviewed the game which was later published to IGN. In his final verdict he wrote "Dracula the Undead offers traditional adventuring fare with an unusual premise, with enough challenge and appeal to satisfy most adventurers. The inability to save a game in progress hurts, but dedicated players who are willing to live with this flaw are encouraged to give the Count a visit." He then gave a score of 7 out of 10. Game Zero Magazine also reviewed the game giving a score of 70 out of 100.
