= Telegames =

American video game company

Telegames, Inc.
- Industry: Consumer electronics, video games
- Headquarters: Mabank, Texas, U.S.
- Products: Ultimate Card Games; Ultimate Brain Games
- Website: www.telegames.com

Telegames, Inc. is an American video game company based in Mabank, Texas, with a sister operation based in England.

Telegames was known for supporting not just modern game systems but also classic game systems, after they had been abandoned by its manufacturer. For example, by 1997 Telegames was the Atari Jaguar's only software publisher, and continued to publish for the system up through 1998, licensed from the Atari brand owner JT Storage. Effective September 2004 though, Telegames, Inc. ceased support for all "classic" and "orphaned" video game systems and software in order to support only modern consoles.

Until 2018, the company was focusing on modern gaming consoles by developing and publishing games for the Nintendo DS and Nintendo 3DS handheld game systems and Apple's iPad. The company's current whereabouts are unknown, as of 2024.

== Product history ==
Below is a list of all games that were either developed or published by Telegames, Inc.

Mobile phone

- Universal Chaos

Nintendo 3DS

- Classic Games Overload: Card & Puzzle Edition

Apple iPad

- Solitaire Overload Part 1 (now delisted)
- Solitaire Overload Part 2 (now delisted)
- Solitaire Overload Part 3 (now delisted)
- Solitaire Overload Complete (now delisted)

Nintendo DS

- Solitaire Overload
- Solitaire Overload Plus
- Ultimate Card Games
- Ultimate Puzzle Games: Sudoku Edition (2007)

Game Boy Advance

- BackTrack
- Hardcore Pinball
- Santa Claus Saves the Earth (only released in Europe, USA version cancelled)
- Soccer Kid
- Ultimate Arcade Games
- Ultimate Brain Games
- Ultimate Card Games
- Ultimate Puzzle Games
- Ultimate Winter Games
- Urban Yeti!

Atari 2600

- Astroblast (re-release, originally released by M Network)
- Bump 'N' Jump (re-release, originally released by Mattel Electronics)
- Glacier Patrol (completed but unreleased by Sunrise Software)
- International Soccer (re-release, originally released by M Network)
- Kung Fu Superkicks (re-release, originally released by Xonox)
- Lock 'n' Chase (re-release, originally released by M Network)
- Night Stalker (modified PAL release, originally released in North America by M Network as Dark Cavern)
- Quest For Quintana Roo (re-release, originally released by Sunrise Software)
- Space Attack (re-release, originally released by M Network)
- Super Challenge Baseball (re-release, originally released by M Network)
- Super Challenge Football (re-release, originally released by M Network)
- Universal Chaos (completed version of an unreleased CBS Electronics port of Exidy's Targ)

ColecoVision

- Alcazar: The Forgotten Fortress
- Amazing Bumpman (originally planned to be released by Sunrise Software as Number Bumper)
- Boulder Dash
- Cosmic Crisis
- Fathom (re-release, originally released by Imagic)
- Kung Fu Superkicks (re-release, originally released by Xonox)
- Motocross Racer (re-release, originally released by Xonox)
- Rock 'N' Bolt
- Skiing (originally planned to be released by Coleco)
- Strike It!
- Tank Wars
- Tournament Tennis (re-release, originally released by Imagic)

Coleco Adam

- Kung Fu Superkicks (re-release, originally released by Xonox)

Atari Lynx

- Bubble Trouble
- Desert Strike: Return To The Gulf
- Double Dragon
- European Soccer Challenge
- Fat Bobby
- The Fidelity Ultimate Chess Challenge
- Hyperdrome
- Krazy Ace Miniature Golf
- Qix
- Raiden
- Super Off-Road

Atari Jaguar

- Breakout 2000
- Brutal Sports Football
- International Sensible Soccer
- Iron Soldier 2 (released both on the Atari Jaguar and Atari Jaguar CD)
- Towers II: Plight of the Stargazer
- World Tour Racing (Atari Jaguar CD)
- Worms
- Zero 5

Game Boy Color

- Rhino Rumble
- Shamus (released in North America by Vatical Entertainment)
- Towers: Lord Baniff's Deceit (released in North America by Vatical Entertainment)
- Yars' Revenge

Windows

- BackTrack
- Classic Gamer: ColecoVision Hits Volume 1
- Personal Arcade
- Planet Blupi
- Towers II: Plight of the Stargazer

PlayStation

- Iron Soldier 3
- Rascal Racers
- Santa Claus Saves the Earth (only released in Europe)
- Soccer Kid (only released in Europe)
- Ultimate Brain Games

Cancelled

- Classic Games Overload: Board Game Edition (Nintendo 3DS)
- Hardcore Pool (Game Boy Advance)
- Oggy and the Cockroaches (Game Boy Advance)
- Puzzle Overload (Nintendo DS)
- Ultimate Brain Games (Nintendo DS)
- Ultimate Pocket Games (Game Boy Advance)
- Towers II: Plight of the Stargazer (Game Boy Color)

== Telegames Personal Arcade ==
The Telegames Personal Arcade was the US version of the Dina by Bit Corporation. This slim console could play both ColecoVision and Sega SG-1000 cartridges. It came equipped with NES-styled controllers, and even had a built in game called "Meteoric Shower". Since the DINA control pads did not contain the numeric keypad of the actual ColecoVision controller, they were mounted on the unit itself. It also sported a "pause" button that could be used for SG-1000 games.
