= John Smedley (business executive) =

American business executive

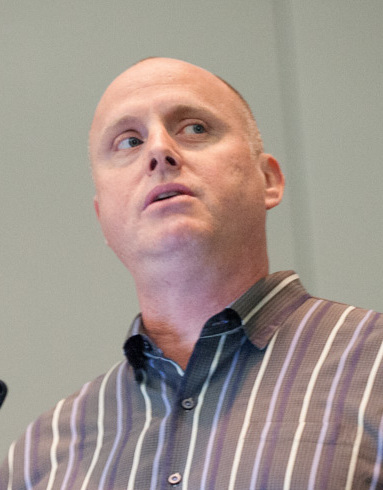
- Smedley giving a presentation at the 2012 Game Developers Conference
- Born: August 27, 1968 (age 58)
- Occupation: Business executive

John Smedley (born August 27, 1968) is an American business executive. He is the general manager at Amazon Games. He was the former president of Daybreak Game Company, which changed its name from Sony Online Entertainment in 2015.

== Early life ==
Smedley was born on August 27, 1968. He became heavily involved in tabletop role-playing games such as Dungeons & Dragons, which would later give him the ideas for EverQuest. He attended Mt. Carmel High School in San Diego, California, before graduating and attending San Diego State University.

== Career ==
In the early 1990s Smedley started a development company called Knight Technologies that produced contract games.

Smedley was involved with the creation and development of the original EverQuest, and was co-founder of Verant Interactive, Inc., which became Sony Online Entertainment, Inc. (SOE) after it was purchased by Sony Pictures Entertainment in 2000.

In 2007, he announced a change in direction for Sony Online Entertainment, including a broadening of business models beyond the subscription model and pursuing female consumers to balance their audience, which was 85% male at the time.

On August 24, 2014, a hacking group called Lizard Squad claimed that the plane on which John Smedley was flying (American Airlines Flight 362 from Dallas, Texas to San Diego, California) had explosives on board. This led to the flight being diverted to Phoenix, Arizona.

On July 22, 2015, after threatening a member of the hacker group Lizard Squad on Twitter, Smedley stepped down from his position as president and CEO of Daybreak Games Company. Four months after stepping down, Smedley announced the startup of his own game development company, Pixelmage Games, and a game called Hero's Song. In January 2017, Pixelmage announced the closing of the studio and subsequently the development of Hero's Song. He became the general manager of Amazon Game Studios San Diego.

On January 11, 2023, he announced his departure from Amazon Game Studios. In an email to staff, Smedley wrote that "after a lot of thought, I've decided it's time for me to try my hand at something new." A spokesperson for Amazon added that Smedley would remain on the team until "the team is fully transitioned before he moves on."
