= Atari Lynx =

Handheld game console

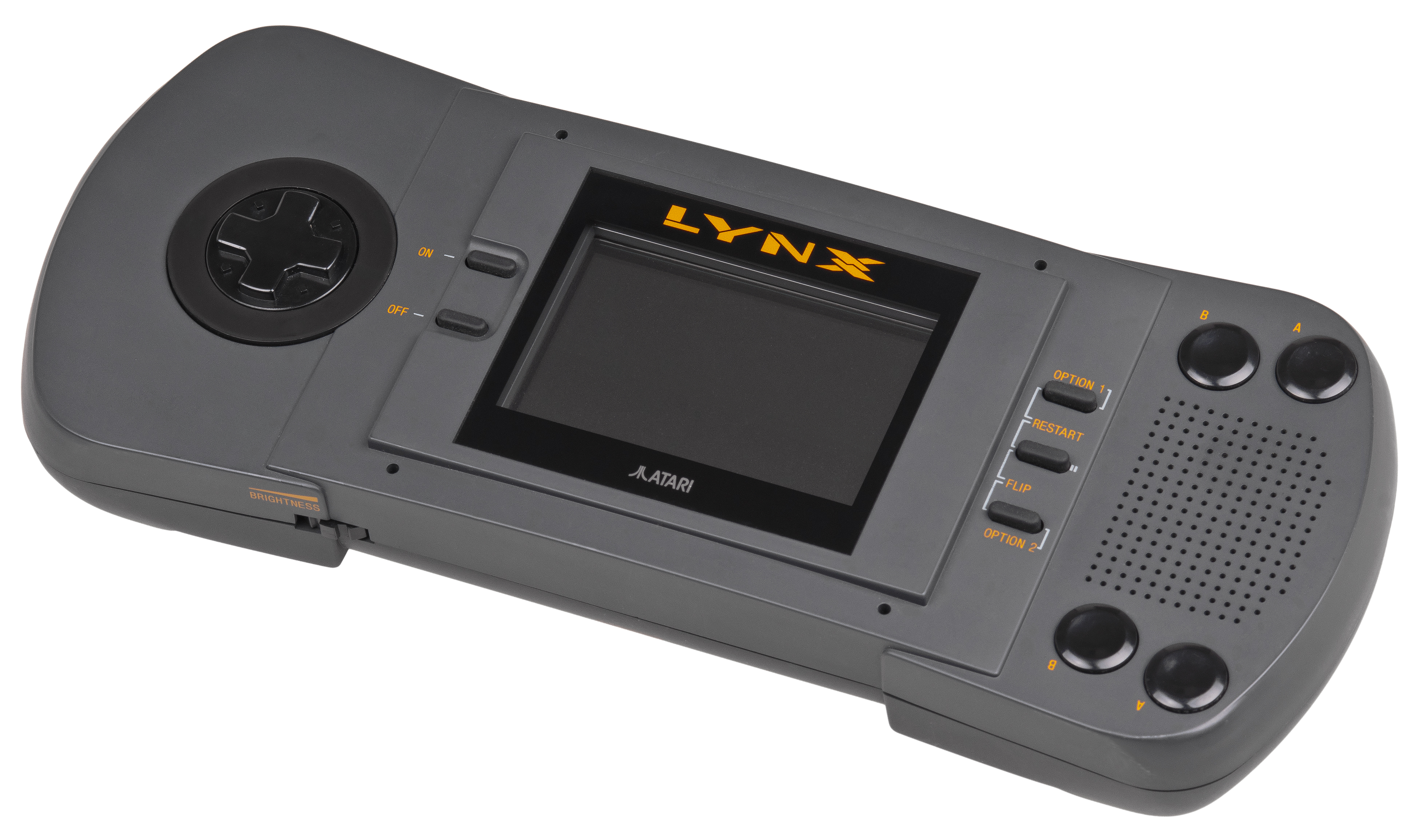
- Atari Lynx I
- Developer: Epyx
- Manufacturer: Atari Corporation
- Type: Handheld game console
- Generation: Fourth
- Released: September 1, 1989
- Lifespan: 1989–1995
- Introductory price: US$179.99 (equivalent to $470 in 2025)
- Discontinued: 1995
- Units sold: 2 million
- Media: ROM cartridge
- CPU: "Mikey" (VLSI VL65NC02 8-bit CPU + Sound processor + LCD driver)
- Memory: 64 KB RAM
- Display: Backlit 3.5" color LCD; 160 × 102 standard resolution (16,320 addressable pixels)
- Graphics: "Suzy" (16-bit custom CMOS)
- Sound: 4 channels, 8-bit DAC or PSG sound
- Best-selling game: RoadBlasters

The Atari Lynx is a fourth-generation handheld game console released by Atari Corporation in September 1989 in North America and 1990 in Europe and Japan. It was the first handheld game console with a color liquid-crystal display. Powered by a 4 MHz 65C02 8-bit CPU and a custom 16-bit blitter, the Lynx was more advanced than Nintendo's monochrome Game Boy, released five months earlier. It also competed with Sega's Game Gear and NEC's TurboExpress, released the following year.

The system was developed at Epyx by two former designers of the Amiga personal computers. The project was called the Handy Game or simply Handy. In 1991, Atari replaced the Lynx with a smaller model internally referred to as the Lynx II. Atari published a total of 71 games for the Lynx before it was discontinued in 1995.

== History ==
The Lynx system was originally developed by Epyx as the Handy Game. In 1986, two former Amiga designers, RJ Mical and Dave Needle, had been asked by a former manager at Amiga, Dave Morse, to design a portable gaming system. Morse now worked at Epyx, a game software company with a recent string of hit games. Morse's son had asked him if he could make a portable gaming system, prompting a meeting with Mical and Needle to discuss the idea. Morse convinced Mical and Needle and they were hired by Epyx to be a part of the design team. Planning and design of the console began in 1986 and was completed in 1987. Epyx first showed the Handy system at the Winter Consumer Electronics Show (CES) in January 1989. Facing financial difficulties, Epyx sought partners. Nintendo, Sega, and other companies declined, but Atari and Epyx eventually agreed that Atari would handle production and marketing, and Epyx would handle software development. Epyx declared bankruptcy by the end of the year, so Atari essentially owned the entire project. Both Atari and others had to purchase Amigas from Atari arch-rival Commodore in order to develop Lynx software.

The Handy was designed to run games from the cartridge format, and the game data must be copied from ROM to RAM before it can be used. Thus, less RAM is then available and each game's initial loading is slow. There are trace remnants of a cassette tape interface physically capable of being programmed to read a tape. Lynx developers have noted that "there is still reference of the tape and some hardware addresses" and an updated vintage Epyx manual describes the bare existence of what could be utilized for tape support. A 2009 retrospective interview with Mical clarifies that there is no truth to some early reports claiming that games were loaded from tape, and elaborates, "We did think about hard disk a little."

The networking system was originally developed to run over infrared links and codenamed RedEye. This was changed to a cable-based networking system before the final release as the infrared beam was too easily interrupted when players walked through the beam, according to Peter Engelbrite. Engelbrite developed the first recordable eight-player co-op game, and the only eight-player game for the Lynx, Todd's Adventures in Slime World.

Atari changed the internal speaker and removed the thumb stick on the control pad. At Summer 1989 CES, Atari's press demonstration included the "Portable Color Entertainment System", which was changed to "Lynx" when distributed to resellers, initially retailing in the US at US$179.95 (equivalent to about $470 in 2025).

Its launch was successful. Atari reported that it had sold 90% of the 50,000 units shipped in the launch month in the U.S. with a limited launch in New York. US sales in 1990 were approximately 500,000 units according to the Associated Press. In late 1991, it was reported that Atari sales estimates were about 800,000, which Atari claimed was within its expected projections. Lifetime sales by 1995 amount to fewer than 7 million units when combined with the Game Gear. In comparison, 16 million Game Boy units were sold by 1995 because of its superior durability, pricing, battery life, and game library, notably the pack-in hit Tetris.

As with the console units, the game cartridge design evolved over the first year of the console's release. The first generation of cartridges are flat, and designed to be stackable for ease of storage. However, this design proved to be very difficult to remove from the console and was replaced by a second design. This style, called "tabbed" or "ridged", adds two small tabs on the underside to aid in removal. The original flat style cartridges can be stacked on top of the newer cartridges, but the newer cartridges can not be easily stacked on each other, nor were they stored easily. Thus a third style, the "curved lip" style was produced, and all official and third-party cartridges during the console's lifespan were released (or re-released) using this style.

In May 1991, Sega launched its Game Gear portable gaming handheld with a color screen. In comparison to the Lynx it had shorter battery life (3–4 hours as opposed to 4-5 for the Lynx), but it is slightly smaller, has significantly more games, and cost $30 less than the Lynx at launch.

Retailers such as Game and Toys "R" Us continued to sell the Lynx well into the mid-1990s on the back of the Atari Jaguar launch, helped by magazines such as Ultimate Future Games which continued to cover the Lynx alongside the new generation of 32-bit and 64-bit consoles.

=== Lynx II ===
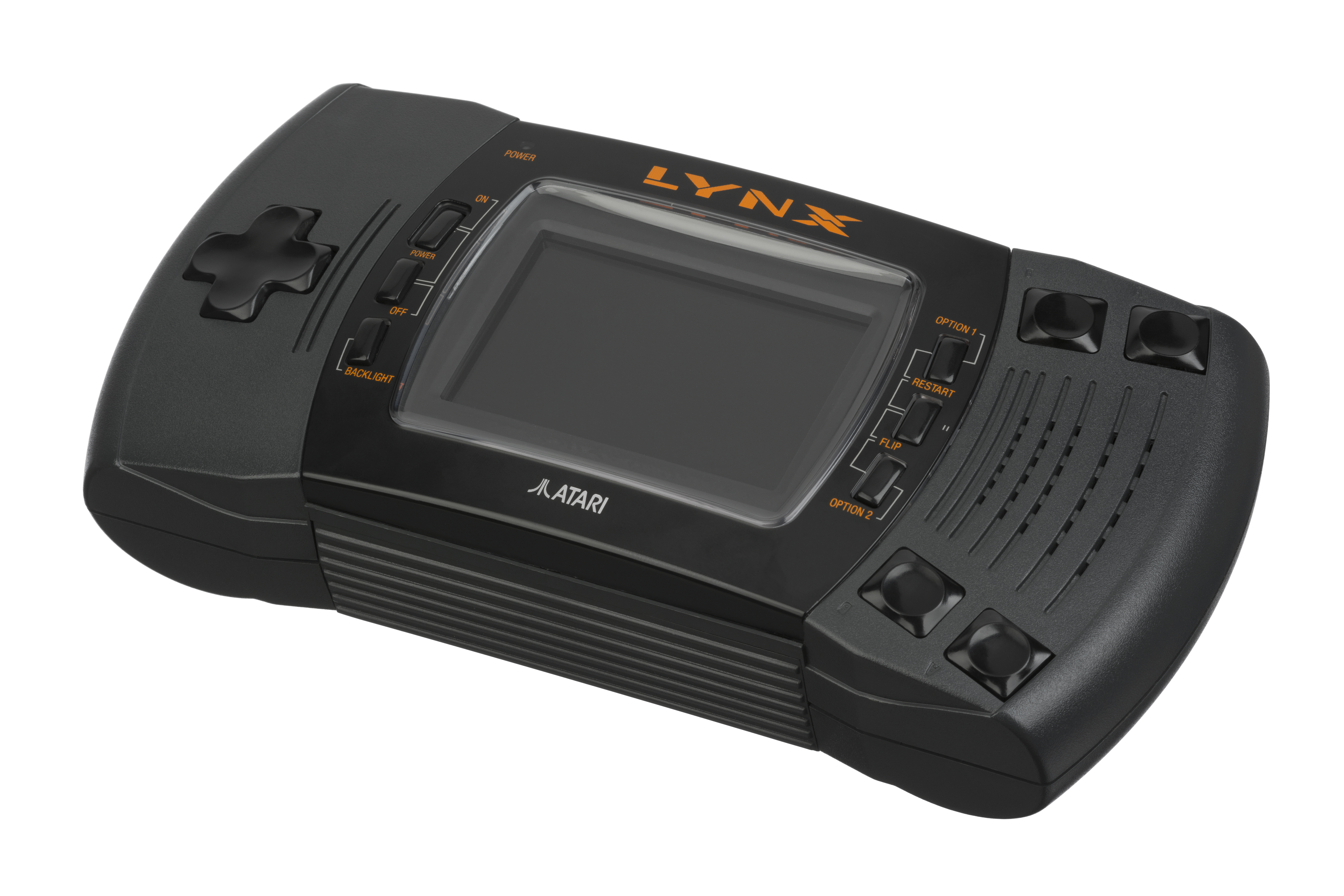
The Lynx II, smaller and lighter than the original

In July 1991, Atari introduced a new version of the Lynx, internally called the "Lynx II", with a new marketing campaign, new packaging, slightly improved hardware, better battery life, and a sleeker look. It has rubber hand grips and a clearer backlit color screen with a power save option (which turns off the backlighting). The monaural headphone jack of the original Lynx was replaced with one wired for stereo. The Lynx II was available without any accessories, dropping the price to $99 (equivalent to $240 in 2025).

=== Decline ===
In 1993, Atari started shifting its focus away from the Lynx in order to prepare for the launch of the Jaguar. A few games were released during that time, including Battlezone 2000. Support for the Lynx was formally discontinued in 1995. After the commercial failure of the Jaguar, Atari ceased all game development and hardware manufacturing by early 1996 and merged with JTS, Inc. on July 30 of that year.

== Features ==
The Atari Lynx has a backlit color LCD, switchable right- and left-handed (upside down) configuration, and the ability to network with other units via Comlynx cable. The maximum stable connection allowed is eight players. Each Lynx needs a copy of the game, and one cable can connect two machines. The cables can be connected into a chain.

The leading-edge display was the most expensive component, so the color choice was one of economy. If the low-cost glass and drivers would have supported a million colors, I would have done it.

— Dave Needle, Lynx co-designer

The Lynx was cited as the "first gaming console with hardware support for zooming and distortion of sprites". With a 4096 color palette and integrated maths and graphics co-processors (including a sprite engine unit), its color graphics display was said to be the key defining feature in the system's competition against Nintendo's monochromatic Game Boy. The fast pseudo-3D graphics features were made possible on a minimal hardware system by co-designer Dave Needle having "invented the technique for planar expansion/shrinking capability" and using stretched triangles instead of full polygons.

== Technical specifications ==
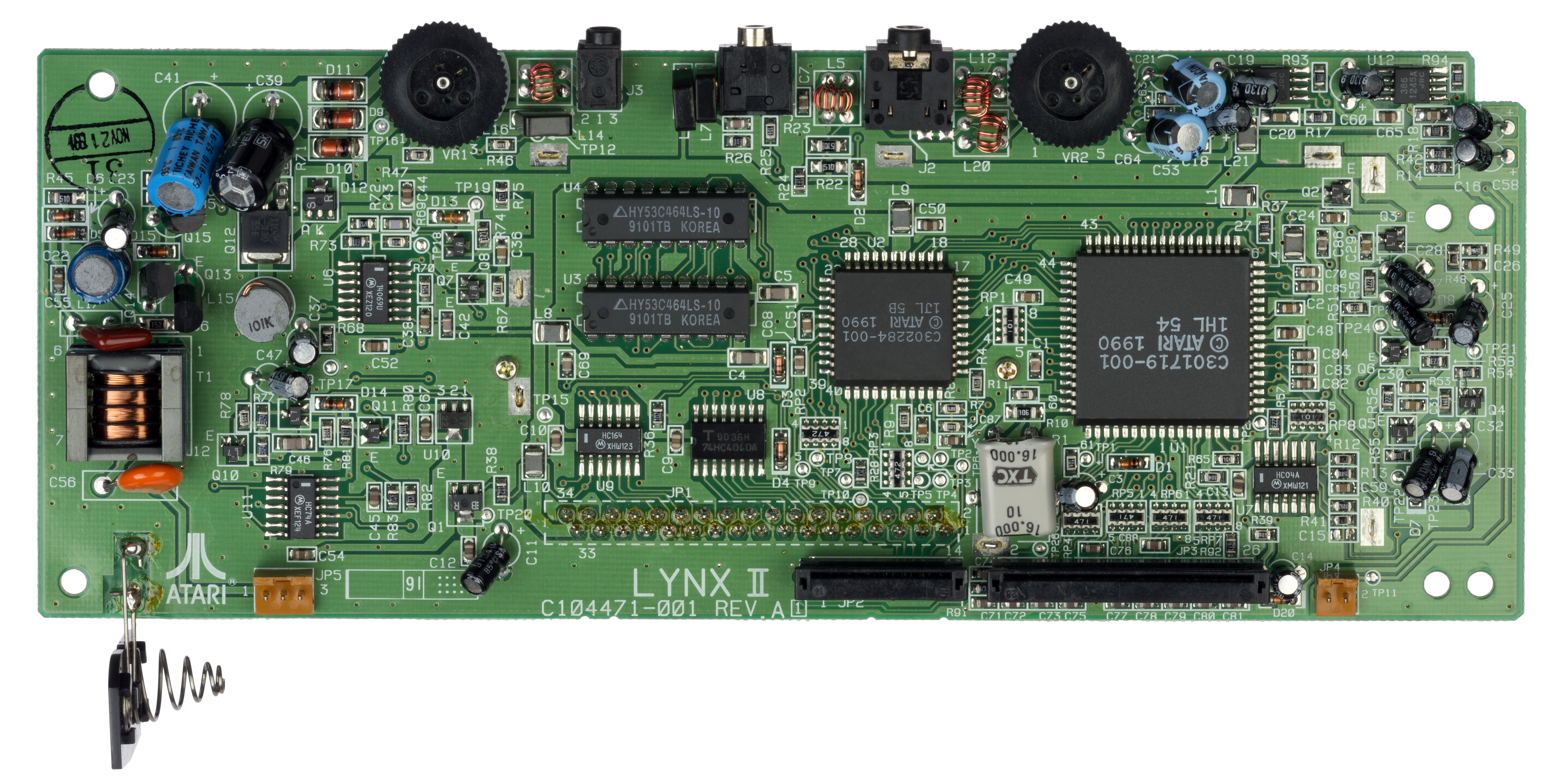
The motherboard of an Atari Lynx II. The larger chip is the "Mikey" and the smaller is called "Suzy".

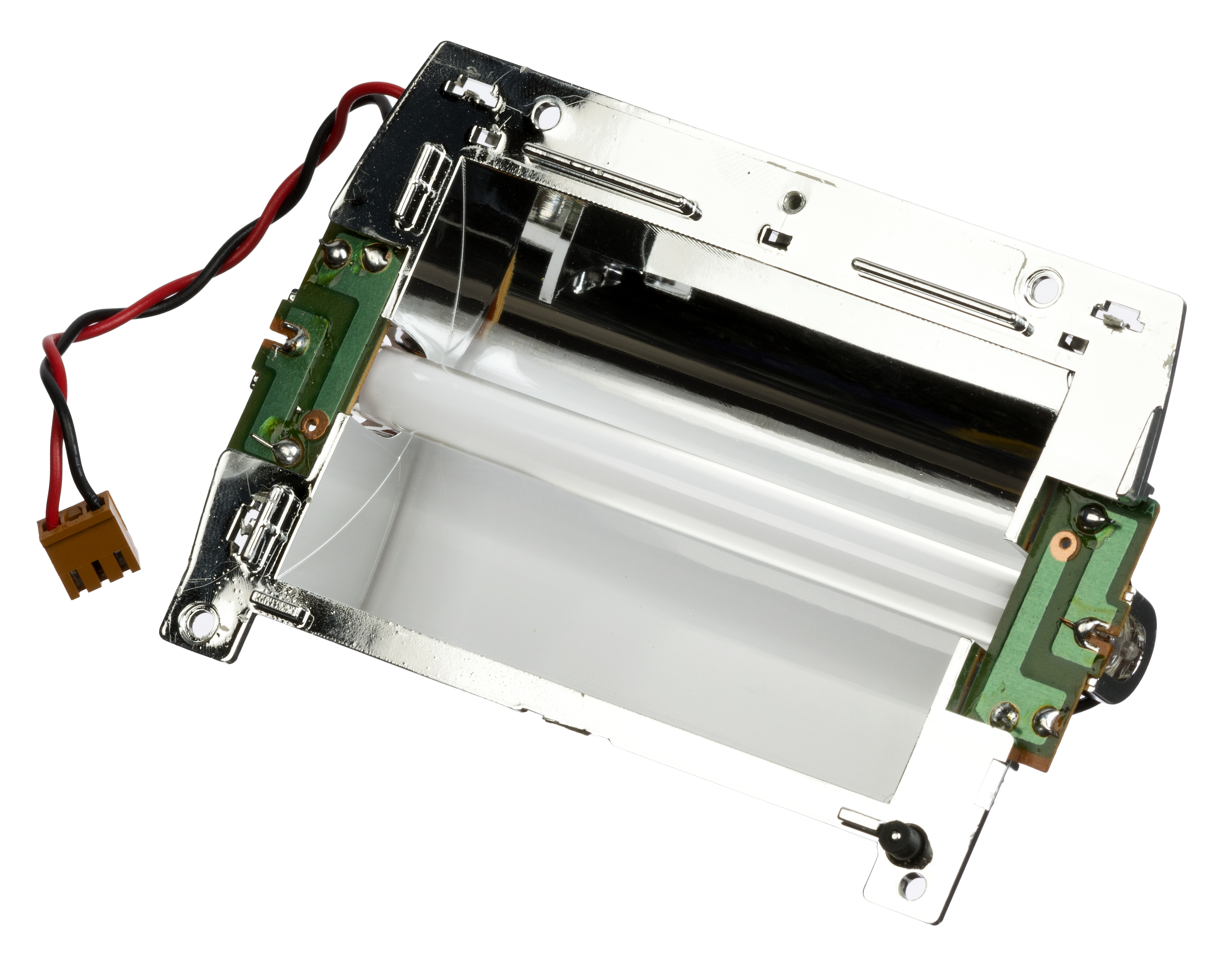
The backlight from an Atari Lynx II. The CCFL tube has high power consumption.

- Mikey (8-bit VLSI custom CMOS chip running at 16 MHz)
  - On Lynx I a VLSI 8-bit VL65NC02 processor (based on the MOS 6502) running at up to 4 MHz (3.6 MHz average). In the stereo version of Lynx II a 65C02 with all instructions.
  - Sound engine
    - 4 channel sound
    - 8-bit DAC for each channel (4 channels × 8-bits/channel = 32 bits commonly quoted) these four sound channels can also switch in analogue sound mode to generate PSG sound. PSG sound is created by setting up the taps of a LFSR to produce various pulse waves or pseudo-random noise.
  - Video DMA driver for liquid-crystal display
    - Custom built and designed by Jay Miner and Dave Morse
    - 160×102 pixels resolution
    - 4,096 color (12-bit) palette
    - 16 simultaneous colors (4 bits) from palette per scanline
    - Variable frame rate (up to 75 frames/second)
  - Eight system timers (two reserved for LCD timing, one for UART)
  - Interrupt controller
  - UART (for Comlynx) (fixed format 8E1, up to 62500 Bd / TurboMode 1,000,000Bd)
  - 512 bytes of bootstrap and game-card loading ROM
- Suzy (16-bit VLSI custom CMOS chip running at 16 MHz)
  - Unlimited number of blitter "sprites" with collision detection
  - Hardware sprite scaling, distortion, and tilting effects
  - Hardware decoding of compressed sprite data
  - Hardware clipping and multi-directional scrolling
  - Math engine
    - Hardware 16-bit × 16-bit → 32-bit multiply with optional accumulation; 32-bit ÷ 16-bit → 16-bit divide
    - Parallel processing of CPU
- RAM: 64 KB 120ns DRAM
- Cartridges: 128, 256, 512 KB and (with bank-switching) 1 MB
- Ports:
  - Headphone port (3.5 mm stereo; wired for mono on the original Lynx)
  - ComLynx (multiple unit communications, serial)
- LCD Screen: 3.5" diagonal
- Battery holder (six AA) 4–5 hours (Lynx I) 5–6 hours (Lynx II)

== Legacy ==
On March 16, 1998, three years after the Lynx's discontinuation, Hasbro Interactive acquired all of Atari's assets after buying out JTS for $5 million. On May 14, 1999, Atari fans successfully lobbied Hasbro to release the Jaguar's patents and rights into the public domain, transforming the console into an open game development platform and allowing software developers to make games for it without a licensing agreement. Carl Forhan, founder of Songbird Productions, spoke by phone with a Hasbro legal representative to ensure that the press release also included the Lynx, as the announcement did not mention it. Hasbro's legal representative assured Forhan that the Lynx would be granted the same freedom. Jayson Hill, former public relations manager for Hasbro, hoped that fans would appreciate Hasbro getting both the Lynx and the Jaguar into the public domain. Since its discontinuation, the Lynx, like the Jaguar, has continued to receive support from a homebrew community.

In 2008, Atari was honored at the 59th Annual Technology & Engineering Emmy Awards for pioneering the development of handheld games with the Lynx.

In 2022, the compilation Atari 50 released with a handful of popular Lynx titles, marking the first time that classic Lynx software would be officially rereleased by Atari. A collection of Lynx games have also been released as standalone titles outside of the Atari 50 compilation as well on other platforms such as Steam and the Evercade.

== See also ==
- List of Atari Lynx games
- History of Atari
