= Sniper Elite (video game) =

2005 video game

- Developer: Rebellion Developments (Note: Wii version developed by Raylight Studios.)
- Publishers: Namco Hometek (NA); MC2 France (Note: The Nintendo Wii version was published by Reef Entertainment.)
- Directors: Jason Kingsley; Christopher Kingsley
- Producer: Emerson Best
- Designer: Emerson Best
- Programmers: Kevin Floyer-Lea; Kieran Donaldson
- Artists: James Fraser; Mark Bradshaw
- Composer: Tom Bible
- Series: Sniper Elite
- Platforms: Windows; PlayStation 2; Xbox; Wii
- Release: Windows, PlayStation 2; EU: 30 September 2005; AU: 6 October 2005; NA: 18 October 2005; Xbox; AU: 6 October 2005; EU: 7 October 2005; NA: 18 October 2005; Wii; NA: 7 December 2010; EU: 10 December 2010
- Genres: Tactical shooter, stealth
- Modes: Single-player, multiplayer

Sniper Elite (initially known as Sniper Elite: Berlin 1945) is a 2005 tactical shooter and stealth video game created by Rebellion Developments. Set during the final days of World War II in Berlin, the game follows Karl Fairburne, an American OSS operative disguised as a German sniper. The objective of the game is to prevent German nuclear technology from falling into the hands of invading Soviet forces. The single-player campaign of Sniper Elite consists of 28 missions in total, throughout which the player is controlled from a third-person perspective, while they are controlled from a first-person mode when using the sniper rifle. Sniper Elite also supported online multiplayer on the PlayStation 2 and Xbox video game consoles.

Announced at E3 2003, Rebellion said that they worked on making the game realistic, having developed an advanced version of their game engine to satisfy the gameplay elements. Released in 2005 for Windows, PlayStation 2, and Xbox, Namco Hometek and MC2 France were its publishers. A Nintendo Wii version was released in 2010. Sniper Elite received generally favourable reviews, with reviewers praising the gameplay, sniping mechanics, and the AI system, while having mixed opinions on the game's missions and graphics. It won an award in the 2005 The Independent Game Developers' Association Awards, for the best PC/Console game. Rebellion went onto establish the Sniper Elite franchise, publishing its sequel, Sniper Elite V2, in 2012.

== Gameplay ==
A screenshot showcasing Karl Fairburne holding a gun near the Brandenburg Gate in Berlin.

Sniper Elite is a tactical shooter and stealth video game. The character's main weapon is a sniper rifle, however, he can also use several World War II-era weapons, including a silenced pistol, submachine guns, light machine guns, hand grenades that can also be used to set up tripwire booby traps, time bombs, and knives. For most of the game, the player is in third-person mode, however, when viewing through the scope, the game takes place in first-person mode. The player has to take several factors while sniping, such as the direction of the wind, heart rate, breathing, and gravity. While using a sniper, the game can trigger a slow motion effect from the perspective of the bullet during a well-placed sniper shot, such as a head shot or a shot on a moving target. The game then shows the player the statistics of the shot. Throughout a mission, the player can check their statistics, while at the end of each mission, the player earns a total score. When being attacked by enemies, the player will get an indicator on the compass to know where the enemies are firing from. The player can search enemy corpses when killing them, letting them pick up ammo, grenades, and first-aid kits.

Sniper Elite has several difficulty modes, with higher difficulty modes limiting the number of saves the player can make throughout a mission. The player is tasked with completing missions throughout the game; a large mission is divided into several smaller missions. Sniper Elite features 28 smaller missions in total. Mission tasks include assassinations of high-ranking officials and stealing secret documents; there are also optional objectives. The player can also destroy tanks by shooting at the gas cap or detonating them with a dynamite, as well as use their binoculars to look for enemies, for example when hiding.

Featuring a single-player campaign, Sniper Elite also supported online multiplayer on the PlayStation 2 and Xbox video game consoles. There, the player can customise the character's appearance and play one of the three available game modes, Deathmatch, Team Deathmatch, and Assassination. Up to eight players can play a multiplayer match. Additionally, the console versions offer a two-player cooperative mode, letting the player complete single-player missions with a partner. In this mode, players can revive each other if wounded.

== Plot ==
In April 1945, as rival American and Soviet armies encircle Berlin, American OSS agent Karl Fairburne (Note: Early in the development, the character was known as Peter Mauer.) is deployed into the ruins disguised as a German soldier. Authorised by General George S. Patton, Fairburne's objective is to prevent the Soviet NKVD from seizing German nuclear technology, personnel, and research. Raised in Berlin before West Point, Fairburne uses his knowledge of the city to operate between three warring factions: the defending Nazi remnants, the invading Soviet forces, and the Allied-aligned German Resistance. His initial operations involve assisting local resistance fighters, gathering intelligence from dead drops near the Reichstag, and assassinating Nazi official Martin Bormann alongside his NKVD contact at the Brandenburg Gate to halt a high-level defect.

Fairburne then focuses on securing critical intelligence and disabling Soviet infrastructure across the war-torn city. He aids in the exfiltration of an embedded OSS spy by providing covering sniper fire from the French Cathedral at Gendarmenmarkt Square. Soon after, he infiltrates the NKVD-occupied fuel dump at Karlshorst, where he assassiantes the Soviet commander to retrieve a code book before destroying the facility with timed explosives. To stop the transport of captured German nuclear scientists to the USSR, Fairburne secures surrounding U-Bahn channels, destroys and enemy reinforcement convoy, and ambushes NKVD special commandos at Anhalter Station to hold the location until Allied forces arrive.

Moving through the underground rail network to Nordsig, Fairburne targets a civilian factory storing imported Norwegian heavy water. He inflitrates the facility, sabotages the storage tanks, and extracts Dr. Max Lohmann, a vital German nuclear scientist, alongside heavy water samples with the assistance of an OSS assault team. Shortly afterward, Fairburne disrupts Soviet logistics across Berlin by neutralising couriers and artillery before intercepting an NKVD unit at the Schloss, successfully securing a captured prototype of an advanced V2 rocket motor.

With the Soviet encirclement tightening, Fairburne rescues his stranded escape pilot and protects surviving German Resistance members from Soviet armour pushing toward Tempelhof Airport. At the airfield, Fairburne neutralises perimeter sentries and assaults the control tower to disable the facility's anti-aircraft defences and communications trailer. Under heavy enemy fire, Fairburne boards a departing aircraft piloted by his rescue contact, successfully exfiltrating Dr. Lohmann and the recovered nuclear research safely to Allied lines.

== Development and release ==
Sniper Elite was developed by the British studio Rebellion Developments. Namco Hometek published the game in North America. MC2 France was also one of its publishers. Announced at E3 2003, Rebellion described it as taking place "in the transitional period of WWII and the Cold War". Initially titled Sniper Elite: Berlin 1945, the game's name was later retitled to just Sniper Elite, when it was announced by Namco Hometek in 2005.

In an interview with IGN, the Rebellion software producer Emerson Best said that the game's story is based of a historical fact, rather than a fictional one. Rebellion aimed to make the game "fairly realistic", adding that the team was influenced by some games of the military simulation genre. It was developed with an advanced version of the engine that Rebellion used in their previous games; they implemented many changes to satisfy the new gameplay elements. Additionally, Best said that their artificial intelligence (AI) system is "very advanced and comprehensive". The enemies can search areas, attempt to rescue wounded allies, and cover from fire. While the game features missions, Best said that it "is realistically open ended", as the player can completed objectives in any order. Throughout the development, Rebellion had published videos about the game, comparing the 1945 Berlin with the game's looks, as well as showcasing the game's AI. Initially, the bullet slow motion effect was more prominent in the game. However, before the game's release, Rebellion adjusted this to only occur during a well-placed sniper shot.

Originally supposed to release in late 2003, the game was then pushed to fall of 2005. In Europe, the Windows and PlayStation 2 versions were released on 30 September 2005, with the Xbox version following on 7 October. In Australia, the Windows, PlayStation 2, and Xbox versions were released on 6 October. In North America, Sniper Elite was released on 18 October for PlayStation 2, Xbox, and Windows. With the release of Xbox 360, Sniper Elite became backward compatible. The Nintendo Wii version of the game was developed by Raylight Studios and published by Reef Entertainment. It was released in North America on 7 December 2010, and Creative Distribution shipped it in the United Kingdom from 10 December. It is compatible with the Wii Remote and Wii Zapper. Sniper Elite was introduced to the Insignia server for Xbox Live in November 2023.

== Reception ==
Reception

Aggregate score
Aggregator	Score
Metacritic	(PC) 76/100 (PS2) 76/100 (Xbox) 77/100 (Wii) 71/100

Review scores
Publication	Score
Computer Gaming World	7/10
Eurogamer	7/10
G4	4/5
Game Informer	7.5/10
GamePro	4/5
GameSpot	7.6 (PC); 7.4 (PS2/Xbox)
IGN	7.6/10
PC Gamer (UK)	75/100

Sniper Elite received "generally favorable" reviews, according to the review aggregator website Metacritic. In a pre-release review, Marc Nix of IGN described its looks and gameplay as similar to the SOCOM franchise, with its shooting elements only being the main difference. The game was awarded "Best PC/Console Game" in the The Independent Game Developers' Association (TIGA) Awards of 2005.

Reviewers had positive opinions on the gameplay. Writing for Eurogamer, Kristan Reed said that compared to other games of the same genre, Sniper Elite forces the player to be tactically aware; Mike Weigand of GamePro had similarly wrote that the player has to be slow and precise. Additionally, Jason Ocampo of GameSpot said that the gameplay is similar to the movie Enemy at the Gates (2001), describing it as fresh and unique, but slower than compared to most games of that genre. Charles Onyett of IGN said that the game's perceived difficulty comes from enemies surprising the player while in cover, which he says "renders most close range combat ineffective". Reed also commended the open-world gameplay, adding that the scoring mechanics make the game more replayale. On the other hand, Di Luo of Computer Gaming World had mixed opinions on the gameplay, but enjoyed it overall due to breaking the norms of similar games. Steve Klett of PC Gamer said that the gameplay's pace is fast, mainly due to the AI system, noting that it is "nearly impossible" to complete the game in a stealth manner.

Missions were received with mixed opinions from reviewers. Greg Mueller of GameSpot said that they were anticlimactic, while also requiring the player to experiment, forcing them replay the same mission several times. The levels, though, were well designed, according to Mueller. Klett said that the missions are varied, but that the objectives are unclear; Stevens said that the overall campaign was interesting. Jeremy Zoss of Game Informer recommended the game to World War II-style games fans. Onyett said that the multiplayer modes make the game more entertaining, while Reed said that whether the game will be fun is up to the number of the players on the server. Klett praised Team Deathmatch modes, noting that it plays smoothly. Luo was disappointed that there was no multiplayer mode for the Windows version. The AI system was well received by reviewers. Mueller wrote that the AI system is sometimes "too intelligent", noting that they run for cover and cooperate with other enemies, while Reed wrote that the AI is far more convincing than other those in other shooting games and that the enemies are intelligent, making the gameplay challening.

Sniping mechanics were also commended by reviewers. Onyett described the slow motion effect as fun, saying that it makes the player wanting to complete more frustrating parts to see the effect again, while Ocampo described the sniping mechanics as very detailed, noting that the player has to calculate their heart rate, breathing, and posture. Tim Stevens of G4 described the sniping mechanics as realistic, noting that the game "requires actual patience" due to the challenging gameplay. Reed praised the overall mechanics of the sniper rifle, saying that the game forces the player to think about how to shoot instead of just lining up the crosshair.

Reviewers had mixed opinions on the game's graphics. While Onyett praised the visual effects of the game, such as sun flares and luminosity across ruined buildings, as well as smaller visual effects, such as fluttering pappers and rats, he said that the Xbox version is much more detailed and vibrant than the PlayStation 2 version. He also criticised the fire and explosion effects, saying that they did not look modern. The ambient environmental effects were commended by Onyett. Mueller's opinion on the graphics for the console version were mixed, describing them as "blurry and ugly", however, the Xbox version is slightly better than the PlayStation 2 one in regards to this. The Windows version's graphics are of higher resolution and contain antialiasing, according to Mueller. Stevens praised the game's environment, but complained about the textures, describing them as blurry, and uniforms, which he saw as blotchy.

The sound system was commended by reviewers. Mueller said that it gives "you the feeling that you're in the middle of a war". Stevens praised the game's sound effects and the soundtrack, while Onyett had mixed opinions on the voice acting.

== Legacy ==
In April 2011, Rebellion announced the next Sniper Elite game, Sniper Elite V2, in collaboration with 505 Games. Released on 1 May 2012, Fairburne returns as the game's main protagonist. Rebellion would work on developing more games in the franchise, such as Sniper Elite III (2014), Sniper Elite 4 (2017), Sniper Elite 5 (2022), and Sniper Elite: Resistance (2025). Spin-off games include Zombie Army Trilogy (2015), Zombie Army 4: Dead War (2020), and Sniper Elite VR (2021). By 2024, the franchise had sold over 20 million copies.
