= Flix Interactive =

British video game developer

- Industry: Video games
- Founded: December 8, 2011; 14 years ago
- Founder: John Tearle; Lee Snookes; Matt Clark
- Headquarters: Birmingham, England
- Number of employees: ~140
- Website: www.flixinteractive.com

Flix Interactive is a British video game developer based in Birmingham, England. Founded by John Tearle, Lee Snookes and Matt Clark in late 2011, Flix Interactive are primarily known as a specialist Unreal Engine development studio, co-developing on games such as Sea of Thieves, Hell Let Loose, Sniper Elite 5, Zombie Army 4: Dead War, Crackdown 3, and Beyond a Steel Sky.

The CEO of Flix Interactive is John Tearle.

== Games ==
Year	Game title	Publisher(s)	Platform(s)	Notes
2025	Mafia: The Old Country	2K Games	Windows, PS5, Xbox Series X/S	Developed by Hangar 13, with co-development support from Flix Interactive
2025	PowerWash Simulator 2	Futurlab	Windows, Switch 2, PS5, Xbox Series X/S	Developed by Futurlab, with co-development support from Flix Interactive
2025	Manor Lords	Hooded Horse	Windows	Developed by Slavic Magic, with co-development support from Flix Interactive.
2024	Pax Dei	Mainframe Industries	Windows	Developed by Mainframe Industries with Flix providing co-development support.
2022	Sniper Elite 5	Rebellion	Windows, PS4, PS5, Xbox One, Xbox Series X/S	Design and development of all DLC Death From Above content pack released April 2023
2021	Hell Let Loose	Team17	Windows, PS5, Xbox Series X/S	Developed by Black Matter, Flix Interactive and Team17, with Flix developing the console version and co-development support on PC
2018	Sea of Thieves	Xbox Game Studios	Windows, Xbox One, Xbox Series X/S	Developed by Rare with support from Flix Interactive, with Flix providing co-development on multiple post-launch updates
2020	Zombie Army 4: Dead War	Rebellion	Windows, Nintendo Switch, PS4, Xbox One	Design and development of all DLC
2020	Beyond a Steel Sky	Revolution Software and Microids	iOS, Linux, MacOS, Windows, Nintendo Switch, PS4, PS5, tvOS, Xbox One, Xbox Series X/S	Developed by Revolution Software with Flix providing co-development support
2020	Worms Rumble	Team17	Windows, Nintendo Switch, PS4, PS5, Xbox One, Xbox Series X/S	Developed by Team17 with Flix providing co-development support
2019	Crackdown 3	Xbox Game Studios	Windows, Xbox One	Developed by Sumo Digital with Flix providing co-development support
2015	Eden Star	Flix Interactive	Windows	Released in early access in 2015.
