= Just Add Water (company) =

British video game developer

Just Add Water (Development) Limited
- Type: Private
- Industry: Video games
- Founded: 24 October 2006; 20 years ago
- Founder: Stewert Gilray
- Headquarters: Leeds, England
- Key people: Rebecca Gilray (Director); Viktorya Hollings (COO); Les Ellis (Studio Head); Phil Jones (Technical Director)
- Products: Gravity Crash; Oddworld; Sniper Elite VR
- Number of employees: 25
- Website: justaddwaterdevelopment.com

Just Add Water (Development) Limited is a British independent video game developer based in Leeds, England. Founded by Stewart Gilray in 2006, Just Add Water has worked on titles for the PlayStation 3 and Windows, notably the Oddworld series. They have teamed up with Oddworld Inhabitants to recreate the series in high definition as well as working on new installments in the series.

== History ==
Just Add Water was founded in 2006 by British career developer Stewart Gilray. The studio worked as a sub-contractor on a number of titles before moving onto its first unique project, Sony-published retro shooter Gravity Crash, in 2008. PS3 and PSP versions released in 2009–2010.

On 16 July 2010, Just Add Water announced they would start work on multiple Oddworld projects after signing a far-reaching contract with Lorne Lanning's Oddworld Inhabitants to develop properties in the Oddworld franchise, a move Gilray describes as a "turning point" for the studio. Oddworld: Stranger’s Wrath HD, a conversion of the 2005 original, was released on 3 September 2010, updating Oddworld: Stranger's Wrath in HD with enhanced 720p visuals, more detailed character models, remastered dialogue, PlayStation Move Support and "additional bonus material."

A collection containing all four original games called the Oddbox was released for Steam service on 20 December 2010. Both Oddworld: Munch's Oddysee and Oddworld: Stranger's Wrath made their debut on Windows PC with updates including Steamworks, which integrated new features including stats and Steam Achievements. It was released in 2010 for PC, then a year later for PS3, and then PlayStation VITA in 2012.

Just Add Water released Oddworld: Stranger's Wrath HD for the PlayStation Network on 21 December in Europe and 28 December in North America. Another HD remake titled Oddworld: Munch's Oddysee HD was released for the PlayStation Network on 19 December in Europe and on 24 December 2012 in North America.

Towards the end of development on Stranger’s Wrath HD, the team moved over to start development on what would become Oddworld: New 'n' Tasty for PS4, Xbox One, PS3, Vita, PC, Mac and Linux.

Oddworld: New 'n' Tasty launched in July 2014 on PS4 to critical acclaim, with other platforms arriving in the months following. The title did well to beat its own 12 month sales prediction within 2 months of release. It had a public showing of pre-alpha footage at Eurogamer Expo 2012. They announced that they were planning to complete Oddworld: Hand of Odd, which is a real-time strategy online game which was halted in the early 2000s, and that it would be released as a free-to-play title. Oddworld Inhabitants have also stated that 'Squeek's Oddysee' is in pre-production phases, with Just Add Water as the developer. In April 2015, Oddworld Inhabitants announced that an all-new remake of Oddworld: Abe's Exoddus is in the planning stages and more information about the project will be announced later.

During this time the company also revisited their title Gravity Crash, by creating a PlayStation Vita version titled Gravity Crash Ultra, which was released in August 2014.

From 2014 through to 2017, Just Add Water worked with new partners and clients, such as Paradox Interactive, Rising Star Games, Bossa Studios & Mike Bithell. This work was focused on porting various projects from PC to console, and assisting development of titles.

In 2017, Just Add Water completed work on Micro Machines World Series for Codemasters and moved into their new office in Leeds city centre, and sought to expand their team to begin work on several new projects.

In 2018, the team grew to 25 strong and began work on titles for Outright Games and Rebellion.

In March 2019, it was announced that Just Add Water would be partnering with Rebellion to release Sniper Elite VR, a standalone VR title for the Sniper Elite series that would be released for PlayStation VR, Oculus VR and Steam VR. Later that year, in October, Ice Age: Scrat’s Nutty Adventure was released, published by Outright Games for PlayStation 4, Xbox One, Switch and PC.

A teaser trailer for Doctor Who: The Edge of Reality was released in October 2020 by Maze Theory, with a release date for 2021.

Sniper Elite VR was released in July 2021, followed by the release of Doctor Who: The Edge of Reality in October of that same year, after a two-week delay for PlayStation 4, Xbox One and PC. The Nintendo Switch version was further delayed to November.

By the end of 2021, Sniper Elite VR won a TIGA award for best VR/AR game. It was also nominated for the Game Awards in the Best VR/AR category.

On 6 January 2022, founder and CEO Stewart Gilray died from COVID-19, at the age of 51.

With a new management team in place, Just Add Water moved into new offices at Platform in Leeds in June 2022.

In November 2023, Rebellion announced a new Sniper Elite VR title in collaboration with Just Add Water. Titled Sniper Elite VR: Winter Warrior, it released later that same month on 30 November 2023.

On 23 April 2024, Wired Productions hosted a virtual showcase for upcoming releases. During this event it was revealed that Wired Productions have been working in partnership with Just Add Water on a new title for VR called DIG VR.

As part of the Dovetail Direct on 20 August 2024, Dovetail Games announced Train Sim World VR: New York in partnership with Just Add Water. This released for Meta Quest on 31 March 2025 after a short delay.

== Games ==
Release date	Titles	Genre	Platform(s)
2009	Gravity Crash	Multidirectional shooter	PlayStation 3, PlayStation Portable
2011	Oddworld: Stranger's Wrath HD	First-person/Third-person action-adventure	PlayStation 3, PlayStation Vita, Windows
2012	Oddworld: Munch's Oddysee HD	Platform	PlayStation 3, PlayStation Vita
2014	Oddworld: New 'n' Tasty!	Side-scrolling, Platform	PlayStation 3, PlayStation Vita, Nintendo Switch, PlayStation 4, Wii U, Windows, OS X, Linux, Xbox One
2014	Gravity Crash Ultra	Multidirectional shooter	PlayStation Vita
2015	I Am Bread	Action-adventure, Simulation	PlayStation 4, Windows, OS X, Xbox One, iOS, Android
2015	Volume	Stealth game	PlayStation 4, PlayStation Vita
2015	Poncho	Platform	PlayStation 4
2016	Lumo	Platform	PlayStation 4, PlayStation Vita, Xbox One
2016	Volume: Coda	Stealth game	PlayStation 4
2017	Micro Machines World Series	Racing	PlayStation 4, Xbox One
2019	Ice Age: Scrat's Nutty Adventure	Platform	PlayStation 4, PlayStation 5, Xbox One, Nintendo Switch, Windows
2021	Sniper Elite VR	Virtual Reality First-Person Shooter	Oculus Quest, PSVR, HTC Vive, Oculus Rift, Valve Index
2021	Doctor Who: The Edge of Reality	Adventure	PlayStation 4, Xbox One, Nintendo Switch, Windows
2021	BPM: Bullets Per Minute	First-person shooter	PlayStation 4, Xbox One, Nintendo Switch
2023	Sniper Elite VR: Winter Warrior	Virtual Reality First-person shooter	Oculus Quest 2, Oculus Quest 3, Oculus Quest Pro
2024	DIG VR	Virtual Reality Simulation	Oculus Quest 2, Oculus Quest 3, Oculus Quest Pro
2025	Train Sim World VR: New York	Virtual Reality Simulation	Oculus Quest 2, Oculus Quest 3, Oculus Quest Pro
