= Death Ray (magazine) =

British magazine

- Editor: Guy Haley
- Categories: Science fiction
- Frequency: Bimonthly
- First issue: May 2007
- Final issue Number: October 2009; 21
- Company: Blackfish Publishing
- Country: United Kingdom
- Language: English
- Website: www.blackfishpublishing.com
- ISSN: 1753-9692

Death Ray was a British magazine devoted to science fiction and fantasy in all its forms, especially media-related topics and novels. It was published every two months, with the first issue going on sale in May 2007. Typical issues were 132 pages, perfect bound, on glossy paper.

== History ==
Death Ray was created by Matt Bielby, the ex-Future Publishing staff member who was editor on some of that company's significant titles, including Total Film magazine and SFX magazine, the dominant SF title. Death Ray is published by Blackfish Publishing, Bielby's magazine company, based in Bath, UK.

At their launches in 2007 Death Ray and SciFiNow, launched April 2007, were the first magazines in recent years to challenge SFX's dominance of the science fiction magazine market in the UK but neither has yet to approach SFX in terms of popularity or sales. (A UK version of the American science fiction magazine Starlog was published for a couple years beginning in May 2000.) However, the magazine has been described by one source as wordier and offering greater depth than its two main competitors.

In August 2008, Blackfish Publishing announced it had been bought by Rebellion Developments, the video game producer who already publish 2000 AD and Abaddon Books. At that point, Death Ray changed to a new format (longer but quarterly) to allow Blackfish to launch other monthly special-interest titles such as Filmstar, though the title is now bimonthly.

In October 2009, it was announced that Death Ray was to cease production, with issue 21 being the last in its run.

== Structure ==
Regular sections of the magazine include: Heat Ray, a news section; New Gods, featuring interviews with current 'hot properties' in science fiction; Deep Thought, with opinion and 'think piece' columns; and Dark Stars, the name of the reviews section, particularly notable for its extensive coverage of books.

== Name ==
Bielby has said that the magazine's name is influenced by a combination of a) the name of the influential 1990s Californian music magazine Ray Gun, b) the name of the Martian 'heat-ray' weapon from H. G. Wells' The War of the Worlds (1898), c) the single issue story 'The Death Ray' from Daniel Clowes' Eightball comic book, d) an Australian comic book from WW2 called The Death Ray, and e) issue 64 of Marvel Comics' The Mighty Avengers, '...Like a Death Ray From the Sky!' (May 1969).
