= Mark Rutherford (composer) =

British composer

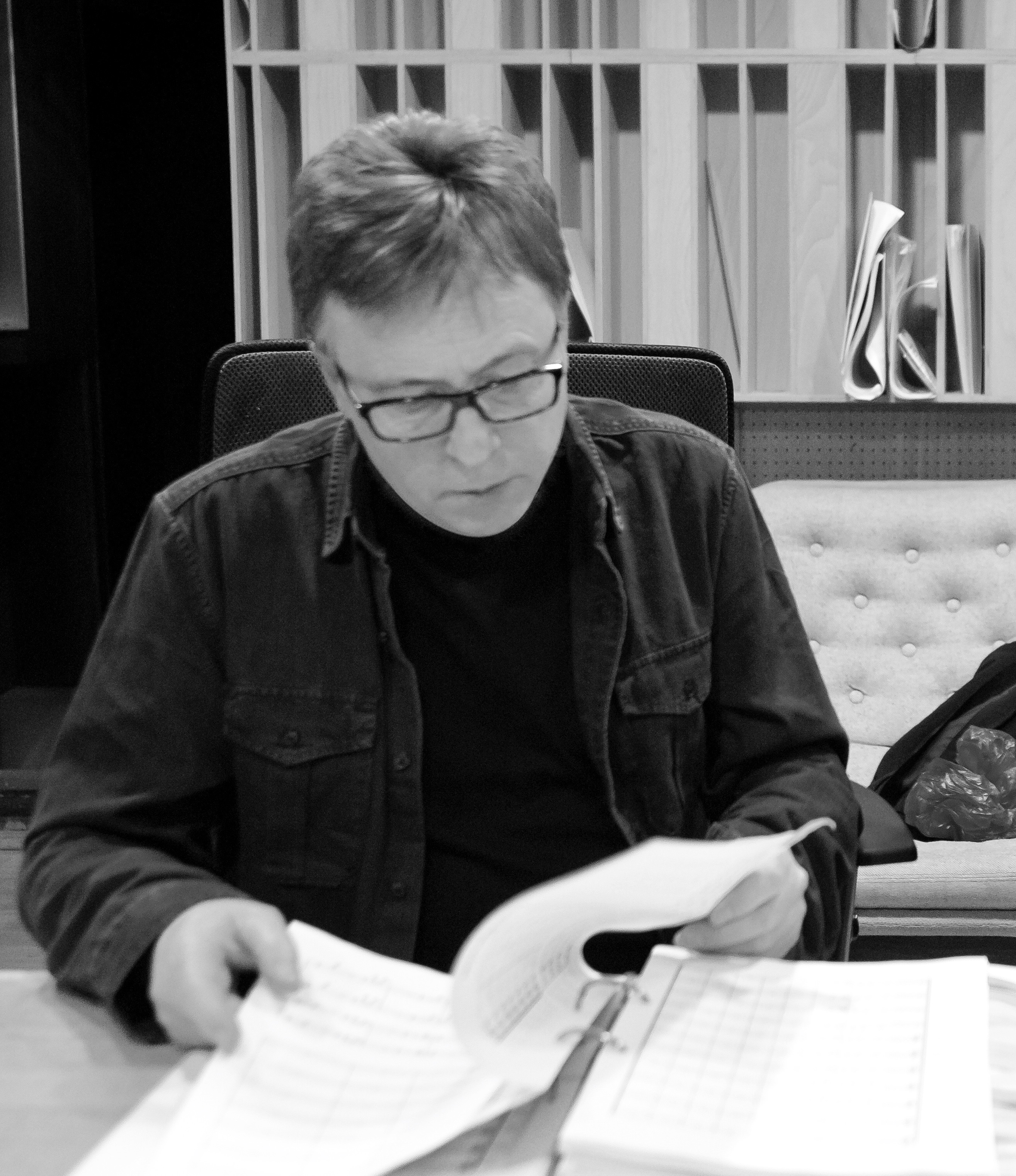
- Rutherford in 2016

Background information
- Also known as: Darkus; Markus Darkus; Markus Rutherford
- Born: Mark Joseph Rutherford
- Origin: London, England
- Genres: Classical, orchestral, electronic, drum and bass, experimental, world
- Occupations: Composer, producer, arranger, musician
- Website: mark-rutherford.com

Mark Joseph Rutherford is a British composer and producer whose work appears on records, video games, television programmes, commercials and feature films.

== Early years ==
From the age of nine, Rutherford studied classical guitar and classical music theory, learning the Segovia Technique under the guidance of tutor Leslie Nicholls (LGSM BA Hons), a former pupil of Adele Kramer. He also learned to play the piano while studying composition and classical music history.

== Career ==
=== Records ===
Rutherford was a guitarist and songwriter with Jimmy the Hoover. The band, managed by Malcolm McLaren, had a top 20 hit, and toured with bands such as Siouxsie and the Banshees and Bow Wow Wow.

He then travelled to Central and Eastern Africa, spending a year and a half living with, and recording, native tribes people. On his return, and under the mentorship of producer Steve Levine, Rutherford learned the techniques of record production, working alongside artists and musicians such as Dave Gilmour, Boy George, Bonnie Tyler, Labi Sifri, Barrington Levy and Motörhead's Lemmy.

In 1991, Rutherford secured a studio space at William Orbit's Guerrilla Studios in Crouch End, London. He shared this with the DJ John Gosling, aka Sugar J. Here, Rutherford collaborated with Orbit on many projects including remixes for Peter Gabriel, The Christians, Psychic TV and Yothu Yindi. He also shared co-production and co-writing credits on Orbit projects including Bassomatic, Strange Cargo and Beth Orton.

Also in 1991, Rutherford began his collaborations with Goldie under the name of Rufige Kru and Metalheads. Their first record, along with DJ Freebase, was "Krisp Biscuit/Killa Muffin", released on Reinforced Records in 1992. This was followed by the "Dark Rider EP", featuring the tracks "Darkrider", "Believe", "Menace" and "Jim Skreech". It was at this time that Goldie gave Rutherford the nickname "Darkus", a reference to the "darker" sound Rutherford had brought to the sound of the EP.

Goldie and Rutherford were then asked by Synthetic Hardcore Phonography Records in Camden to write and produce a new record. This became the first Metalheads track "Terminator". For this track, Rutherford brought an Eventide H3000 Ultra-Harmonizer to the studio, a piece of equipment that he had previously been experimenting with at Steve Levine's studio. The H3000 was able to pitch shift in real time, which was used in "Terminator" to affect the breakbeat while keeping its original tempo.

Goldie and Rutherford wrote and produced three more tracks; "Kemistry", "Knowledge" and "Sinister" for what became the Metalheads' "Terminator EP". This was followed up later with the "Ghosts of My Life/Terminator 2" EP. Many of the Rutherford / Goldie tracks have been re-released and remixed in the years following their original release.

Peter Gabriel then invited Rutherford, alongside DJ Sugar J and Engineer Robert Hill, to create an album using contributions from artists who had gathered at one of Gabriel's "Real World Recording Weeks" at his Real World Studios in Box, Wiltshire. The result was the world music crossover album "Way Down Below Buffalo Hell" by Jam Nation. The album includes contributions from artists including Ayub Ogada, Alex Gifford (Propellerheads), Peter Gabriel, Galliano, Jocelyn Pook, Daniel Lanois, Billy Cobham, Karl Wallinger, Jah Wobble and the late Lucky Dube.

Mike Oldfield invited Rutherford to his studio to work on the album "Songs of Distant Earth". For this, Rutherford used field recordings he had previously made in Africa. Following the release of the album Oldfield asked Rutherford to remix the single "Let There Be Light".

Rutherford also worked with Einsturzende Neubauten after the band's producer Jon Caffery became aware of Rutherford's experimental style of production.

After Rutherford had remixed the single NNNAAAMMM he was invited to rehearse with the band in preparation for their upcoming tour.

=== Video games ===
Rutherford's first game score in 2010 was for Aliens vs. Predator. This was 70 minutes of live orchestral score recorded in Slovakia with the Istropolis Philharmonic Orchestra. For this score, Rutherford made his own percussion kits constructed from bits of metal and various tools which were then scraped and hit with nails, sticks, brushes and mallets.

In 2013, Rutherford composed and produced the live orchestral score for Batman: Arkham Origins. The score was a combination of extreme synthesised elements and full live orchestral score performed by the Bratislava Symphony Orchestra.

2015 saw him scoring Assassin's Creed Chronicles. Rutherford collaborated on the music with Chris Jolley and Aaron Miller. The game is set in three countries, China, India and Russia, and to create these distinctive musical themes Rutherford used the world music experience gained during his time at Peter Gabriel's Real World Studios.

The soundtrack for Dirty Bomb is a combination of processed orchestral elements, electronica and abstract sounds made from a collection of bespoke instruments that Rutherford made. One of the instruments was made from a three-metre steel girder sitting on a galvanised metal box with various straps and bungee cords attached. He used a collection of vintage microphones to record the instrument, including an AKG D12 from the 1960s placed inside a metal box and an AKG D190 from the 1970s.

Rutherford has also composed and produced the scores for the Sniper Elite video game series.

=== Film and television ===
Rutherford's introduction to feature films and TV came when producer Steve Levine offered him the opportunity to work in his studio in London. During this time, his roles were engineering and programming. He also performed as an instrumentalist whilst working on feature films including the award-winning Planes, Trains and Automobiles, Eversmile, New Jersey and Mister Frost.

Following this, Rutherford composed music for the film This Is Not a Love Song, the first film to be streamed on the internet simultaneously with its cinema premiere at London's Leicester Square.

Rutherford's work with writer-director Chris Crow has involved him scoring the feature films Devil's Bridge, Panic Button, A Viking Saga: The Darkest Day and The Lighthouse.

Rutherford's music has also featured in the films Hell's Kitchen, Blood Brothers, Sacred Planet and Peace One Day.

He has also composed music for short films including Fish Can't Fly and Dust. In 2014, he worked on the post-apocalyptic action-satire Get Some.

Rutherford's music can also be heard on television shows and documentaries including Channel 4's Body Shock series, The Twins Who Share a Brain, Horizon, 5th Gear, Minds Eye, Trading Spaces, Perfect Proposal, Visions of the Future, Horizon Space Tourists, Formula One and WWE Smackdown/Raw.

== Selected film scores ==
- This Is Not a Love Song (2002)
- Devil's Bridge
- The Darkest Day
- Dust
- Panic Button (2011)
- Get Some
- The Lighthouse (2016)

== Selected video game scores ==
- Aliens vs. Predator (2010) – Sega
- Assassin's Creed Chronicles – Climax Studios – Ubisoft
- NeverDead – Konami
- Sniper Elite V2 – Rebellion Developments – 505 Games
- LittleBigPlanet PS Vita Marvel Arcade – Sony Interactive Entertainment
- LittleBigPlanet DC Comics – Sony Interactive Entertainment
- Sniper Elite III – Rebellion Developments – 505 Games
- Killzone: Mercenary – Trailer – Guerrilla Games
- Dirty Bomb – Splash Damage
- Batman: Arkham Origins (multiplayer) – Warner Brothers Interactive Entertainment
- Sniper Elite 4 – Rebellion Developments
- Sniper Elite 5 – Rebellion Developments

== Selected discography ==
- William Orbit – Strange Cargo 3William Orbit – Strange Cargo 3
- Steve Levine – Life Aid Armenia
- Mike Oldfield – Songs of Distant Earth
- Peter Gabriel & Carl Wallinger – La Visite Est Terminée
- Peter Gabriel – Mercy Street
- Metalheadz – Dark Rider EP
- Metalheadz – Ghost of My Life EP
- Metalheadz – Krisp Biscuit/Killa Muffin
- Metalheadz – Terminator EP
- Jam Nation – Way Down Below Buffalo Hell
- Arthur Baker – Zone Rock
- Bassomatic – Science & Melody
- Beth Orton – Super Pinky Mandy
- Daniel Lanois – 454
- Einsturzende Neubauten – NNNAAAMMM
- Galliano – Meeting of the People
- Jah Wobble – Prehistoric Gran Prix
- Jane Sibery – Harmonix
- Lucky Dube – First Time
- Psychic TV – God Star
