= Alien Deathstorm =

- Developer: Rebellion Developments
- Publisher: Rebellion Developments
- Producer: Martin Willingham
- Designer: Ben Fisher
- Platforms: Windows; PlayStation 5; Xbox Series X/S
- Release: Spring 2027
- Genre: First-person shooter
- Modes: Single-player, multiplayer

Alien Deathstorm is an upcoming first-person shooter developed and published by Rebellion Developments. The game is set to be released for Windows, PlayStation 5, and Xbox Series X and Series S in 2027.

== Gameplay ==
Alien Deathstorm is a science fiction first-person shooter. In the game, players control an engineer stranded on a colony continuously ravaged by deadly storms and overrun by aliens. The player is equipped with a variety of firearms such as pistols, submachine guns and shotguns, as well as a hammer to defeat enemies. They also have access to a scanner to detect nearby enemies, medical injectors to replenish health, flares, and explosives such as grenades. As players progress, they will find blueprints for weapon attachments that can be added to existing weapons. According to developer Rebellion Developments, the artificial intelligence controlling the enemies will behave dynamically, use the environment to their advantage, and react in accordance with the player's playstyle and the in-game scenarios. According to Rebellion, the game is structured like the Sniper Elite series, in which each mission is set in a sandbox location that can be explored by players. The story campaign also supports two-player cooperative multiplayer.

== Development ==
The game is currently being developed by Rebellion Developments. Rebellion described Alien Deathstorm as an "action horror" game, with the goal of integrating tense exploration and action. The player character is an "engineer" who only received basic weapon training, and the team wanted to evoke the feelings of being hunted by a predator. The storm will also affect gameplay, obscuring visibility, or even damaging the protagonist's suit. As players progress, both the storm and the aliens inhabiting the planet will become more deadly. The team wanted the game to be more replayable and introduced large sandbox locations and dynamic enemy AI that responds to players' actions. The objective system in the game was inspired by Rebellion's own Atomfall. Since the protagonist is an engineer, players use specialized tools to resolve issues across the colony, with mission objectives open to completion in any order. The development team also felt that forcing players to diagnose problems in a hostile environment would heighten the game's tension. Ben Fisher, the head of design, compared the process to solving puzzles in a game. According to Fisher, the game was inspired by "Lovecraftian eldritch horror" and "1980s VHS sci-fi".

Alien Deathstorm was announced in March 2026, and is set to be released for Windows, PlayStation 5 and Xbox Series X and Series S in 2027.
