= Blackfish Publishing =

Former magazine publisher

- Company type: Limited company
- Industry: Magazine Publishing
- Founded: 2006
- Founder: Matt Bielby
- Headquarters: Bath, Somerset, United Kingdom
- Key people: Matt Bielby
- Number of employees: 5+
- Website: Official website
- Footnotes / references dissolution: 7 August 2012

Blackfish Publishing was a magazine publishing company based in Bath, UK. Its first title was Death Ray, a science fiction and fantasy title.

== History ==
Blackfish Publishing was founded in late 2006 by Matt Bielby, best known for his work at Future Publishing, also based in Bath, UK, where he worked on Total Film, PC Gamer and SFX. Blackfish's launches were Death Ray, a science fiction and fantasy title intended to go head-to-head with the runaway market-leader, Future's SFX (which Bielby edited from 1995 to 1996) and Filmstar, a general film magazine in competition with Total Film and Empire. Death Ray launched in May 2007 and Filmstar in May 2009. The company logo was a deep sea angler fish, and the corporate motto was We Go Deeper.

In August 2008 Blackfish Publishing announced that it had been bought by Rebellion, the video-game producer which already published 2000 AD and Abaddon Books. Death Ray was to change to a new format (longer but quarterly) and the changes were to allow Blackfish to launch other monthly special-interest titles.

In October 2009, it was announced that Blackfish Publishing had split from Rebellion and that both Death Ray and Filmstar would cease production. Matt Bielby was quoted as saying:

"I've got some sad news, I'm afraid. Blackfish Publishing is currently in the process of splitting from its parent company, the video game developer and publisher Rebellion, which means that the current issues of Filmstar and Death Ray magazines will, at the very least, be the last for some time."

The company was formally dissolved on 7 August 2012.

== Titles ==
- Death Ray

Filmstar
- Editor: Matt Bielby
- Categories: Film
- Frequency: Monthly
- Circulation: 55,000
- First issue: 28 May 2009
- Final issue Number: October 2009; 5
- Company: Blackfish Publishing
- Country: United Kingdom
- Language: English
- Website: http://www.filmstarmag.com/

- Filmstar was a British magazine devoted to films. Launched on 28 May 2009, Filmstar was the second magazine launched by Blackfish Publishing. It was published monthly and aimed at movie-goers aged 25 and over. Filmstar ended in October 2009 with issue 5.
