= Klustar =

1999 video game

- Cover art
- Developer: Rebellion Developments
- Producer: Infogrames
- Platform: Game Boy Color
- Release: April 1999
- Genre: Puzzle
- Modes: Single-player, Multiplayer

Klustar is a 1999 Game Boy Color game developed by Rebellion Developments and published by Infogrames. Similar to Tetris, the game is a puzzle game requiring the player to manipulate and match patterns on a grid of blocks.

== Gameplay ==
A screenshot of Klustar.

The player controls a klustar of colored blocks that can be moved in four directions and rotated at right angles. In Klustar, colored tetrominoes appear from all sides of the screen and attach to the center. The goal of the game is to match the colors by fitting blocks together by forming squares of at least three blocks with the same color, which disappear. The game continues until the klustar becomes so big it can no longer move, or blocks shapes entering the screen. The game contains two modes: an endurance game that lasts indefinitely, or a 'countdown game' where the aim is to get the highest score with a limited number of matches, with additional types of incoming shapes. The game is scored by the number and size of the paired squares, and the difficulty level set in the game.

== Development ==
Klustar was developed by Chris and Jason Kingsley of Rebellion Developments, and was one of the first titles developed by the pair and the first developed for the Game Boy. The game was designed and owned independently by the duo. Klustar was developed by Rebellion Developments as the first title in four years following a series of unsuccessful developments for the Atari Jaguar. The duo stated "we had always been big fans of the Game Boy and worked on various iterations of the hardware over the years", and had "put together (their) own software tools for the Game Boy from off-the shelf tools".

== Reception ==
Reception

Review scores
Publication	Score
AllGame	4/5
Computer and Video Games	4/5
IGN	6/10
Official Nintendo Magazine	84%
Game Boy Xtreme	67%
N64 Gamer	75%
Planet Game Boy	1/5
Total Game Boy	58%

Klustar received mixed reviews, with many critics assessing the merits of the game in comparison to Tetris. Positive reviews of Klustar considered the game as an innovative interpretation of Tetris. Q64 stated "Klustar is an interesting twist on the Tetris theme, and puzzle fans of this type will want to give Klustar a try". In a milder review, Craig Harris of IGN stated that Klustar was "one of the most unique" interpretations of Tetris, although "it doesn't have the same addictive quality as the original puzzle stacker".

Negative reviews focused upon the overly simplistic design and visual presentation of Klustar. Dave Perrett of Planet Game Boy stated that Klustar was "dull and unnecessary", as the "simple" idea behind the game "doesn't come close to challenging you", particularly once the player "(gets) the hand of how things work". Total Game Boy dismissed the game as a "second-rate version of Tetris", noting the "minimal" presentation and considering that "adding color was a pointless idea". Game Boy Xtreme stated that Klustar "captures little of the excitement of the original".
