= Micro Machines World Series =

2017 video game

- Developer: Codemasters (Note: Ported to PlayStation 4 and Xbox One by Just Add Water.)
- Publisher: Codemasters
- Series: Micro Machines
- Engine: Unity
- Platforms: Linux; OS X; Windows; PlayStation 4; Xbox One
- Release: 30 June 2017
- Genre: Racing
- Modes: Single-player, multiplayer

Micro Machines World Series is a racing video game developed and published by Codemasters for Microsoft Windows, OS X, Linux, PlayStation 4, and Xbox One. The online servers for the game were shut down on 21 March 2024.

== Reception ==
Reception

Aggregate score
Aggregator	Score
Metacritic	(PC) 58/100 (PS4) 59/100 (XONE) 57/100

Review scores
Publication	Score
Destructoid	5/10
Hardcore Gamer	4/5
PlayStation LifeStyle	4.5/10
Hobby Consolas	60%

=== Critical reception ===
Micro Machines World Series received "mixed or average" reviews, according to review aggregator Metacritic, partially due to its lack of career mode and spotty online multiplayer.

Hardcore Gamer awarded it a positive score of 4 out of 5, saying "Micro Machines World Series" is a great buy for anyone who enjoyed prior entries in the series or simply wants a great racing game that the whole family can enjoy". PlayStation LifeStyle awarded it a more negative score of 4.5 out of 10: "This could get fixed into a solid game, but players should be cautious until an overhaul occurs". Hobby Consoles said that the "12 player online mode is not enough to compensate the absence of a career mode, the technical failures and some online design problems (such as the lobby system and menus)".

=== Sales ===
It debuted at number 2 on the UK all format video games sales charts.
