= Eden Star =

- Developer: Flix Interactive
- Publisher: Flix Interactive
- Engine: Unreal Engine 4
- Platform: Windows
- Release: WW: 30 January 2015; (Early access)
- Genres: Action-adventure, survival
- Modes: Single-player, multiplayer

Eden Star (stylized as EDEN STAR) is an action-adventure survival video game developed and published by Flix Interactive. It was released on Steam's early access program on 30 January 2015. The last announcement made by the developers was on 10 January 2020.

As of May 31, 2024, the game is officially abandoned and removed from sale in a near unplayable state.

== Gameplay ==
Eden Star is a combat-style game where players find themselves in an alien, Sci-Fi world.
