= Sniper Elite 4 =

2017 video game

- Developer: Rebellion Developments
- Publisher: Rebellion Developments
- Composer: Mark Rutherford
- Series: Sniper Elite
- Platforms: Microsoft Windows; PlayStation 4; Xbox One; Stadia; Nintendo Switch; iOS; iPadOS; macOS
- Release: Windows, PlayStation 4, Xbox One; 14 February 2017; Stadia; 1 November 2020; Nintendo Switch; 17 November 2020 iOS, iPadOS, macOS; 8 January 2025
- Genres: Tactical shooter, stealth
- Modes: Single-player, multiplayer

Sniper Elite 4 is a 2017 third-person tactical shooter stealth video game developed and published by Rebellion Developments. The sequel to Sniper Elite III, the game was released for Microsoft Windows, PlayStation 4 and Xbox One on 14 February 2017 and for Stadia on 1 November 2020. A Nintendo Switch port of the game was released on 17 November 2020. A sequel, Sniper Elite 5, was released on 26 May 2022.

== Gameplay ==
The player using the X-Ray kill cam system

Sniper Elite 4 is a tactical shooter game with stealth elements, played from a third-person perspective. When the player kills an enemy using a sniper rifle from a long distance, the X-Ray kill cam system will activate, in which the game's camera follows the bullet from the sniper rifle to the target, and shows body parts, bones or internal body organs being broken or ruptured by the bullet. The system has also been expanded to include shrapnel kills, melee kills and stealth kills.

The game's artificial intelligence is improved, with enemies being able to react to the player's action more responsively. When an enemy is killed, other enemies will begin actively looking for them. The player is equipped with a pair of binoculars, which shows the player where the enemies are and what weapons they are carrying, as well as the ability to tag opponents and objects. The game features the "officers" rank. Killing the officer as early as possible will lead his army to retreat, while killing him by the end of a mission will significantly increase the level's difficulty. The player can place traps and use corpses as booby traps. The game also features night missions, in which the player can remove light sources to hide their presence.

Maps in the game are significantly larger than Sniper Elite III, granting players more freedom and open-ended gameplay. The smallest map in Sniper Elite 4 is three times the size of the biggest map in Sniper Elite III. The maps also feature more verticality. The game's new movement system allows Fairburne to climb and grab ledges. Cooperative missions and competitive multiplayer modes are reintroduced.

== Plot ==
Sniper Elite 4 is set in Italy in 1943, in the immediate aftermath of the events in Sniper Elite III. Upon learning about rumours of a new Nazi weapon, the Royal Navy sends a previously captured Italian freighter, the Orchidea, to the island of San Celini to investigate. The ship is quickly sunk by the new weapon – a radio guided anti-ship missile under the development of scientist Andreas Kessler and Heinz Böhm, a high ranking Nazi general that the Allies have little information about. SOE sniper Karl Fairburne (Tom Clarke-Hill) is sent to the island after the sinking and tasked with assassinating General Tobias Schmidt along with several other officers who oversaw the attack, filming it to use as propaganda. After eliminating Schmidt, Fairburne is sent to the village of Bitanti by OSS agent Jack Weaver to find Sofia "Angel" Di Rocco, leader of the local Partisan resistance group. Distrustful of the OSS who allowed her father to be kidnapped by the Nazis, Angel enlists Fairburne to destroy a railway gun at Regelino Viaduct in order to prove himself and convince the group to join forces. After blowing up the viaduct and destroying the gun, Fairburne is sent to investigate a dockyard that the Nazis are using to ship the weapon part out of and call in a bombing raid to destroy the facility.

Upon learning the Sicilian Mafia were helping disrupt operations at the dockyard to slow down the shipment of the weapon parts, Fairburne meets with kingpin Salvatore Dinelli who agrees to provide additional assistance after eliminating Piero Capo, leader of the local Black Brigade. Distrustful of the Mafia's intentions, the Partisans are reluctant to maintain the alliance. However, when an SOE informant, Major Hans Dorfmann, reveals that Kessler is at the Magazzeno Facility where the missiles are assembled, Fairburne infiltrates the base to kidnap Kessler and steal his research notes. On interrogation, Kessler tells Angel her father is still alive, prompting the Partisans to depart to assault the town of Giovi Fiorini and find Böhm's confidant Major Klaus Rothbauer. Kessler then tells Fairburne that he is dying of liver cancer due to his heavy drinking and is of no use to the Nazis or the Allies as a result, and that the information given to Angel was a lie in order to lure the Partisans into a trap. Fairburne departs to Giovi Fiorini and eliminates Rothbauer, but the ensuing battle results in the Partisans being massacred.

Gathered intelligence allows the SOE to discover Böhm is aware of Operation Avalanche and has the constructed missiles sent to his personal fortress at Allagra, intending to both inflict enough damage on the fleet to prevent the invasion of Italy from being a success while additionally attempting to kill General Dwight Eisenhower. Fairburne infiltrates the base, disabling each of the missiles. As he attempts to call in a bombing raid on the facility, Dorfmann appears with a captured Angel, revealing himself to be Böhm. Böhm executes Angel and quickly departs to his advanced jet plane, the Fiegler, intending to take off and personally carry out the attack on Eisenhower's ship. Fairburne gives chase and succeeds in shooting out the plane's engines before it can take off, destroying the plane and killing Böhm just as the Allied Lancaster bombers arrive to destroy the base. In the epilogue scene, Jack offers Karl a job in the OSS and Karl says he will think about it.

== Development ==
Sniper Elite 4 was developed by Rebellion Developments. According to Tim Jones, Rebellion's Head of Creative, the game was designed to be a "sniper paradise". As a result, the team expanded the size and scale of the game's maps and levels to make "real long shots" possible. The animation system, artificial intelligence and the game's rendering technology were also reworked.

505 Games, the publisher of the two previous games, is not involved in the game's production and Sniper Elite 4 will be self-published by Rebellion digitally. Rebellion instead partnered with Sold Out and U&I Entertainment, the publishers and distributors of Zombie Army Trilogy, to produce physical copies of the game. In February 2016, a Chinese digital arts company accidentally revealed the game. Jason Kingsley, CEO of Rebellion, did not confirm the game's existence, and added that they had plans to reveal a new game very soon. Sniper Elite 4 was announced on 7 March 2016.

On 13 June 2016, at E3 2016, it was announced that Sniper Elite 4 was to be released on 14 February 2017.

== Reception ==
Reception

Aggregate score
Aggregator	Score
Metacritic	(NS) 79/100 (PC) 78/100 (PS4) 77/100 (XONE) 81/100

Review scores
Publication	Score
Destructoid	8/10
Easy Allies	3/5 stars
Electronic Gaming Monthly	4/5 stars
Game Informer	7.75/10
GameRevolution	7/10
GameSpot	8/10
GamesRadar+	4/5 stars
Hardcore Gamer	4/5
IGN	8.3/10
Nintendo Life	8/10 stars
Nintendo World Report	8.5/10
PC Gamer (US)	84/100
Polygon	6.5/10
Push Square	7/10 stars
Shacknews	8/10
The Guardian	3/5 stars
VideoGamer.com	7/10

Sniper Elite 4 received "generally favorable" reviews, according to review aggregator website Metacritic.

Nick Plessas of EGM writes about "textbook plot" and "forgettable cast of characters". He praises sniping in the game, as it "takes more nuance and goes deeper than the point-and-shoot mechanics of other titles out there". He notes the enemy soldiers' "tunnel vision, short attention spans, and inconsistent pathfinding", but he feels it is "in service of the overall experience".

Dave Meikleham of PCGamesN also notes poor AI; he notes that he killed a few guards when they had gone to investigate the body of the previous guard, while the last guard should react differently to a pile of corpses. He enjoyed the kill-cam functionality and size of the maps, as well as level design: "each map feels pleasingly fleshed out and alive with possibility", even if he finds minimap "slightly misleading". However, he complains the secondary weapons are "not much fun to fire".

Michael Huber of EasyAllies both notes "paper-thin plot" and admits it has "a few interesting elements like an uneasy alliance with the Mafia". While he felt the rifles in the game "are undoubtedly the most engaging weapons to use" he also felt about pistols and sub-machine guns that "there's an unshakable sense of emptiness to them".

Game Informer's Brian Shea enjoyed both using sniper rifle and secondary weapons, as well as gadgets like trip-mines. He also praised kill-cam. However, he took issue with the sound design, stating that while artillery guns mask the sound of the rifle, nearby gunfights do not.

The Guardian's Sam White praised sniping and varied environments. He enjoyed many ways of approaching a target. In his opinion, AI was improved, when compared to the previous installment.

Josh Tolentino of Destructoid enjoyed the HUD-like assists the game offers and noted their usage makes the game more tactical. He also appreciated kill-cam and seemed to be glad it is also present while killing with a trap or using a melee attack. However, he found the narrative disappointing and called the story "a missed opportunity".

Eurogamer ranked the game 40th on their list of the "Top 50 Games of 2017", while GamesRadar+ ranked it 22nd on their list of the 25 Best Games of 2017.

=== Sales ===
In June 2016, Sold Out described the game as a "big hitter", and that they expected the game to sell approximately 200,000 physical copies on its launch day in the United Kingdom.

=== Accolades ===
Year	Award	Category	Result	Ref.
2017	Develop Awards	Music Design	Nominated	
2017	Develop Awards	Sound Design	Nominated	
2017	The Independent Game Developers' Association Awards	Visual Design	Won	
2017	The Independent Game Developers' Association Awards	Action and Adventure Game	Nominated	
2017	Golden Joystick Awards	Best Audio	Nominated	
2018	14th British Academy Games Awards	British Game	Nominated	
