= Atomfall =

- Developer: Rebellion Developments
- Publisher: Rebellion Developments
- Designer: Chinmay Zende
- Programmer: Richard May
- Artist: Ryan Greene
- Writer: Jonathan L. Howard
- Composer: Graham Gatheral
- Platforms: PlayStation 4; PlayStation 5; Windows; Xbox One; Xbox Series X/S
- Release: 27 March 2025
- Genres: Action, survival
- Mode: Single-player

Atomfall is a 2025 action survival game developed and published by Rebellion Developments. It is set in an alternative history 1960s where the Windscale nuclear disaster turned much of the north west of England into a radioactive quarantine zone. The game was released for PlayStation 4, PlayStation 5, Windows, Xbox One, and Xbox Series X/S on 27 March 2025. It received mixed reviews from critics.

== Gameplay ==
Atomfall is an action game played from a first-person perspective. It is set in an alternate history in which the 1957 Windscale fire covered much of the Lake District, Cumberland in radioactive fallout. Players can collect various resources and scraps to craft weapons, or use firearms to defeat enemies, though ammunition is scarce in the game. While Atomfall is billed as a survival game, players only need to manage the player character's health and heart rate. Combat, sprinting and kicking enemies will increase the protagonist's heart rate, resulting in darkened vision and muffled hearing. Stealth tactics can be used, and the game can be completed without killing any enemy. Killing all characters in the game is also an option.

The English countryside of the Lake District is a series of interconnected areas which can be freely explored. Players must interact with other non-playable characters and select dialogue options as responses. Players will eventually acquire leads which will lead to new objectives and opportunities. Objectives can be pursued in any order after they are unlocked.

== Plot ==
=== Setting ===
Shortly after World War II, a slate mining operation in the Lake District discovered a meteorite dubbed 'Oberon'. The British government established the British Atomic Research Division (BARD) and built the Windscale nuclear plant on top of the site both to mask the true nature of the discovery and to power the network of bunkers and research facilities in the region. A massive interconnected bunker called the Interchange acted as BARD’s center of operations and entry point into the Oberon site. Research into the Oberite mineral and the alien contents within Oberon produced massive technological leaps such as the atomic battery and the training stimulant.

On 10 October 1957, an incident (implied to be caused by both internal negligence and foreign sabotage) in the Oberon site launched an energy surge that destroyed the Windscale plant, scattering radioactive and alien contaminants in the region as well as creating an interference field that disrupt electrical components (such as aircraft) and blocked all signals into and out of the area. The British government quickly enacted a quarantine around Wyndham village, a small settlement across a lake from the Windscale plant, and then to the wider region.

=== Characters ===
Those who are left inside the Quarantine and interference field were left to fend off for themselves. The trapped remnants of the military reorganised themselves as Protocol under leadership of Cpt. Grant Sims. Protocol enacted strict martial law in Wyndham village and runs the underground Skethermoore Prison. A group of infected individuals, claiming to “hear the Voice in the Soil” organised into Druids. The Druids are secretly led by Mother Jago, a herbalist in Casterfell Woods, who seeks to embrace Oberon’s influence on Earth.

Other characters that may influence the ending includes Joyce Tanner, a member of a convoy sent from the outside world; Dr. Alan Holder, the sole surviving scientist from the Interchange who’s looking for ways to kill Oberon; and Dr Garrow, BARD’s head scientist who enacted and escaped the quarantine but later returned to pursue her research on Oberon and subsequently got imprisoned by Protocol.

More characters also act as quest givers and/or traders that can influence the story but not the overall ending such as Iris Baxter, the village baker looking for a remedy for her infected husband; Alf Buckshaw, the owner of the Grendel’s Head pub who plans to rebel against Protocol; and Vicar McHenry who’s aiding Dr. Moore in the church cellar to help him against the ever-enroaching Druids belief.

=== Story ===
The Player is awakened by a wounded scientist in bunker L8 of Slatten Dale, Cumberland with no memory of themselves or what has happened. The wounded scientist reveals that the quarantine has been in effect for 5 years now and urges the player to reach the Interchange by giving him his keycard that can open the blast doors into the facility. Shortly after exiting the bunker, the player encounters a red telephone box where a mysterious voice tells them that “Oberon must die”. Upon reaching the Interchange, it becomes apparent that the destruction of Windscale Plant means the facility’s data centers require another source of power: atomic batteries, and a means to redirect the signals to the control room.

During their exploration to find ways to escape the quarantine and answers to what has transpired in the region, the player may encounter key characters that can influence the ending. The player can choose to follow or disobey orders given by them or even kill them outright, but following a key character always results in disobeying the others. Ultimately, the player collects enough atomic batteries by scavenging, from defeating robots or through trade, and obtains the signal redirector from Skethermoor Prison to power up the Interchange and unlock access to Oberon site underneath the Windscale plant.

Entering the dig site, the player may harvest a sample of Oberon before either destroying it using explosives or poison, or enrich it with growth stimulant, according to the orders given from a key character. This may result in Oberon dying with the player escaping the quarantine or getting kidnapped, or Oberon growing stronger and the player becoming one with the Voice in the Soil.

== Development ==
Atomfall was developed by British developer Rebellion Developments. The game was inspired by Fallout: New Vegas, which was described by Ben Fisher, associate head of design at Rebellion, as a "dense" experience and one that valued player choice. Instead of building a single large open world area, Rebellion opted to build several smaller but interconnected zones due to the team's expertise in crafting maps of similar size, having worked on the Sniper Elite series. Metro and BioShock also influenced the game design. However, unlike these games, investigative gameplay was prioritised by Rebellion in an attempt to promote players' freedom and facilitate world-building.

Fisher described it as a "desperate" survival game. Both the player character and enemies in the game are easily killed. The team compared the gameplay to the film Children of Men, in which players assume control of an everyman instead of a skilled fighter. Pulp fiction also influenced the game, with The Quatermass Experiment, The Prisoner, Doctor Who, The Wicker Man and The Day of the Triffids cited as the team's inspirations.

== Release ==
Rebellion Developments announced Atomfall in June 2024. The game was released for PlayStation 4, PlayStation 5, Windows, Xbox One, and Xbox Series X/S on 27 March 2025. It was made available at launch to PC Game Pass and Xbox Game Pass Ultimate subscribers at no additional cost.

A story expansion pack titled Wicked Isle was released on 3 June 2025. A second story expansion titled The Red Strain was released on 16 September 2025.

== Reception ==
Reception

Aggregate scores
Aggregator	Score
Metacritic	(PC) 72/100 (PS5) 74/100 (XSXS) 73/100
OpenCritic	64% recommend

Review scores
Publication	Score
Digital Trends	2.5/5
Eurogamer	3/5
Famitsu	31/40
Game Informer	7/10
GameSpot	7/10
GamesRadar+	4.5/5
Hardcore Gamer	2.5/5
IGN	8/10
PC Gamer (US)	62/100
PCGamesN	8/10
Push Square	8/10
Shacknews	9/10
The Guardian	3/5
VG247	3/5

Atomfall received "mixed or average" reviews, according to review aggregator website Metacritic. OpenCritic determined that 64% of critics recommended the game. In Japan, four critics from Famitsu gave the game a total score of 31 out of 40.

On 1 April 2025, Rebellion announced that Atomfall had reached 1.5 million players, making it the company's most successful launch.

The game was nominated for Innovation in Accessibility at The Game Awards 2025, and won for Best British Game at the 22nd British Academy Games Awards. The Red Strain was nominated for Best Game Expansion at the Golden Joystick Awards 2025.

== In other media ==
Game writer Jonathan L. Howard wrote a related comic strip which appeared in the Judge Dredd Megazine from April to July 2025. A second story titled "The Wicked Isle", again written by Howard, appeared in May to July the following year.

A television adaptation of the video game is being developed as a co-production between Two Brothers Pictures and Rebellion. Harry and Jack Williams will write the TV drama, as reported by Deadline in April 2026.

A novel, Atomfall: The Omega Order by James Lovegrove, was published by Rebellion in 2026.
