= Matt Bielby =

British magazine editor (born 1965)

- Matt Bielby in Bath, 2007
- Born: 1965 (age 60–61); Huddersfield, West Yorkshire
- Education: Bradford Grammar School
- Occupation: Magazine editor

Matt Bielby is a magazine editor based in the UK. He is best known for launching and editing many successful titles in assorted markets during the 1990s, mostly on the subjects of computer and video games, and film and television. These include .net, Amiga Power, Super Play and PC Gamer.

== Biography ==
=== Early life ===
Bielby was born in Huddersfield, West Yorkshire, in 1965, and spent most of his early life in Bradford, West Yorks, where he attended Bradford Grammar School.

=== Career ===
Developing an interest in journalism, and magazines in particular, he was film editor of the University of Nottingham student newspaper, Impact, before getting a job at Emap in London in February 1988, as staff writer on Computer and Video Games magazine. By the end of 1988 he was deputy editor of Your Sinclair magazine at Dennis Publishing, also in London, and became editor in early 1989.

In 1990 Bielby moved to Bath, when Your Sinclair was bought by Bath-based Future Publishing, and there he became part of Future's growth during the 1990s. There, Bielby launched the computer games magazine Amiga Power (1991), the Nintendo video games magazine Super Play (1992), the computer games magazine PC Gamer (1993), the internet magazine .net (1994), the SF and fantasy magazine SFX (1995), the movie magazine Total Film (1996), the computer and video game magazine Arcade (1998), and the video game magazine Official UK PlayStation 2 Magazine (2000). Most of these titles became the best sellers in their particular markets, with the exception of Total Film, which established itself as the No.2 title in its market, after Emap's Empire.

After leaving Future in 2001, Bielby worked as a freelance journalist at assorted companies, including Emap, Future, and Highbury House, usually in the development of new projects. One of these went on to become Zoo (2004), EMAP's weekly men's magazine.

==== Blackfish Publishing ====
In 2006, Bielby launched his own publishing company, Blackfish Publishing, which published the magazines Death Ray and Filmstar. Death Ray was a science fiction and fantasy title, created as a rival to Future Publishing's market-leading SFX. Bielby repeatedly talks positively about SFX throughout the first issue of Death Ray. Death Ray ceased publication in October 2009.
