= Sniper Elite: Resistance =

- Developer: Rebellion Developments
- Publisher: Rebellion Developments
- Producer: Steve Archer
- Designer: Ben Fisher
- Programmer: Matthew Hayward
- Artists: Ric Turner; Martin Carter
- Writers: Giles Armstrong; Maria Chaudhary
- Composer: Mark Rutherford
- Series: Sniper Elite
- Platforms: PlayStation 4; PlayStation 5; Windows; Xbox One; Xbox Series X/S
- Release: 30 January 2025
- Genres: Tactical shooter, stealth
- Modes: Single-player, multiplayer

Sniper Elite: Resistance is a 2025 third-person tactical shooter game developed and published by Rebellion Developments. A continuation of the Sniper Elite series, the game was released for PlayStation 4, PlayStation 5, Windows, Xbox One and Xbox Series X/S on 30 January 2025. It received mixed reviews from critics.

== Gameplay ==
As with its predecessors, Sniper Elite: Resistance is a third-person shooter. Each level is a large, open area free to explore, and there are often multiple ways for players to approach their objectives. Players can use stealth tactics to bypass enemies, explore the map to find alternate routes, or use lethal firearms to kill enemies. Weapons can be extensively customized. Players can overhear conversations from non-playable characters or explore locations thoroughly to discover novel ways to assassinate their targets. The game features optional quests that players can complete. When the player kills an enemy using a sniper rifle from a long distance, the X-Ray kill cam system activates, in which the camera follows the bullet from the sniper rifle to the target, and shows body parts, bones or internal body organs being broken or ruptured by the bullet.

The campaign can be played solo or online with another player cooperatively. The game introduces "Propaganda Mode", which tasks players to complete time-based combat challenges as an unnamed resistance fighter. These missions are unlocked through collecting propaganda posters in the main game. Invasion, the asymmetrical multiplayer mode introduced in Sniper Elite 5, returns in Resistance. The game supports a 16-player competitive multiplayer mode.

== Story ==
Sniper Elite: Resistance features a new lead character, Harry Hawker, in a story set in 1944 within German-occupied France. Hawker previously appeared in the cooperative multiplayer mode of Sniper Elite 3, 4 and 5 as the second playable character. The story of Resistance takes place alongside the events in Sniper Elite 5. The plot shows Hawker put against a mysterious new threat known as the Wunderwaffe.

The campaign begins with the British attempting to bomb a dam in Nazi occupied France, and failing due to AA guns. Hawker is dispatched to neutralise the guns. Once this is completed, Hawker exfiltrates as the dam is blown up, and returns to his original mission of tracking down local resistance forces.

After locating the local resistance, Hawker infiltrates the town of St. Raymond, a city overrunning with Gestapo forces, with the mission to locate a dead drop left by a mid-rank officer known as Vertigo, who was in contact with the resistance before his disappearance. Coded documents are discovered that, when decrypted, show intel about a secret Nazi superweapon project. After infiltrating a Gestapo-controlled hotel and train station in the Lyonese district of Fourvière, Hawker finds out the weapons are a form of a deadly nerve agent known as Kleine Blume.

The dam from the first mission is being repaired by the Germans. One of the crashed RAF bombers has an operational bouncing bomb, which the Germans are studying. Hawker eliminates all scientists and destroys the technology, preventing mass production of the bouncing bomb.

The trail leads him to a Kleine Blume production facility near the southern coast of France, where he finds a way to neutralize the facility. Hawker prepares an assault on Fort Rouge, where he discovers that Kleine Blume is being shipped to a "Vallee des Dieux".

Infiltrating the Vallee des Dieux chateau based on the intel from the previous attack on Fort Rouge, Harry uncovered a V1 rocket launch site, which the Allies believed is how the Kleine Blume is being deployed by, only to discover a secret facility hidden underneath the chateau, where it is revealed that the weapon would be delivered by a different superweapon: the Zugwerfer, a form of train-mounted artillery to launch the special warheads. There are five in total, three have already left for Amiens. He destroys the lone Zugwerfer he finds in the chateau railyard and heads for Amiens.

Once in Amiens, Hawker finds out that when he finishes his mission by trapping the Zugwerfers for an RAF bombing, he will not be able to escape in time. As he stands on the railing of a tunnel and ponders his impending death, a stray Zugwerfer appears, carrying the remaining crates of Kleine Blume and the head of Special Committee C, a rogue Nazi faction unknown to even the highest levels of the Reich's leadership: Obergruppenführer Otto Kruger.

Hawker jumps onto the roof of the train just as it enters the tunnel. The RAF bomber drops its bomb at the entrance of the tunnel, forcing the train to crash. Kruger survives the crash and hijacks a motorbike after killing two German soldiers to erase any evidence. Just as Kruger tries to make his escape, Hawker gets on the balcony of a station and takes a shot, killing Kruger. Hawker then reunites with his allies, who informs him there might be another mission soon.

For the DLC missions:

In the DLC mission "Lights Camera Acthung", Hawker heads to the Ville du Lac Film Studios, where Adolf Hitler is supposed to star in a series of propaganda films. Hawker eliminates Hitler and exfiltrates the studios.

In the DLC mission Vercors Vendetta, Hawker heads to the Vercors Massif and learns that not only has an attempted Resistance uprising has been thwarted, but that the very last reserves of Kleine Blume are stored there. He simultaneously destroys the final store in a cave while simultaneously stopping Nebelwerfer suppression on the Resistance hiding out in the surroundings.

In the DLC mission Striking Range, Hawker is now in the town of Theoule-sur-Mer. He learns that his Resistance ally Carillon attempted to sabotage another V1 rocket launch site, but failed and was captured. Hawker checks the city jail, learning of Carillon's successful escape, while destroying the V1 launch site.

Finally, in the DLC mission Mud and Thunder, he goes to the Baie des Veys after a Resistance contact informs the Allies of a V-2 rocket launch site. Hawker finds the contact has been killed by the Nazis when his car got stuck in the mud. He sabotages a radio that guides the rockets, before using one of the rockets from the main launch site to destroy the second launch site. With southern France finally liberated, France is about to wake up from the nightmare of Nazi occupation.

== Development ==
According to Rebellion, Sniper Elite: Resistance is around the same size as Sniper Elite 5. The game retained the same gameplay systems, though the team added some features, such as a grenade type and a timed-based mode. While Sniper Elite 5 included updates set in Vichy France, the team decided to make a standalone game set in this location because the team "felt that there was much more to explore". "Spy Academy", a level in Sniper Elite 5 which received critical acclaim from critics, serves as an inspiration for the level designers in Resistance.

== Release ==
Sniper Elite: Resistance was announced by Rebellion Developments in August 2024 at Gamescom. The game was released for PlayStation 4, PlayStation 5, Windows, Xbox One and Xbox Series X/S on 30 January 2025. It was made available at launch to PC Game Pass and Xbox Game Pass Ultimate subscribers at no additional cost.

Continuing series tradition, a "Kill Hitler" DLC level was released as an extra purchase at launch.

== Reception ==
Reception

Aggregate scores
Aggregator	Score
Metacritic	(PC) 70/100 (PS5) 75/100 (XSXS) 72/100
OpenCritic	59% recommend

Review scores
Publication	Score
Digital Trends	3.5/5
Eurogamer	4/5
Famitsu	32/40
GameSpot	6/10
GamesRadar+	4/5
Hardcore Gamer	4/5
IGN	6/10
PC Gamer (US)	74/100
Push Square	7/10
Shacknews	8/10

Sniper Elite: Resistance received "mixed or average" reviews from critics for the PC and Xbox Series X/S versions, while the PlayStation 5 version received "generally favorable" reviews, according to review aggregator website Metacritic. In Japan, four critics from Famitsu gave the game a total score of 32 out of 40, with each critic awarding the game an 8 out of 10.

GameSpot rated the game 6/10, crediting the game's mode variety and gameplay mechanics but criticizing the lack of innovation and the new "propaganda" missions.
