= Sniper Elite VR =

- Developer: Just Add Water
- Publisher: Rebellion Developments
- Series: Sniper Elite
- Engine: Unity
- Platforms: Oculus Quest; Microsoft Windows; PlayStation 4
- Release: 8 July 2021
- Genres: Tactical shooter, stealth
- Mode: Single-player

Sniper Elite VR is a 2021 virtual reality video game developed by Just Add Water and published by Rebellion Developments. The player plays as an elite sniper in the Italian resistance. The game was released for Oculus Quest, Microsoft Windows and PlayStation 4. The game is part of the Sniper Elite series.

== Gameplay ==
The gameplay of Sniper Elite VR is similar to previous titles in the series. The player explores an open level and take out targets from afar, using weaponry to take out Nazi soldiers they find along the way. The player can try to maintain stealth or go into open combat. When the player gets a long distance kill, an x-ray cam will activate that shows the enemy being killed. Additionally sniper rifles, can function as melee weapons that the player can use to silently take out enemies. The player gets score bonuses for getting environmental kills and use sounds from the environment to mask gunshots. The player can hold the offhand trigger in order to go into slow motion, where a reticle is displayed that makes it easier to hit shots. The game has save points where the player respawns if killed.

== Development ==
Development on the game started after work ended on Rebellion's previous title, Battlezone. On discussing the major challenges the team faced, a developer said "Players are used to these large, free-flowing levels that look incredible. Making it look that good and keep up a reasonable frame rate is a challenge." The studio developed AI specifically for VR to make the enemies feel realistic to the player. Different control schemes were a focus due to the various headsets they had to support. The journey of the bullet for the series' killcam was modified in order to avoid making the player dizzy with the quick motion.

The game focused on avoiding assigning actions to buttons and instead making it a motion, like steadying the scope and preparing grenades. Sniping was designed to need technique to hit long shots, to make sure the player couldn't breeze though levels. Sniper Elite VR originally had a fully mechanical reload system, where players needed to load individual bullets into the gun, but it led to confusion if the gun was loaded or not. The team balanced adding UI to inform the player and trying to avoid too much as to not immerse the player in the Italian setting.

== Reception ==
Reception

Aggregate score
Aggregator	Score
Metacritic	(PC) 68/100 (PS4) 76/100

Review scores
Publication	Score
IGN	6/10
Push Square	8/10

Sniper Elite VR received "generally favorable reviews" to "mixed or average reviews" according to Metacritic.

IGN's Gabriel Moss gave the game a 6 out of 10, criticizing the story as "thin" and "poorly told and even more poorly paced" but praised the gameplay with its "features enjoyable arcade-style combat".

== Sequel ==
A second VR game based on the Sniper Elite series, Sniper Elite VR: Winter Warrior, was released by Rebellion on November 30, 2023 for Meta Quest 2, Meta Quest 3, and Meta Quest Pro.
