= Sniper Elite V2 =

2012 video game

- Developer: Rebellion Developments
- Publisher: Rebellion Developments
- Composer: Mark Rutherford
- Series: Sniper Elite
- Platforms: Microsoft Windows; PlayStation 3; Xbox 360; Wii U; Nintendo Switch; PlayStation 4; Xbox One
- Release: Microsoft Windows, PlayStation 3, Xbox 360: NA: 2 May 2012; AU: 3 May 2012; EU: 4 May 2012; Wii U: NA: 21 May 2013; EU: 24 May 2013; AU: 30 May 2013; Microsoft Windows, Nintendo Switch, PlayStation 4, Xbox One: WW: 14 May 2019 (Remastered)
- Genres: Tactical shooter, stealth
- Modes: Single-player, multiplayer

Sniper Elite V2 is a 2012 third-person tactical shooter stealth video game developed and published by Rebellion Developments. It is the sequel to 2005's Sniper Elite, which takes place in the same timeframe and location—the Battle of Berlin in April and May 1945—but with an altered narrative. The game's story follows an American OSS officer who must eliminate a group of scientists involved in the German V-2 rocket program before the Red Army captures them. A sequel named Sniper Elite III was released in 2014. A remastered version for Microsoft Windows, Nintendo Switch, PlayStation 4, and Xbox One was released on May 14, 2019.

== Gameplay ==
If a successful sniper kill shot is made, the "Kill-Cam" shows the camera following the bullet from the rifle to the target, with its entry and exit in X-Ray vision.

Sniper Elite V2 is a third-person tactical shooter that emphasizes a less direct approach to combat, encouraging players to use stealth and keep their distance from enemy soldiers. Most single-player campaign missions provide multiple routes for the player to take, including multi-story buildings and side streets, to get vantage points and hide from pursuing enemies. Set in World War II, the player character utilises appropriate weapons for the era. The sniper rifle is the primary weapon throughout the game, with a variety of submachine guns and pistols available as side arms. In addition to hand grenades, the player can deploy tripwire booby traps, anti-infantry land mines, and dynamite. Binoculars can be used to tag enemies in view, displaying their position and movements to the player. When using the sniper rifle, certain elements can determine the outcome of a shot, taking realistic ballistics into consideration such as wind direction and strength and bullet drop, potentially altering the shot through the scope. Bullets can ricochet off surfaces or targets and strike others. Different postures, like crouching or lying down on the front, can also steady a shot, and the player character can also take a deep breath, which, from their perspective, seems to slow down time. Another key ability is that when the player character is spotted, their last movements and position to the enemy are shown as a white-outlined figure, potentially allowing the player to escape that area while enemy soldiers fire at the wrong target.

A major feature of V2 is the "X-Ray Kill Cam," where a successful and skilled shot will be followed in slow motion from the bullet shooting out of the sniper rifle to the target, where upon impact, the player will be shown an anatomically correct X-ray style reveal of the body part being hit and the damage the bullet causes to the target's organs and bones. Sniping can also be used to shoot the enemies' grenades, killing them and anyone nearby. This method can also be used against military vehicles by targeting fuel tanks and valves, and can even detonate fuel canisters and artillery shells marked with red paint. The game will also measure notable shots by briefly displaying distance and other factors like whether it was a head-shot or moving target.

=== Multiplayer ===
V2 supports online multiplayer where players engage in cooperative play in a series of game modes. Kill Tally is a mode where two players fend off increasingly numerous and difficult waves of enemy soldiers and vehicles in an enclosed environment with an infinite supply point of ammunition and explosives. While players can compete for higher kill counts, both must keep each other alive and work together. Bombing Run is a mission based mode where players must search the environment in order to repair a truck to escape before the entire area is bombed. The third mode is Overwatch, where two players take different roles to complete an objective with one player as the operative who undertakes said objectives and is armed with short range firearms and binoculars that can be used to tag enemies for the second player, who takes the role of a sniper who covers the operative throughout. In addition to these separate game modes, missions from the single player campaign can also be played with two players. The Wii U version of the game, however, omits multiplayer, leaderboard and co-op modes.

== Plot ==
The protagonist is U.S. Army Second Lieutenant Karl Fairburne (Tom Clarke-Hill), a German-American OSS operative and skilled sniper who is inserted into Berlin in 1945, during the final days of World War II. The game starts with Fairburne discussing Operation Paperclip and its predecessor, Operation Overcast, as the United States makes an effort to recruit the top scientific personnel of Nazi Germany with offers of employment. Fairburne is tasked with tracking down key individuals involved with the development of the V-2, which pits him against both the fanatical German forces defending Berlin and the invading Soviet forces who are eager to recruit the scientists to their side.

The campaign's first mission has Fairburne assassinating German Major-General Hans von Eisenberg as he meets with a Soviet agent to defect to Russia. He escapes, and is given a new target: Dr. Gunther Kreidl, an expert in rocket engines who is being escorted out of the city in a military convoy. After laying an ambush, Fairburne eliminates Kreidl and obtains documents revealing the location of Germany's primary V-2 production facility, where Kreidl's three colleagues are hiding. Fairburne infiltrates the facility and destroys it with C-3, but finds no trace of the scientists. However, he overhears a radio message revealing that one of his targets, Dr. Efram Schwaiger, has been caught trying to defect to the American side, and was now being held at a detainment camp at the Opernplatz.

Ordered to secure Schwaiger as a valuable asset instead of killing him, Fairburne begins making his way towards the Opernplatz. To distract the Germans, he locates a cache of explosives and destroys a bridge, provoking the Soviets into attacking a German garrison at an abandoned museum. As expected, German reinforcements arrive to defend the position, allowing Fairburne to slip by during the ensuing chaos. He then infiltrates a military camp at the Opernplatz, saves Schwaiger from execution in the nick of time, and provides covering fire as the scientist flees to safety, before holding off a detachment of Soviet troops sent to capture him. Schwaiger is mortally wounded in the process, however, and with his dying words states that "Wolff has a plan" involving someone or something called "Tabun". Unsure of what to make of this information, Fairburne proceeds with his mission and hunts down his fourth target, Oberst (Colonel) Müller, whom he kills with a long-distance shot from atop a flak tower during an air raid on Berlin.

To locate his last target, Dr. Wolff, Fairburne raids a Soviet special operations command post in East Berlin. There he obtains intel revealing that "Tabun" is a powerful and lethal nerve agent, and that Wolff has masterminded a plan to help Soviets load the last of Germany's V2 rockets with it and launch them at London, with the intention of later making the attack look Germany's final act of revenge. Deciding to postpone Wolff's assassination and prioritize stopping the V2 launch, Fairburne begins to look for clues regarding the location of the launch site. His search leads him to Wolff's private office near the German Ministry of War, where he finds a notebook revealing Wolff's plan to escape aboard a Soviet airplane and a tattered map detailing the locations of all V-2 storage facilities and launch sites, of which only one is still operational – and in Soviet occupied territory. Arriving at the launch site just as the Soviets are fueling one of the rockets for the attack, Fairburne destroys it by detonating its fuel supply. He then fights his way back to the Brandenburg Gate, where only a few days earlier he had assassinated von Eisenberg, and where Wolff is about to escape with a Soviet escort. With a single, desperate shot from the top of the structure, Fairburne critically injures Wolff as he's speeding away, causing his car to swerve and flip over. As the Battle of Berlin comes to an end, Fairburne remarks that while World War II may be over, a new conflict is just beginning, and that his actions have made him its first soldier.

== Development ==
In 2011, Rebellion announced that it was co-publishing the title with 505 Games. Due for release in May 2012, the game was described as a "reboot" of the original Sniper Elite, rather than a sequel. The initial announcement however only referred to a release on the Xbox 360 and PlayStation 3, absent a PC version. Following a strong response from PC users, Rebellion announced it was to self-publish a PC version through shops and via the Steam online games download retailer to be released at the same time as the console versions. On 5 February 2013, Rebellion announced a version for Nintendo's Wii U console is in development.

Following the initial release, a second retail version of the game was released for the PC only called the "High Command Edition" on 12 October 2012. This version included an updated version of original V2 game, the previous pre-order bonus "Assassinate the Fuhrer", new multiplayer maps and mode updates and a then previously unreleased new single player mission and weapons. Many of the features would be later released online separately. The PC version was released for a third time on 15 March 2013 as part of the "Collector's Edition", this time including the original game, all downloadable content released up to that date (both single and multiplayer), an audio soundtrack, printed full-colour art book and the original Sniper Elite game. In the same month the PS3 and 360 console versions were re-released as the "Game of the Year Edition" in Europe and the "Silver Star Edition" in North America that only include the downloadable content.

The game is AMD Eyefinity validated.

== Downloadable content ==
Originally bundled as a pre-order bonus download with the main game on its release, the first piece of downloadable content is a self-contained single player mission separate from the main campaign, titled "Assassinate the Führer". The mission involves an alternate historical scenario where Fairburne is sent to Salzburg to intercept a convoy in order to assassinate Adolf Hitler before he escapes the area via train. Following the game's release, the DLC was released to non-pre-order players across all platforms on 5 June 2012. The second DLC mission is "The Neudorf Outpost Pack" was released on 20 September 2012 for the PC and on 18 December 2012 for consoles. The mission concerns the demolition of a German-controlled fuel dump in the Harz Mountains and includes two new exclusive weapons. The third DLC mission is "The Landwehr Canal Pack" was released on 18 October 2012 and includes three new weapons. The mission required multiple German generals to be assassinated as they meet in night-time Berlin, thus being challenging and requiring planning. At the same time a new multiplayer mode was released for free through Steam called "Dog Tag Harvest Mode", where players collect points only after a fallen soldier's dog tag has been collected. The fourth DLC missions is "St. Pierre" was released on 6 February 2013 and also includes three new weapons. The missions involves the assassination of "General Rodebrecht", a rising star in the German army whose death could turn the tide of the war for the Allies.

On 7 November 2012, Rebellion released a "Multiplayer Expansion" for free on PC, PlayStation 3 and Xbox 360. The new online multiplayer modes support competitive play between players including traditional deathmatch and team deathmatch modes while introducing "distance king", both solo and team based where players' success is measured by the distance of shots. Another mode is "No Cross", a variant on the other modes where teams are separated to two sides of a map, requiring long range firefights only. In addition to the new game types, six new maps for use in multiplayer were also included. At the same time, a paid piece of DLC was also released involving a new selection of weapons.

== Spin-offs and re-releases ==
=== Sniper Elite: Nazi Zombie Army ===
A separate stand-alone title called Sniper Elite: Nazi Zombie Army was released following V2 on 28 February 2013 as a standalone expansion. It was initially available as a digital download through Steam; it was supposed to get a retail release but with no publisher for the title, and has not been released on consoles. The game is also developed by Rebellion and built from the same engine and template as V2, features the same mechanics and gameplay yet presents completely separate game modes (both single and multiplayer). The premise is that during the final days of World War II, with the German army close to defeat, Adolf Hitler deploys a last resort plan to raise the fallen as zombies through occult rituals and turn them against Allied forces, causing Germany to be overrun with the undead. The game features a series of campaign missions that can be played in single-player mode, or with up to four players in online co-op. The level structure has been compared to the Left 4 Dead series, involving missions with specific objectives requiring players to fight their way through levels containing various types of enemy zombie. Checkpoints break up each campaign with safe houses, allowing players to stock up on weapons and ammunition.

=== Sniper Elite: Nazi Zombie Army 2 ===
A sequel named Sniper Elite: Nazi Zombie Army 2 was released on 31 October 2013 where the player has to find the fragments of the Sagamartha Relic, the key to controlling the zombies while facing newer, deadlier enemies.

=== Zombie Army Trilogy ===
Another sequel was announced on 8 January 2015 and released 6 March 2015, alongside the remastered versions of Sniper Elite: Nazi Zombie Army and Sniper Elite: Nazi Zombie Army 2, under the package Zombie Army Trilogy for Microsoft Windows, PlayStation 4 and Xbox One. Due to German censorship of Nazi-related symbols, both games were released as just Zombie Army in Germany.

=== Sniper Elite V2 Remastered ===
Developer Rebellion Developments announced in March 2019 that an enhanced version of the game would launch that year for Microsoft Windows, Nintendo Switch, PlayStation 4 and Xbox One.

In April 2019, Rebellion Developments had confirmed that the remaster will release on 14 May 2019. The new version contains multiple playable characters (including those from Zombie Army Trilogy), updated graphics and a photo-mode for screenshots.

== Reception ==
Reception

Aggregate score
Aggregator	Score
Metacritic	(PC) 66/100 (PS3) 70/100 (WIIU) 58/100 (X360) 67/100

Review scores
Publication	Score
Destructoid	5.5/10
Edge	4/10
Eurogamer	6/10
Game Informer	8.25/10
GameRevolution	6/10
GameSpot	6/10
GameSpy	3/5
GamesRadar+	4/5
GamesTM	7/10
GameTrailers	6.3/10
IGN	8/10
Nintendo Life	5/10
Official Nintendo Magazine	50%
PlayStation Official Magazine – UK	7/10
Official Xbox Magazine (UK)	6/10
Official Xbox Magazine (US)	7.5/10
PC Gamer (US)	65/100
Push Square	6/10
The Guardian	3/5
VideoGamer.com	6/10

Sniper Elite V2 received "mixed or average" reviews, according to review aggregator website Metacritic.

In a review for GamesRadar, Matt Hughes favourably compared V2 against the original Sniper Elite in regards to the mission structure and variety, stating that "V2 keeps the objectives varied and avoids tedium by condensing and refining the physical scope of the game". Matt Hughes presented the scenery of ruined Berlin in the game and wrote that the player really feels to be one man against two armies. Similarly Nathan Meunier at IGN praised the single player, feeling that it "delivers a satisfying trek through a well-designed medley of war-torn cityscapes ripe with tactical opportunities for assassination and covert sneakery". While he noted the multiplayer, "Overwatch" was considered the stand out mode "where multiplayer really gets cool" as "these missions require careful collaborative teamwork, and they're a ton of fun." In a mixed response however, GameTrailers felt that the single player varied in quality, where "things take a turn for the worse when you're doing anything other than sniping", particularly in regards to close-quarter stealth segments in what the review considered to be "a real drag" causing "unbearable" trial-and-error. However, in the same review, it felt that the option to play the campaign cooperatively "remedies many of our complaints".

Phil Savage of PC Gamer enjoys the abundance of tricks you can play on the enemy soldiers. However he observes the easiest way to play is hiding behind cover and shooting approaching enemies, he still claims for effort put in more sophisticated play the game "rewards you with the feeling of carefully thought-out mischief falling into place". He complains about tighter levels, where the player is easily discovered and "In these moments the game devolves into a pop-up shooting gallery". Savage also praised the "tactical systems and satisfying ballistics" while being critical of "uncanny enemy vision".

GameSpy writes the AI has some moments of brilliance, mixed with complete stupidity, however he admits it allows killing enemies in exciting ways. He complains the enemies respawn until the player reaches certain checkpoints, which makes no sense in a game about a sniper.

GameRevolution praises details like that breathing while sniping is affected by how tired the character is, however they complain the enemies are predictable. They also complain it is easy to choose a wrong weapon accidentally.

GamesRadar reviewer praises tension and atmosphere of sneaking and making crucial shots. Game Informer reviewer, however, notes situations when a player's bullet is deflected by an invisible barrier, which is "a big deal" in a game where "every bullet matters" and complains the enemies seem to have binoculars glued to their faces.

A recurring feature noted in reviews was the "X-Ray Kill Cam". Official Xbox Magazine reviewer Chuck Osborne said that it "earns the game's Mature rating and our applause" while Tim Turi of Game Informer called it the game's "standout feature" that "never got old", however he admitted that it made his stomach "twitch a bit". GameSpot reviewer Chris Watters called the feature "brutal and gratuitous (perhaps too much so, for some)" yet still enjoyed it as a "delightfully gory" highlight. Marsh Davis of Eurogamer echoed this view by stating that "Its appeal is most definitely crass but, oddly, these animations also give each enemy's death a ghoulish significance."

The game has sold half a million copies on Steam as of July 2014.

== Prequel ==
A third entry in the Sniper Elite series was announced in March 2013. Sniper Elite III takes place in North Africa during World War II and has been described as "more of a sandbox game". Of the choice of gameplay, Kingsley stated that "We want you to feel you're dealing with scenarios that are believable and that you can genuinely make meaningful choices on how to tackle them."
