= Pax Dei (video game) =

Upcoming video game by Mainframe Industries

- Developer: Mainframe Industries
- Publishers: Mainframe Industries; New Tales
- Engine: Unreal Engine 5
- Platform: Windows
- Genres: Sandbox game, massively multiplayer online game
- Mode: Multiplayer

Pax Dei (/pæks deɪi/ (Note: The developers have mentioned that the pronunciation is Pax Day-ee.)) is a massively multiplayer online sandbox game developed by Mainframe Industries and co-published by Mainframe Industries and New Tales. The game was released in Steam Early Access on June 18, 2024, and launched officially on October 16, 2025.

== Gameplay ==
Pax Dei is a social sandbox and massively multiplayer online video game set in a fantasy medieval era. It will have a player driven economy where all items in the game world will be player crafted. Players will need to gather all the materials they need for crafting and will be able to craft weapons, armors and build their own homes.

Players play as a human and have to work alone or with other players to complete common goals. Pax Dei will not have non-player characters to provide quests, but the environment will contain lore and mysteries that players can solve.

Players are allowed to build overground on certain areas of the map called the Heartland valleys. Players are allocated an area of land called plot and this can be built over either individually or with other players.

== Development ==
The game's developer, Mainframe Industries, was founded in Helsinki, Finland, in 2019, and it has studios in Helsinki, Reykjavík (Iceland) and Paris (France). Pax Dei was announced in March 2023 with a closed playtest and the first closed alpha starting on November 14 and ending on November 26. The game was released in Steam Early Access on June 18, 2024 to mixed reviews. The game was released out of Steam Early Access on October 16, 2025 into 1.0.
