= Zombie Army Trilogy =

2015 video game

- Developer: Rebellion Developments
- Publishers: Rebellion Developments; Sold Out (retail)
- Series: Sniper Elite
- Platforms: PlayStation 4; Windows; Xbox One; Nintendo Switch
- Release: PlayStation 4, Windows, Xbox One; 6 March 2015; Nintendo Switch; 31 March 2020
- Genre: Third-person shooter
- Modes: Single-player, multiplayer

Zombie Army Trilogy is a third-person tactical shooter video game developed and published by Rebellion Developments. It is a spin-off to the Sniper Elite series and was released on 6 March 2015 for PlayStation 4, Windows, and Xbox One. A port for the Nintendo Switch was released on 31 March 2020 in North America and Europe, and in Japan on 28 May 2020. The game takes place in an alternative version of the final days of World War II, with the German army close to defeat. Adolf Hitler deploys a last resort plan to raise the fallen as zombies through occult rituals and turn them against Allied forces, thus causing Germany to become overrun with the undead.

The trilogy includes a remastered version of the original Sniper Elite: Nazi Zombie Army and its sequel, which were both released in 2013 as standalone downloadable content for Sniper Elite V2, and a previously unreleased third instalment in the series. The game, which can be played co-operatively or solo, features the single-player campaigns of the first two Nazi Zombie Army titles, alongside the new third chapter, combined into one Campaign mode, with a Horde mode similar to Killing Floor and the Left 4 Dead series also being available. The game's co-operative modes support eight playable characters, four of which are new female characters. In August 2015, the main characters of both games in the Left 4 Dead series were also added exclusively to the PC version's playable character roster.

A sequel, Zombie Army 4: Dead War, was released on 4 February 2020.

== Gameplay ==
Zombie Army Trilogy utilises similar mechanics to Sniper Elite V2 in that the player is encouraged to tackle enemies from afar with their sniper rifle as opposed to attacking them head-on, however this game adopts a more linear level design, with a reduced focus on stealth in favour of an action-oriented approach. The game is set in an alternate version of World War II, as such the player character utilises appropriate weapons for that era. Again like V2, the player can utilise various types of explosives, including standard grenades, tripwire mines and dynamite. Another mechanic returning from V2 is that, when using the sniper rifle, certain elements such as wind direction and strength and bullet drop can affect the path of the bullet when it is fired. Bullets can ricochet off surfaces or targets and strike others. The player can also hold their breath to steady their shot and more precisely determine the direction their bullet will travel in.

The "X-Ray Kill Cam" feature from V2 also makes a return, in which when a successful and skilled shot is made, the camera will track the bullet from the sniper rifle to the target in slow motion, and upon impact will show an anatomically correct x-ray style reveal of the body part being hit and the damage the bullet causes to the organs and bones. Some items can also trigger an explosion when shot, which can be used to the player's advantage against the hordes of zombies. The game will also measure notable shots by briefly displaying distance and other factors like whether it was a head shot or moving target.

== Plot ==
In April 1945, German dictator Adolf Hitler, who is hiding in the Führerbunker is informed by a Wehrmacht officer that the war is lost and Berlin will soon fall, leaving surrender as their only option. Enraged, Hitler executes the officer and declares that the Fatherland will not fall. He then orders the execution of "Plan Z"-the resurrection of all the Wehrmacht's fallen soldiers as zombies.

Once the zombies are released, OSS operative and sniper Karl Fairburne, veteran Red Army infantryman Boris Medvedev, Wehrmacht Captain Hermann Wolff, and German occultist Efram Schweiger are forced to team up in an abandoned village not far from Berlin. After clearing the village of zombies, the quartet commandeers a truck to take them to Berlin. Once there, they find the city in chaos; zombies roam the streets and alleyways. A radio transmission tells the quartet that the zombies are gathering in the nearby Memorial Cathedral, so the four go to investigate. At the cathedral, they find an SS occult general summoning zombies. In a fight with him and his minions, the survivors send the demonically-possessed officer back to Hell and discover a tunnel under the church's altar. The tunnel leads the group to an underground facility overrun with the undead. Inside, the four discover a reference to a Book of Souls, stored in the Berlin Central Library, which is a safeguard medieval occult text in case the zombies proved difficult to control. Hitler never retrieved it before unleashing the horde. Exiting the facility, the survivors fight their way to the library, where they obtain the book and unleash its power on the zombies, but find that its effects are negligible. The four then escape through the U-Bahn to a canal where they kill another SS occult general and escape via a British agent on a boat.

Meanwhile, in his underground bunker, Hitler and his last general (Hitler having killed the other two) discuss the Sagarmatha Relic, an artefact intended to protect Hitler from the undead soldiers. The general reveals that Hitler needed all three pieces in order for it to work, whereupon Hitler beats the officer to death with the Relic fragment. The zombies then storm the Führerbunker and kill Hitler. Fairburne and the survivors are led back to Berlin when Allied intelligence reports the Sagarmatha Relic and its purpose to them, so they arrive at the Brandenburg Gate to retrieve the first piece of the Relic from the Kaiser-Friederich-Museum, killing zombies along the way. Once retrieved, the four proceed to the Berlin Planetarium, where they discover a secret entrance to Hitler's bunker. After clearing the bunker, the four retrieve the second piece from Hitler's office. Schweiger directs them to a G-Tower outside Berlin. The four seize a train from a nearby railyard and make their way there. En route, they are informed by their British intelligence contact that the Allies have authorised Operation Red Harvest-a plan to carpet bomb Berlin and the surrounding area with atomic bombs to hopefully destroy the zombies. Racing against time, the four successfully penetrate the tower, defeat the occult general atop it, and retrieve the third piece of the Relic. The four are spirited away as the USAAF bombs the area.

Three months later, in August, Hitler has risen from the dead and joined the ranks of the undead as their leader. Still humanly sentient, Hitler has organised the zombies into a new army, using them to tighten his grip on Nazi Germany. Pockets of survivors have sprung up all over Germany, supported by Allied airdrops of supplies. Fairburne, Wolff, Medvedev, and Schweiger are tasked with retrieving war-winning intel from a British agent named MacNeil who they discover was killed by the zombies after being forced into St. Ulrich Hospital. When they do, they discover that Hitler has obtained the Book of Souls and is shipping his undead troops to an unknown location. The four hitch a ride on one of Hitler's supply trains and take it straight to a rally where Hitler is outlining his plans for the new Undead Reich. Fairburne attempts to assassinate Hitler, only for the bullet to stop right in front of Hitler's face. Only Schweiger's use of the Relic prevents the four from being swarmed by the zombies at the rally. The squad is then deployed to infiltrate the Folterschloss, Hitler's private mountain stronghold in a forest nearby. Making their way to the tram station that supports the castle, the four discover that Hitler is attempting to use humans to power a propaganda device in the castle. The four find the key that activates the full power of the Relic and escape as the man powering the device detonates the fortification. Hitler's headquarters is determined to be a large fortified facility inside the irradiated badlands outside Berlin, which the group infiltrates. They sabotage the industrial plant that the Führer is using to manufacture weapons, equipment, and food supplies for the zombie army and then face off with Hitler himself. After defeating an enormous zombie Hitler, Fairburne tosses the real Hitler down to Hell. Medvedev throws the relic, and Fairburne shoots it just before it enters the Hellmouth, releasing its holy energy. The quartet manage to escape as Hitler's headquarters is completely destroyed.

== Reception ==
Reception

Aggregate score
Aggregator	Score
Metacritic	(NS) 70/100 (PC) 72/100 (PS4) 62/100 (XONE) 62/100

Review scores
Publication	Score
Destructoid	6/10
GamesTM	6/10
Nintendo Life	7/10
Push Square	6/10

Zombie Army Trilogy received "mixed or average" reviews, according to review aggregator website Metacritic.
