= Zombie Army 4: Dead War =

2020 video game

- Developer: Rebellion Developments
- Publisher: Rebellion Developments
- Series: Sniper Elite
- Platforms: PlayStation 4; Windows; Xbox One; Stadia; Nintendo Switch
- Release: PlayStation 4, Windows, Xbox One; 4 February 2020; Google Stadia; 1 May 2020; Nintendo Switch; 26 April 2022
- Genres: Third-person shooter, survival horror
- Modes: Single-player, multiplayer

Zombie Army 4: Dead War is a third-person shooter video game developed and published by Rebellion Developments. It is a sequel to the 2015 compilation game Zombie Army Trilogy, and itself a spin-off to the Sniper Elite series. It was released on 4 February 2020 for PlayStation 4, Windows, and Xbox One, 1 May 2020 for Stadia, and 26 April 2022 for the Nintendo Switch.

== Gameplay and plot ==
Zombie Army 4: Dead War is a third-person shooter video game. The game is set in the year 1946, after the events of Zombie Army Trilogy, one year after Adolf Hitler was defeated by the Resistance and banished to hell. Even though the Hellmouth that Hitler opened was closed, the Zombie Menace continued, with innumerable number of the Nazi dead overwhelming and pushing the Allies out of Germany and back into territories such as France and Italy. Without a leader, most of the living dead are weak and can be easily destroyed as long as their numbers are low, but rumors spread about a cult ensuring that the horde has some cohesion/control. Most of the known world is now referring to the conflict against the Zombie menace as the "Dead War".

The story begins in Milan, where the players do battle against invading hordes of the dead attacking safe houses, only to learn that the dead are beginning to show some form of intelligence, enough to use weapons such as handguns and SMGs, but not as competent as living humans. Eventually, they are forced to retreat deeper into Italy as more dangerous versions of those the protagonists faced in the original game with new appearances and powers, and deadly new foes which appear as a mix of demonic mutants and vengeful spirits. They also begin to encounter hellish versions of destroyed German vehicles and armour, appearing as hell-powered abominations fuelled by flesh and magic. They travel to survivor brigade locations in Venice, Sardinia, Croatia, Naples and finally Rome.

The protagonists discover that Hitler was not killed after the final battle in Germany, only being banished to Hell rather than destroyed. Using his Death Cult, the maddened dictator began using Hell's own energy to build himself a new army, creating multiple weapons of mass devastation while also licking his wounds. To stop this threat, the survivors travel to Hell itself, sabotaging the dead's war factories and recovering the Sagarmartha Relic from the Trilogy to end the Furher once and for all. After Dr. Efram Schweiger returns the players back to the surface at the price of his own life, they then must do battle against Hitler one last time in Rome, where they destroy a massive Hell Machine, made by Hitler as his personal vehicle, then beating the Zombie Leader to an inch of his life before destroying him for good with the Relic.

Even with Hitler finally dead, the Survivor Brigade must chase after his cult and the remaining Zombies, knowing that with the Hellmouth closed and Hitler gone, the dead can no longer replenish their numbers, bringing the end to the Dead War ever closer.

== Reception ==
Reception

Aggregate scores
Aggregator	Score
Metacritic	(PC) 74/100 (PS4) 72/100 (XONE) 77/100 (NS) 80/100
OpenCritic	63% recommend

Review scores
Publication	Score
Easy Allies	7.5/10
Game Informer	7.5/10
GameRevolution	2.5/5
GamesRadar+	3.5/5
Hardcore Gamer	3.5/5
IGN	7/10
Nintendo Life	8/10
Nintendo World Report	9/10
PC Gamer (US)	70/100
Push Square	8/10
Shacknews	8/10
The Guardian	4/5
TouchArcade	4/5
VG247	3/5
VideoGamer.com	7/10

Zombie Army 4: Dead War received "mixed or average" reviews for PlayStation 4 and Windows according to review aggregator website Metacritic; the Nintendo Switch and Xbox One version received "generally favorable" reviews. Fellow review aggregator OpenCritic assessed that the game received strong approval, being recommended by 63% of critics.

Alex Spencer writing for PC Gamer said, "An excellently-crafted shooter, especially with friends. Just don't expect much in the way of brains". Mark Delaney of GamesRadar+ wrote, "It delivers a consistently fun and frenzied co-op shooter with plenty of ways to play and even more to keep you coming back".
