= SFX (magazine) =

Science fiction/fantasy magazine

- Cover of the December 2024 issue, featuring Wicked
- Editor: Darren Scott
- Former editors: Matt Bielby; Dave Golder; David Bradley; Richard Edwards
- Categories: Science fiction magazine
- Frequency: Every four weeks
- Circulation: 25,835 (January 2013 – January 2014, including digital)
- Founded: 1995
- Company: Future plc
- Country: United Kingdom
- Based in: Bath, Somerset
- Language: English
- Website: sfx.co.uk
- ISSN: 1749-6969
- OCLC: 813632043

SFX is a British magazine covering the topics of science fiction and fantasy. Its name is a reference to the abbreviated form of "special effects".

== Description ==
SFX magazine is published every four weeks by Future plc and was founded in 1995. The magazine covers topics in the genres of popular science fiction, fantasy, and horror, within the media of films, television, video games, comics, and literature. According to the magazine's website, the SF stands for "science fiction", but the X doesn't stand for anything in particular. Given the magazine's cinematic content, SFX may stand for 'Special Effects'.

Matt Bielby was the editor for the first 11 issues. He was followed by Dave Golder who left the magazine in 2005 but later returned as its online editor. Golder was replaced by David Bradley, who edited for over nine years before being promoted to Group Editor-in-Chief, handing over the issue editor role to Richard Edwards, who had been deputy editor. In 2019, Edwards left and was replaced by Darren Scott. Other members of staff include deputy editor Ian Berriman who ran the reviews section for many years, and, until January 2019, features editor Nick Setchfield.

The magazine featured a column written by David Langford from issue one to issue 274. Additional contributors have included Simon Pegg, Mark Millar, Paul Cornell, Jayne Nelson, and Bonnie Burton. SFX also publishes regular special editions.

In April 2013, the 35th European Science Fiction Convention in Kyiv named SFX Best Magazine in its Hall Of Fame award category.

The magazine's website sfx.co.uk used to feature news, reviews, competitions, reader blogs, and a reader forum. In November 2014, the website was closed and the URL redirected to the website Cinemablend which is now the online home of Future's sci-fi content, featuring TV and film features alongside videogames.

== SFX Awards ==
The SFX Awards celebrate the previous year's achievements in science fiction and are voted on by the readers of the SFX magazine. The first SFX Awards took place in 1997.

The winners were announced at the SFX Weekender (a sci-fi Festival in North Wales) and in the magazine. In 2013, the event continued under the name SciFi Weekender, without SFX's sponsorship.

== See also ==
- Starburst – British science fiction, fantasy, and horror entertainment magazine
- The Dark Side – British horror film magazine
