= Sniper Elite 5 =

2022 video game

- Developer: Rebellion Developments
- Publisher: Rebellion Developments
- Series: Sniper Elite
- Platforms: Microsoft Windows; PlayStation 4; PlayStation 5; Xbox One; Xbox Series X/S; iOS; iPadOS; macOS
- Release: PS4, PS5, Windows, Xbox One, Xbox Series X/S; 26 May 2022; iOS, iPadOS, macOS; 2026
- Genres: Tactical shooter, stealth
- Modes: Single-player, multiplayer

Sniper Elite 5 is a 2022 third-person tactical shooter stealth video game developed and published by Rebellion Developments. It is the sequel to Sniper Elite 4. It was released on 26 May 2022 for Microsoft Windows, PlayStation 4, PlayStation 5, Xbox One and Xbox Series X/S. It takes place in France during World War II. A sequel, Sniper Elite: Resistance was released on 30 January 2025.

== Gameplay ==
Similar to its predecessors, Sniper Elite 5 is a third-person shooter. Similar to Sniper Elite 4, the game features several large levels, which provide players with various opportunities to infiltrate and extract. When the player kills an enemy using a sniper rifle from a long distance, the X-Ray kill cam system will activate, in which the game's camera follows the bullet from the sniper rifle to the target, and shows body parts, bones or internal body organs being broken or ruptured by the bullet. Weapons in the game can be customised extensively. The single-player campaign can be played cooperatively with another player. The game introduces Invasion mode, which allows a third player to join a game session and play as an enemy sniper. A survival mode, which accommodates up to four players, is also featured.

== Plot ==
Sniper Elite 5 takes place following the events of Sniper Elite 4, in 1944, a year before Sniper Elite V2. SOE sniper Karl Fairburne is attached to an Army Ranger battalion in advance of Operation Overlord to assist with securing a beachhead and the village of Colline-Sur-Mer to help give the Americans a foothold and landing point in France. Upon arrival in the village and rendezvousing with resistance contact Charlie Barton, the Americans' submarine is destroyed and Charlie informs Karl that most of the group's contacts have been killed by units led by Obergruppenführer Abelard Möller after discovering information on his involvement in coordinating "Operation Kraken". Fellow contact Marie Chevalier informs the pair that Möller is occupying a nearby chateau and leaving to investigate. After breaking in and securing information on "Kraken" from the chateau and a high-ranking meeting taking place at the cathedral Beaumont-Saint-Denis, Möller becomes aware of Fairburne's involvement and his prior notoriety of disrupting high-profile Nazi projects.

In defiance of Ranger orders, Fairburne infiltrates a factory constructing war machinery and submarine stealth plating and destroys it to disrupt further production. Charlie smuggles him onto an island in the English Channel near Guernsey, where intel from the factory found a prototype U-boat constructed and prepared for testing using the stealth plating previously smuggled onto the island with coordination from the Japanese. Fairburne manages to destroy the submarine adding embarrassment to the Nazi high command, but results in Möller redoubling his efforts and proceeding with the project without the test data.

Following the Normandy beach landings, Fairburne regroups with the Rangers as part of an airborne landing into France but the unit's glider is shot down near the village of Desponts-Sur-Douve. Fairburne manages to drive out the occupying force allowing the Rangers to reclaim the village before leaving to investigate a facility in the Massif Central where additional weapons testing is being done with V-2 rockets. With this and discovering a map of targets that include several major cities in the United States, Fairburne quickly pieces together that "Kraken" is meant to use the U-boats to slip past the Allies deep into the Atlantic Ocean and use the V-2s on civilian targets to deter the United States' war efforts.

When Möller contacts the base and unintentionally speaks directly to Fairburne, he panics knowing Fairburne is fully aware of the project and needs to launch immediately before the Allies can react. Fairburne deploys to the town of Saint Nazaire where the U-boat pen is kept under tightened Kriegsmarine security, where he quickly destroys the "Kraken" fleet, including its flagship stealth-plated I-400s. With "Kraken" destroyed and fearing for his life, Möller retreats to his chateau to cover up his involvement in the project before going into hiding, but is assassinated by Fairburne before he can escape. As Charlie and Marie celebrate the mission's success, Fairburne ponders his next deployment.

== Development ==
In March 2019, series developer Rebellion Developments confirmed that they had started the development of Sniper Elite 5. The game was officially announced during The Game Awards 2021. According to Rebellion, the team used photogrammetry when they were creating the game's levels. Some locations in the game were inspired by Guernsey. The game was released for Microsoft Windows, PlayStation 4, PlayStation 5, Xbox One and Xbox Series X/S on 26 May 2022. Players who pre-ordered the game gained access to an extra mission named "Target Fuhrer: Wolf Mountain" in which the player must infiltrate Hitler's private retreat in the Alps to eliminate him and his guards.

It was developed using Rebellion's in-house game engine Asura.

== Reception ==
Reception

Aggregate score
Aggregator	Score
Metacritic	(PC) 79/100 (PS5) 77/100 (XSXS) 77/100

Review scores
Publication	Score
Destructoid	6.5/10
Electronic Gaming Monthly	4/5
Eurogamer	Essential
GameSpot	8/10
GamesRadar+	4.5/5
Hardcore Gamer	4/5
IGN	7/10
Jeuxvideo.com	15/20
PC Gamer (US)	71/100
Push Square	8/10
Shacknews	9/10
VentureBeat	4.5/5

Sniper Elite 5 received "generally favorable" reviews, according to review aggregator website Metacritic.

EGM called Sniper Elite 5 "the best game in the series so far", citing its intricate level design, deep weapon customisation system, and satisfying gameplay as its strengths, while taking issue with its underdeveloped characters and story. Eurogamer felt that the title was "a true great of the genre" and "one of the most entertaining games of the year" due to its flexible sandboxes and imaginative interactive representation of World War II. GameSpot claimed that the game's strengths rested in the core sniping experience, encouragement of player agency, tense multiplayer invasions, and the robust weapon customisation model. GamesRadar+ stated that the game was "the most well-rounded Sniper Elite game" and noted that while the series' core strengths and weaknesses remained present, the Axis Invasion mode elevated it above prior entries in the franchise. Hardcore Gamer wrote that the game's variety, between its variance in visual design, "some of the series' best" level design, and Axis Invasion mode, which was lauded as "the best thing about [Sniper Elite 5]" were what made it better than its predecessors. Shacknews similarly lauded the title, awarding it a 9 out of 10 while praising how the guns "feel responsive" and also praising the detail of the X-ray kills, but criticised the performance on PC and dated facial animations. IGN, by contrast, criticised story and enemy AI and felt that the title felt like "more of an incremental upgrade rather than a major revolution", and voiced disappointment in the recycling of objectives which caused the game's campaign to feel repetitive as a result. The mission "Spy Academy" was often singled out as one of the best missions in the game.
