= Rebellion Developments =

British video game company

Rebellion Developments Limited
- Type: Private
- Industry: Video games Comic books (from 2000); Feature films (from 2017)
- Founded: 4 December 1992; 33 years ago
- Founder: Jason Kingsley; Chris Kingsley
- Headquarters: Oxford, England
- Area served: Worldwide
- Key people: Jason Kingsley (CEO); Chris Kingsley (CTO)
- Products: Alien vs. Predator series; Sniper Elite series
- Number of employees: 475 (2022)
- Subsidiaries: Rebellion Liverpool; Rebellion North; Rebellion Film Studios; Rebellion Publishing; Rebellion Warwick
- Website: rebellion.com

Rebellion Developments Limited is a British video game developer based in Oxford. Founded by Jason and Chris Kingsley in December 1992, the company is best known for Sniper Elite and multiple games in the Alien vs. Predator series. Sister company Rebellion Publishing has published comic books since 2000, when it purchased 2000 AD, the publisher of characters such as Judge Dredd and Rogue Trooper. In the 2010s the studio saw growth and success with its Sniper Elite series of games. The series has spanned 5 mainline installments and multiple spin-offs, including the Sniper Elite: Nazi Zombie Army entries. Their latest title, Atomfall, was released on 27 March 2025.

== History ==
=== Origins (1992–1999) ===
Rebellion was founded on 4 December 1992 by brothers Jason and Chris Kingsley in Oxford, England. The pair had just finished academic degrees at the University of Oxford, and had ambitions of starting doctorates. In their spare time, they did freelance work in the games industry. When their freelance roles began to expand and they were taking on more management responsibilities, they decided to establish Rebellion in Oxford. The foundation of the studio was laid when the brothers secured a deal with video game publisher Atari UK. They presented a 3D dragon flight game demo to directors at the publisher, who were seeking games for the upcoming Atari Jaguar system. They were commissioned by Atari to work on two titles for the Jaguar, Checkered Flag and Alien vs Predator, which both released in 1994. The development team was expanded to assist with work on these games. It included artists Stuart Wilson, Toby Banfield, and Justin Rae, along with programmers Mike Beaton, Rob Dibley, and Andrew Whittaker. Following Alien vs Predator, Rebellion saw no releases for some years, with its next project, the intentionally light-hearted PC game Mr. Tank, going unpublished.

=== Expansion and comics (2000–2009) ===
Over the course of the decade, Rebellion underwent rapid expansion with numerous acquisitions of other studios and properties. This wave of expansions included the purchase of 2000 AD from Fleetway Publications, which began Rebellion's first foray into comic books. In addition to further publications under the label, Rebellion began to develop associated characters for the games market. In 2003 Rebellion released the game Judge Dredd: Dredd vs. Death.

In 2004, Rebellion entered a deal with DC Comics to reprint several 2000 AD stories in trade paperback form, including Judge Dredd, Strontium Dog, Nikolai Dante, and Sinister Dexter. When DC left the venture, citing poor sales, Rebellion created its own line of American graphic novels that were distributed through Simon & Schuster. In 2005 Rebellion also created the series Judge Dredd: The Complete Case Files, which has begun reprinting almost every appearance of Judge Dredd in chronological order.

Rebellion's 2005 game Sniper Elite was awarded "Best PC/Console Game" in the TIGA Awards of 2005. Following the release, Rebellion acquired numerous games studios and properties. This began in 2006 with the purchase of Tomb Raider developers Core Design from Eidos Interactive, as well as Strangelite from Empire Interactive, and Elixir Studios' former IPs including Evil Genius and Republic: The Revolution. The acquisitions made Rebellion the largest independent game developer in Europe.

Acquisitions later in the decade were predominantly associated with the growing publishing wing of the company, including Blackfish Publishing and Mongoose Publishing in 2008, followed by Cubicle 7 and Solaris Books in 2009. On 14 July 2009, the company purchased the Ground Control, Empire Earth, Lords of Magic and Lords of the Realm franchises from Activision. These were ex-Sierra Entertainment properties that the company offloaded due to its new long-term strategy following the Vivendi Games merger.

=== Closure of Derby studio (2009–2010) ===
In 2009, Rebellion's Rogue Warrior game received poor reviews. This was followed by Aliens vs. Predator in 2010, published by Sega, which received a mixed critical reception, but debuted at number one on the UK all formats chart. Significant changes were made in 2010, including staff cuts at its main studio in Oxford as well as the closure of Rebellion Derby – the former Core Design studio which had only been purchased four years previously. Studio CEO Jason Kingsley discussed pivoting its focus to smaller titles in the wake of the changes. The move coincided with the end of a property lease. Kingsley commented that "growth is sometimes painful, never more so than in the current climate and we have had to take a long hard look at how we operate our studio network. Strategically we have decided to review the need for the Derby facilities."

==== Controversy ====
Following the closure of the Derby studio, the company was accused by laid off employees and their spouses of withholding wages and severance pay. The studio was further accused of not paying legal fees for staff members who sought "legal help during the redundancy consultation period".

=== Return to growth (2011–present) ===
The mid-2010s saw major successes with the Sniper Elite franchise. The company returned to expansion through the purchase of additional studios and properties, expanding both its computer game and publishing sectors, and further diversified into live action film late in the decade. Kingsley was awarded an OBE in 2012 for his work supporting the sector.

In July 2013, Rebellion bought the Battlezone and the Moonbase Commander franchises during the Atari bankruptcy proceedings. Cubicle 7 left Rebellion in December 2014 via management buyout. Sniper Elite III was released that year, and by September 2015 the series had passed 10 million copies sold worldwide.

In August 2016, Rebellion acquired the post-1970 IPC Youth and Fleetway comics libraries from Egmont. It reprinted these under its Treasury of British Comics imprint, including Roy of the Rovers, Wildcat and One-Eyed Jack. This would be followed by an acquisition of the pre-1970 titles from the group in 2018.

In November 2018, Rebellion set up a studio for a film and TV series based on 2000 AD characters, the first projects being Judge Dredd: Mega-City One and Rogue Trooper, both directed by Duncan Jones. Rebellion Productions, the film production arm founded in 2017, would occupy a disused newspaper factory in Didcot, England. The studio would launch its first feature film in 2021.

Several games related acquisitions would be made through 2018 and 2019, including the Radiant Worlds, rebranded "Rebellion Warwick" and TickTock games, rebranded "Rebellion North". Rebellion acquired The Bitmap Brothers' library of classic games in 2019.

In 2021 Rebellion announced a new bi-monthly humour comic, Monster Fun, would begin in 2022.

== Subsidiaries ==
=== Active ===
- Audiomotion Studios (acquired in 2003)
- Rebellion Film Studios
- Rebellion Liverpool (acquired in 2006)
- Rebellion North (acquired in 2019)
- Rebellion Publishing
  - 2000 AD
  - Abaddon Books
  - Ravenstone Press
  - Solaris Books
- Rebellion Unplugged
- Rebellion Warwick (acquired in 2018)

=== Defunct ===
- Razorworks (acquired in 2008)
- Rebellion Banbury (acquired in 2007)
- Rebellion Derby (acquired in 2006)

== Games ==
=== Games developed ===
| Year | Title | Platform(s) |
|---|---|---|
| 1991 | Jet Pak Jak (cancelled) | Game Boy |
| 1993 | Eye of the Storm | Amiga, MS-DOS |
| 1994 | Alien vs Predator | Atari Jaguar |
| 1994 | Checkered Flag | Atari Jaguar |
| 1995 | Legions of the Undead (cancelled) | Atari Jaguar |
| 1999 | Klustar | Game Boy Color |
| 1999 | Aliens Versus Predator | Windows, Classic Mac OS |
| 1999 | Mission: Impossible | Game Boy Color |
| 1999 | Tom Clancy's Rainbow Six | PlayStation |
| 2000 | The Mummy | Windows, PlayStation |
| 2000 | Asterix: Search for Dogmatix | Game Boy Color |
| 2000 | Gunlok | Windows |
| 2000 | Skyhammer | Atari Jaguar |
| 2001 | Snood | Game Boy Advance |
| 2001 | Midnight Club: Street Racing | Game Boy Advance |
| 2001 | Gunfighter: The Legend of Jesse James | PlayStation |
| 2002 | Tom Clancy's Rainbow Six: Lone Wolf | PlayStation |
| 2002 | Delta Force: Urban Warfare | PlayStation |
| 2002 | Largo Winch.//Commando Sar | PlayStation |
| 2002 | Medal of Honor: Underground | Game Boy Advance |
| 2002 | Tiger Woods PGA Tour Golf | Game Boy Advance |
| 2003 | Judge Dredd: Dredd vs. Death | GameCube, PlayStation 2, Windows, Xbox |
| 2003 | Gunfighter II: Revenge of Jesse James | PlayStation 2 |
| 2004 | World War Zero: Iron Storm | Windows, PlayStation 2 |
| 2005 | Sniper Elite | PlayStation 2, Wii, Windows, Xbox |
| 2005 | Delta Force: Black Hawk Down | Windows, PlayStation 2 |
| 2006 | 007: From Russia with Love | PlayStation Portable |
| 2006 | Dead to Rights: Reckoning | PlayStation Portable |
| 2006 | Gun: Showdown | PlayStation Portable |
| 2006 | Rogue Trooper | Windows, PlayStation 2, Wii, Xbox |
| 2006 | Miami Vice: The Game | PlayStation Portable |
| 2006 | Delta Force: Black Hawk Down – Team Sabre | Windows, PlayStation 2 |
| 2006 | Prism: Guard Shield | Windows |
| 2007 | Star Wars Battlefront: Renegade Squadron | PlayStation Portable |
| 2007 | Free Running | Windows, PlayStation 2, Wii |
| 2007 | Harry Potter and the Order of the Phoenix | PlayStation Portable |
| 2007 | Aliens vs. Predator: Requiem | PlayStation Portable |
| 2007 | The Simpsons Game | PlayStation 2, PlayStation Portable, Wii |
| 2008 | Call of Duty: World at War – Final Fronts | PlayStation 2 |
| 2009 | Shellshock 2: Blood Trails | Windows, PlayStation 3, Xbox 360 |
| 2009 | PDC World Championship Darts 2009 | Wii |
| 2009 | Rogue Warrior | Windows, PlayStation 3, Xbox 360 |
| 2009 | Star Wars Battlefront: Elite Squadron | PlayStation Portable |
| 2010 | Aliens vs Predator | Windows, PlayStation 3, Xbox 360 |
| 2010 | PDC World Championship Darts: ProTour | PlayStation 3, Wii, Xbox 360 |
| 2010 | Evil Genius: WMD | Facebook Platform |
| 2011 | Judge Dredd vs. Zombies | Android, iOS, Windows Phone |
| 2012 | NeverDead | PlayStation 3, Xbox 360 |
| 2012 | Sniper Elite V2 | Windows, PlayStation 3, Xbox 360, Wii U, Xbox One, PlayStation 4, Switch |
| 2012 | Zombie HQ | Android, iOS, Windows |
| 2012 | Sinbad | iOS |
| 2012 | Guns 4 Hire | Android, iOS, Windows Phone |
| 2013 | Sniper Elite: Nazi Zombie Army | Windows |
| 2013 | Sniper Elite: Nazi Zombie Army 2 | Windows |
| 2014 | Sniper Elite III | Windows, Switch, PlayStation 3, PlayStation 4, Xbox 360, Xbox One |
| 2015 | Zombie Army Trilogy | Windows, PlayStation 4, Xbox One, Switch |
| 2015 | Evil Genius Online | Android, Facebook Platform, iOS |
| 2016 | Battlezone | PlayStation 4, Windows, Xbox One, Switch |
| 2017 | Sniper Elite 4 | Windows, PlayStation 4, Xbox One, Switch, Stadia, iOS, ipadOS, macOS |
| 2018 | Strange Brigade | Windows, PlayStation 4, Xbox One, Switch, Stadia |
| 2018 | Arca's Path VR | Windows, PlayStation 4 |
| 2020 | Zombie Army 4: Dead War | Windows, PlayStation 4, Xbox One, Stadia, Switch |
| 2021 | Evil Genius 2: World Domination | Windows, PlayStation 4, PlayStation 5, Xbox One, Xbox Series X/S |
| 2021 | Sniper Elite VR | Windows, PlayStation 4, Meta Quest |
| 2022 | Sniper Elite 5 | Windows, PlayStation 4, PlayStation 5, Xbox One, Xbox Series X/S |
| 2023 | Sniper Elite VR: Winter Warrior | Meta Quest |
| 2025 | Sniper Elite: Resistance | Windows, PlayStation 4, PlayStation 5, Xbox One, Xbox Series X/S |
| 2025 | Atomfall | Windows, PlayStation 4, PlayStation 5, Xbox One, Xbox Series X/S |
| 2025 | Zombie Army VR | Windows, PlayStation 5, Meta Quest |
| 2026 | Speedball | Windows, PlayStation 5, Xbox Series X/S |
| 2027 | Alien Deathstorm | Windows, PlayStation 5, Xbox Series X/S |

=== Games published ===
- Evil Genius (2009, PC). Originally developed by Elixir Studios and published in 2004.
- Republic: The Revolution (2009, PC). Originally developed by Elixir Studios and published in 2003.
- Empire Earth (2009, PC). Originally developed by Stainless Steel Studios and published in 2001. The expansion pack was released in 2002.
- Ground Control (2009, PC). Originally developed by Massive Entertainment and published in 2000.
- Ground Control II: Operation Exodus (2009, PC). Originally developed by Massive Entertainment and published in 2004.
- Lords of the Realm (2009, PC). Originally developed by Impressions Games and published in 1994. This includes Lords of the Realm II published in 1996.
- Lords of the Realm III (2009, PC). Originally developed by Impressions Games and published in 2004.
- Lords of Magic (2009, PC). Originally developed by Impressions Games and published in 1998.
- Woolfe: The Red Hood Diaries (2015, PC). Originally developed by GriN Gamestudio and published in 2015.
- Battlezone 98 Redux (2016, PC). Developed by Big Boat Interactive.
- Battlezone: Combat Commander (2018, PC). Developed by Big Boat Interactive.

== Films ==
| Release date | Title | Director(s) |
|---|---|---|
| September 5, 2020 | From Bedrooms to Billions: The Playstation Revolution | Anthony Caulfield and Nicola Caulfield |
| February 15, 2021 | School’s Out Forever | Oliver Milburn |
| TBA | Rogue Trooper | Duncan Jones |
| TBA | Judge Dredd: Mega City One | TBA |
