= Sniper Elite =

Video game series

- Genres: Tactical shooter, stealth
- Developer: Rebellion Developments
- Publishers: MC2 France; Namco Hometek; Reef Entertainment; MC2-Microïds; 505 Games; Rebellion Developments
- Platforms: Google Stadia; iOS; iPadOS; macOS; Meta Quest 2; Meta Quest 3; Meta Quest Pro; Microsoft Windows; Nintendo Switch; Oculus Quest; PlayStation 2; PlayStation 3; PlayStation 4; PlayStation 5; Wii; Wii U; Xbox; Xbox 360; Xbox One; Xbox Series X and Series S
- First release: Sniper Elite; 18 October 2005
- Latest release: Zombie Army VR; 22 May 2025

Sniper Elite is a tactical shooter video game series developed by Rebellion Developments. It is a third-person shooter that emphasises a less direct approach to combat, encouraging the player as a sniper to use stealth and keep distance from enemy soldiers.

The mainline games follow Karl Fairburne, a German-American Special Operations Executive and Office of Strategic Services operative battling Axis forces during World War II. The series has received generally positive reviews from critics and sold over 30 million units.

== Gameplay ==
Sniper Elite is a third-person shooter that involves stealth and first-person shooter game elements. Many of the single player levels allow multiple routes for the players to take in order to avoid direct firefights.

Set in World War II, the player character, a German-American OSS operative named Karl Fairburne, utilises appropriate weapons for the era. The sniper rifle is the primary weapon throughout the game, though additional side arms (submachine guns and pistols) can be used depending on the situation. In addition to hand grenades, the player can also deploy tripwire booby traps, land mines and dynamite. The player can also shoot the enemies' own grenades to trigger an explosion. Binoculars are used to tag enemies in view, displaying their position and movements to the player. Different postures such as crouching or lying prone can steady a shot, and the player can take a deep breath to "focus" for increased accuracy. Realistic ballistics are optional, taking into consideration factors such as wind direction and strength and bullet drop, potentially altering the outcome of a shot even with the use of the scope.

Introduced in Sniper Elite V2 is the "X-Ray Kill Cam", a feature whereupon a successful and skilled shot will, in slow motion, follow the bullet from the rifle to the target's point of impact, showing an anatomically correct x-ray of the body part being hit and the damage the bullet causes to the organs and/or bones. In Sniper Elite III, stealth mechanics were reworked. An eye icon squints or opens to denote the player's level of detection by the enemy. Enemy soldiers will also have a circle meter over their heads to indicate alert status. Players are then forced to relocate periodically to prevent detection with a white ghost image to mark their last known position and the enemy will search a wider area.

== Games ==
Aggregate review scores
Game	Metacritic
Sniper Elite	(PC) 76/100 (PS2) 76/100 (Wii) 71/100 (Xbox) 77/100
Sniper Elite V2	(PC) 66/100 (PS3) 70/100 (WIIU) 58/100 (X360) 67/100
Sniper Elite: Nazi Zombie Army	(PC) 62/100
Sniper Elite: Nazi Zombie Army 2	(PC) 53/100
Sniper Elite III	(PC) 71/100 (PS4) 67/100 (XONE) 63/100
Zombie Army Trilogy	(NS) 70/100 (PC) 72/100 (PS4) 62/100 (XONE) 62/100
Sniper Elite 4	(NS) 79/100 (PC) 78/100 (PS4) 77/100 (XONE) 81/100
Zombie Army 4: Dead War	(NS) 80/100 (PC) 74/100 (PS4) 72/100 (XONE) 77/100
Sniper Elite VR	(PC) 68/100 (PS4) 76/100
Sniper Elite 5	(PC) 79/100 (PS5) 77/100 (XSXS) 77/100
Sniper Elite: Resistance	(PC) 70/100 (PS5) 75/100 (XSXS) 73/100

Year	Title	Platform(s)
2005	Sniper Elite	macOS, Microsoft Windows, PlayStation 2, Wii, Xbox
2012	Sniper Elite V2	Microsoft Windows, Nintendo Switch, PlayStation 3, PlayStation 4, Wii U, Xbox 360, Xbox One
2013	Sniper Elite: Nazi Zombie Army	Microsoft Windows
2013	Sniper Elite: Nazi Zombie Army 2	Microsoft Windows
2014	Sniper Elite III	Microsoft Windows, Nintendo Switch, PlayStation 3, PlayStation 4, Xbox 360, Xbox One
2015	Zombie Army Trilogy	Microsoft Windows, Nintendo Switch, PlayStation 4, Xbox One
2017	Sniper Elite 4	Google Stadia, iOS, iPadOS, macOS, Microsoft Windows, Nintendo Switch, PlayStation 4, Xbox One
2020	Zombie Army 4: Dead War	Google Stadia, Microsoft Windows, PlayStation 4, Xbox One
2021	Sniper Elite VR	Microsoft Windows, Oculus Quest, PlayStation 4
2022	Sniper Elite 5	iOS, iPadOS, macOS, Microsoft Windows, PlayStation 4, PlayStation 5, Xbox One, Xbox Series X and Series S
2023	Sniper Elite VR: Winter Warrior	Meta Quest 2, Meta Quest 3, Meta Quest Pro
2025	Sniper Elite: Resistance	Microsoft Windows, PlayStation 4, PlayStation 5, Xbox One, Xbox Series X and Series S
2025	Zombie Army VR	Meta Quest, Microsoft Windows, PlayStation 5

== Novels ==
Rebellion Developments' book imprint Abaddon Books released a novel inspired by the game, Sniper Elite: The Spear of Destiny written by Jasper Bark. In this book, Karl Fairburne's mission is to stop Nazi SS general Helmstadt from selling a working atomic bomb to the Soviets.

A short story written by Scott K. Andrews titled Sniper Elite V2 - Target Hitler was released as an E-Book.

In 2022, Sniper Elite: Origins was released, featuring three short stories about Fairburne's early adventures.

The Nazi Zombie Army series has also seen multiple E-books and novels, including E-book prequel Nazi Zombie Army: Götterdämmerung in 2014, and novel Zombie Army: Fortress of the Dead and comic mini-series Zombie Army 4: Last Rites in 2020.

== Film ==
On 29 March 2021, Variety reported that a film adaptation of Sniper Elite is in development with Marla Studios' Jean-Julien Baronnet producing along with the game's producer and CEO of Rebellion Jason Kingsley, Gary Graham writing and Brad Peyton directing with the film follows Karl Fairburne engage in a cat-and-mouse chase through the streets of London at the height of the Blitz during World War II, as he tries to save British Prime Minister Winston Churchill from a Nazi assassin.
