= List of World War I video games =

This is a list of video games that are set in World War I.

== Adventure games ==
- Castlevania: Bloodlines (1994)
- The Last Express (1997)
- Valiant Hearts: The Great War (2014)
- 11-11: Memories Retold (2018)
- Valiant Hearts: Coming Home (2023)
- The Caribou Trail (2026)

== Action games ==
- The Young Indiana Jones Chronicles (video game) (1992)
- Instruments of Chaos starring Young Indiana Jones (1994)
- The Snowfield (2011)

== Horror games ==
- Eternal Darkness: Sanity's Requiem (2002)
- NecroVision (2009)
- NecrovisioN: Lost Company (2010)
- 1916 - Der unbekannte Krieg (2011)
- Ad Infinitum (2023)
- Amnesia: The Bunker (2023)
- CONSCRIPT (2024)
- Trench Tales (2025)
- Trench Face (2025)

== Cancelled titles ==
- Sadness

== First-person shooters ==
- Codename Eagle (1999)
- Iron Storm (2002)
- Darkest of Days (2009)
- Battlefield 1 (2016)
- Beach Invasion 1915 Gallipoli (2025)

== Tactical shooters ==
- Verdun (2015)
- Tannenberg (2019)
- Beyond the Wire (2020)
- Holdfast: Frontlines WW1 (2022)
- Isonzo (2022)
- Gallipoli (2026)
- Over The Top: WWI (2026)

== Third-person shooters ==
- Sky Kid (1985)

== Combat flight simulators ==
- Red Baron (1980)
- Sopwith (1984)
- Red Baron (1990)
- Wings (1990)
- Blue Max: Aces of the Great War (1990)
- Chocks Away (1990)
- Knights of the Sky (1990)
- Warbirds (video game) (1991)
- Wings 2: Aces High (1992)
- Dogfight: 80 Years of Aerial Warfare (1993)
- Aces of the Deep (1994)
- Wings of Glory (1994)
- Dawn Patrol (1994)
- Flying Corps (1996)
- Red Baron II (1997)
- Master of the Skies: The Red Ace (2000)
- Red Ace Squadron (2001)
- Wings of War (2004)
- Snoopy vs. the Red Baron (2006)
- First Eagles: The Great War 1918 (2006)
- Time Ace (2007)
- Rise of Flight: The First Great Air War (2009)
- Air Conflicts: Secret Wars (2011)
- Snoopy Flying Ace (2010)
- Wings over Flanders Fields (2013)
- IL-2 Sturmovik: Flying Circus (2019)

== Naval simulators ==
- Dreadnoughts (1992)
- Jutland (2006)
- 1914 Shells of Fury (2007)

== Real-time strategy ==
- Powermonger Expansion Disk (1991)
- The Ancient Art of War in the Skies (1992)
- Empire Earth (video game) (2001)
- The Entente: Battlefields WW1 (2003)
- Empires: Dawn of the Modern world (2003)
- Empire Earth II (2005)
- Aggression – Reign over Europe (2008)
- Warfare 1917 (2008)
- World War One (2008)
- Toy Soldiers (2010)
- Call of Cthulhu: The Wasted Land (2012)
- The Great War: Western Front (2023)

== Turn-based strategy ==
- History Line: 1914-1918 (1992)
- Imperialism (1997)
- The Operational Art of War series (1998-2017)

== Turn-based tactics ==
- Hogs of War (2000)

== Grand strategy wargames ==
- Victoria: An Empire Under the Sun (2003)
  - Victoria: Revolutions (2006)
- Victoria 2 (2010)
- Darkest Hour: A Hearts of Iron Game (2011)
- Strategic Command series
- Making History: The Great War (2015)
- Supreme Ruler The Great War (2017)

== City-building game ==
- Kaiserpunk (2025)

== See also ==
- List of World War I films
- List of World War II video games
- List of World War II films
