= Hot Wheels: Velocity X =

2002 vehicular combat video game

- PAL region GameCube cover art featuring MS-T Suzuka and HW Prototype 12
- Developer: Beyond Games (Note: Game Boy Advance version developed by Saffire)
- Publisher: THQ
- Director: Christopher Salmon
- Producers: Mark Morris; Brian Ulinger
- Designers: Jeff Peters; Neil Melville
- Programmers: Daryl Tung; Bruce Johnson (PC); Kennett Galbraith (PS2); Ryan McBride (GCN)
- Artist: Neil Melville
- Writer: David Wohl
- Composer: Rick Jackson
- Series: Hot Wheels
- Engine: Brainstorm
- Platforms: Windows; Game Boy Advance; PlayStation 2 GameCube
- Release: Windows: NA: October 18, 2002; EU: November 29, 2002; Game Boy Advance: NA: November 5, 2002; PAL: December 6, 2002; GameCube: NA: November 6, 2002; EU: November 29, 2002; PlayStation 2: NA: November 12, 2002; EU: November 29, 2002
- Genres: Vehicular combat, racing
- Modes: Single-player, multiplayer

Hot Wheels: Velocity X (released as Hot Wheels: Velocity X – Maximum Justice for the PlayStation 2) is a 2002 vehicular combat racing game developed by Beyond Games and published by THQ based on Mattel's Hot Wheels line of scale model cars. The story follows Maxwell "Max" Justice, a teenage street racer, and his efforts to thwart the Monument City Underworld crime ring intent on stealing the Velocity X formula. Players assume the role of Max, competing in street races and demolition derbies across five locations in the greater metropolitan area.

Velocity X was released in North America and PAL regions for Windows, PlayStation 2, and GameCube. It is the sixteenth video game based on the Hot Wheels intellectual property, and the third home console Hot Wheels video game release. A Game Boy Advance version of the game developed by Saffire was released in conjunction with the GameCube version, and was one of the first titles to use the GameCube's Game Link cable to unlock bonus content.

Velocity X received mixed reviews across all platforms upon release, with praise for its variety of Hot Wheels cars and game modes, and criticism for its mission structure, vehicle controls, stunt mechanics, and graphical fidelity. Velocity X would become the final title developed under the Beyond Games name, as the studio would undergo restructuring after The 3DO Company filed for Chapter 11 bankruptcy in 2003.

== Gameplay ==
Velocity X is a vehicular combat game in which the player competes in races and demolition derbies across five modes. In the main Adventure mode, the player has to beat all 14 missions, while completing tasks in each one. These tasks vary from destroying a few vehicles, collecting items, racing/battling a boss, and more. The game's missions take place across 5 different locations, with three missions in each world, except for the final world, which only has 2 missions.

In the GBA version, the story mode is simply races mixed with tasks given by the Professor such as destroying other vehicles and collecting items. At the end of each, a boss is raced.

In the Challenge mode, the player has to complete all 18 challenges. Each challenge comes with various tasks, such as achieving "x" Stunt points, collecting "x" gears, or reaching the finish before the clock hits 00:00. Along the way, new vehicles, as well as new race/battle maps and weapons, are unlocked. In the GBA version the Challenges are Battle, where the player destroys opponents; and Tag, where the player rams opponents.

The game also has a Drag Race mode, a Battle mode, and a Joyride mode. The Drag Race and Battle modes are both single-player and multiplayer (except in the PC version of the game). The Joyride, in essence, is free roam. The player can also unlock cars in Joyride by collecting all ten gears or finding the hidden key in each map. These modes are absent in the GBA version.

The player begins with six vehicles, and three in the GBA version. The game has 27 additional vehicles that can be unlocked by successfully completing various challenges and missions. Each car is rated on its speed, grip, stunt, and armor.

== Plot ==
Maxwell "Max" Justice (David Kaufman) a 17 year old racing prodigy for Team Hot Wheels is street racing when he gets a distress signal from his home in Monument City, and returns to find the building ransacked. Shortly afterward, an alarm at the Hot Wheels Engineering Plant is sounded. Gearhead (Wally Wingert)—a robotic assistant designed by Max's father, Dr. Peter Justice (Neil Ross)—advises Max not to investigate, but eventually gives in. Max heads for the Engineering Plant, but a timed explosive device destroys the building before he arrives. Not long after, another explosive device is planted at the Hot Wheels Tire Factory. Max is able to retrieve the bomb before it detonates, and drops it off at an abandoned building, that was scheduled for demolition.

Max learns that the gang responsible for the Engineering Plant and Tire Factory explosions used the commotion as a diversion to steal Dr. Justice's experimental HW Prototype 12 vehicle and a series of disks containing research on a "Velocity X" project. One gang member, Conrad "Nitro" Byrne (Kaufman), claims to have the disks and challenges Max to a race. After the race Nitro reveals that he never had the disks, and that he was told to deliver them to someone in Turbine Sands. Dr. Justice tells Max that the Velocity X disks contain a formula for a fuel allowing Hot Wheels cars to travel twice their normal speed, and that his stolen HW Prototype 12 runs on uranium and can turn invisible for short periods of time.

After intercepting the gang's uranium shipment and stopping a hijacked train in Turbine Sands, Max encounters "Backroads" Belcher (Joe Alaskey). Belcher wagers the uranium in exchange for a face-off with Max. Afterwards, Belcher tells Max that his girlfriend, Nichole "Sparky" Hendrix (Anndi McAfee), was spotted investigating gang territory in Crankshaft Bay. Sparky contacts Max, telling him about map fragments she found with the names of Dr. Justice and Otto von Diesel (Noah Nelson) written on them. After traveling to the bay, collecting the map fragments, and rescuing Sparky from gang members, the map is taken to Gearhead for analysis. Dr. Justice asks Max to return to Crankshaft Bay to retrieve a data cube containing backup files for the Velocity X project, but their communications are intercepted by Metacog (Wingert), the gang's robotic assistant.

Max successfully secures the cube, but is accosted by Fast Lane Frascatti (Allison Levine), a gang member who challenges Max to a race for the uranium in exchange for information about Otto. Max learns that Otto was once a member of his father's engineering team, but was fired for bypassing safety protocols. Gearhead completes his analysis of the map, which depicts a meeting taking place at the Burnout Glacier volcano. Otto plans to collect volcanic gas, an ingredient in the Velocity X fuel, by triggering an eruption with a rocket. Max destroys the rocket before it launches, and retrieves Dr. Justice's own gas canister from within the volcano. Simon "Slick" Deluca (Wingert), another gang member, wagers the gas canister on a race with Max.

Gearhead completes his analysis of the backup data cube. The goal of the Velocity X project was vehicle-assisted time travel, but Dr. Justice ceased development due to risks associated with altering history. Otto plans to travel back in time to prevent the production of Hot Wheels cars and erase the Justice family from existence as revenge for his firing. Max is approached by Rupert Jacoby (Alaskey), Otto's right-hand man, who challenges Max to a race for the temporal transmission—the final Velocity X project component—and the Velocity X disks. However, during the race with Rupert, Otto's gang steals the transmission. With the assistance of Gearhead, Max tracks the gang to Monument City's Underworld, where he defeats Nitro, Belcher, Fast Lane, Slick, and Rupert, before battling Otto. Despite his defeat, Otto escapes police custody and remains at large, while Max returns to street racing.

== Development and release ==
Early concept art of the Turbine Sands location

In early 2001, THQ obtained an extended agreement with Mattel to produce video games based on the Hot Wheels intellectual property. After Beyond Games released Motor Mayhem in late 2001, THQ approached the studio to begin development of an untitled vehicular combat game using the Hot Wheels license. The team had created a new game engine from the ground up for Motor Mayhem called Brainstorm, and decided to use the same framework for the Hot Wheels project. The game was announced for Windows (PC), Game Boy Advance (GBA), PlayStation 2 (PS2), and GameCube the following year in January 2002 at THQ Editors' Day, with a launch window of Christmas 2002. The game was tentatively titled Hot Wheels 2002, and was described as a "mission-based racing adventure set in a dark, futuristic world." The project was originally developed for PS2 hardware, and took the team two weeks to port the game to GameCube. The GameCube's increased processing power also allowed for further enhancements, including an expanded color gamut, improved draw distance, and graphics rendered at 60 frames per second. The tone of the story was heavily inspired by Speed Racer, focusing on a "good versus bad guy dynamic", and the game's visuals were influenced by the Batman Beyond animated series.

Mattel's life-size Twin Mill replica at the E3 2002 Velocity X booth

On May 13, THQ announced its lineup for E3 2002, including the untitled Hot Wheels 2002 project. On May 20, an official THQ press release revealed the game's full title—Hot Wheels: Velocity X—for the first time. At E3 2002, THQ showcased the GBA, PS2, and GameCube versions of the game across multiple booths, accompanied by Mattel's life-size replica of the Hot Wheels Twin Mill model car. On August 2, THQ demonstrated a pre-alpha build of the game at the IGN headquarters. At this demonstration, Beyond Games suggested a simultaneous October 2002 release for all three versions of the game, and confirmed that only the GameCube version would include full 4-player co-op. According to Beyond Games vice president Clark Stacey, the development team was given much more creative freedom with the Hot Wheels license than Mattel had allowed in the past, resulting in the game's signature weapon designs and vehicle damage models.

Velocity X launched exclusively in North America (US) and PAL regions. The PC version of the game released on October 16. To promote the game, Mattel distributed a reskin of the Hot Wheels 40 Somethin' model car exclusive to Toys "R" Us—featuring decals of the THQ and Velocity X logos—bundled with the CD-ROM. On October 25, the development team announced that the home console versions of Velocity X had gone gold, with a projected launch date of November 12. THQ released Saffire's GBA version of the game on October 31 in the US and December 6 in PAL regions. The PS2 version released in the US on November 12 and PAL regions on November 29. The GameCube version released in the US on November 14 and PAL regions on December 13. In 2002, Mattel distributed a Velocity X PC demo disc with a limited edition run of Hot Wheels Racing Ferrari F2002 1:24 scale models. (Note: UPC 027084009200) In 2005, THQ released a two-in-one bundle including the GBA versions of Velocity X and Hot Wheels: World Race. (Note: UPC 785138322025)

== Reception ==
Reception

Aggregate scores
Aggregator	Score			
Aggregator	GBA	GameCube	PC	PS2
GameRankings	49%	49%	54%	55%
Metacritic	52/100	55/100	N/A	54/100

Review scores
Publication	Score			
Publication	GBA	GameCube	PC	PS2
Game Informer	N/A	N/A	N/A	6/10
GameSpot	6.4/10	N/A	N/A	7.1/10
GameSpy	1/5	N/A	N/A	2/5
GameStar	N/A	N/A	68%	N/A
GameZone	7.4/10	N/A	N/A	4.5/10
IGN	5.5/10	4.7/10	N/A	4.6/10
NGC Magazine	N/A	45/100	N/A	N/A
Nintendo Power	2.7/5	3.5/5	N/A	N/A
Official U.S. PlayStation Magazine	N/A	N/A	N/A	2.5/5
PC Games (DE)	N/A	N/A	69/100	N/A
PC Action	N/A	N/A	66%	N/A
Gamesmania.de	N/A	N/A	39%	N/A

Hot Wheels: Velocity X received "mixed" reviews on all platforms according to video game review aggregator website Metacritic.
