= Redline (1999 video game) =

1999 video game

- Developer: Beyond Games
- Publishers: Accolade (US); Electronic Arts (EU)
- Platform: Windows
- Release: NA: March 24, 1999
- Genres: Vehicular combat, first-person shooter
- Modes: Single-player, multiplayer

Redline is a 1999 post-apocalyptic combination first-person shooter/car combat game for Windows. It was developed by Beyond Games and published by Accolade. In Europe, the game is known as Redline - Gang Warfare: 2066. It is a spiritual successor to the Atari Lynx video game BattleWheels. The game was noted for allowing players to enter or exit vehicles during combat at anytime, thus combining the genres of car combat and first-person shooting. This was the last game Accolade published before being acquired by Infogrames.

== History ==
In early 1995, an updated version of the 1993 Atari Lynx handheld video game BattleWheels was announced. It was intended to be released on both PC and the Atari Jaguar in late 1995; however, developer Beyond Games was occupied with the fighting game Ultra Vortek. The Atari Jaguar was eventually discontinued in early 1996, and Beyond Games shifted its BattleWheels project to be primarily a PC game. They then decided to change the name of the game to Redline in 1997. It was initially going to be released at the end of 1997; however, the date got pushed back numerous times. The game was finally released in March 1999.

The game blends the two genres also found in its predecessor: car combat and first-person shooting. It contains a linear single-player storyline, which consists of the aftermath of an apocalypse, caused by wealthy corporations (Insiders) that were angered and financially damaged by the general public's (Outsiders) use of free orgone energy. The protagonist is an unnamed silent Outsider, who battles both Insiders and other gangs while increasing his reputation in a like-minded gang called The Company. Redline included support to be played online using the MPlayer.com and Heat.net online services. It was available for play on their demo version even before the game was released. After those companies shut down, servers were moved to GameSpy Arcade.

Shortly after release, the publisher, Accolade, was bought out by Infogrames. Due to the previous delays and also the new internal mergers, post-release support for Redline ceased after only one small official patch was released; thus, there was no way to edit or mod the game. Due to this, unlike other '90s PC games, only a small fan community has existed for the title.

A PlayStation version of the game was planned to be more action-intensive than the Windows version, but was eventually cancelled. Afterwards, a sequel/spinoff named Redline Arena was planned for the Dreamcast, but that too was cancelled. Elements from that project were worked into the PlayStation 2 game Motor Mayhem. Tommo purchased the rights to Redline and digitally published it through its Retroism brand in 2015; thus, the game was re-released on Steam and GOG.com, albeit unchanged from the original release.

== Reception ==
Reception

Aggregate score
Aggregator	Score
GameRankings	71%

Review scores
Publication	Score
CNET Gamecenter	4/10
Computer Games Strategy Plus	2.5/5
Computer Gaming World	3.5/5
Edge	4/10
GamePro	3.5/5
GameRevolution	B+
GameSpot	7.6/10
IGN	7.1/10
Next Generation	2/5
PC Accelerator	7/10
PC Gamer (US)	81%
PC PowerPlay	83%
PC Zone	79%
Personal Computer World	5/5

The game received above average reviews according to the review aggregation website GameRankings. Most reviewers praised the graphics and premise; however, they were divided on the gameplay itself (the blending of car combat and first-person shooting). Next Generation rated the game two stars out of five, and called it "a title that's a misfire all around. Combining two different types of gameplay into one game is a terrific idea, but someone should have mentioned that welding a mediocre first-person shooter onto a mediocre car-combat game is not the way to make the whole better than the sum of its parts." In contrast, Computer Gaming World rated the game three and a half stars out of five, and stated that "While other games have tried to mix vehicular and on-foot combat and done it badly (think Necrodome), Redline does a better job of blending the two into a flashy, fast-paced package."
