= Snoopy vs. the Red Baron =

Snoopy vs. the Red Baron or Snoopy and the Red Baron may refer to:

- Snoopy and the Red Baron (book), a best-selling cartoon book in 1966 by Charles M. Schulz, later adapted into a View-Master set
- "Snoopy vs. the Red Baron" (song), a single and an album by The Royal Guardsmen
- Snoopy vs. the Red Baron (video game), a 2006 game for PlayStation 2, PlayStation Portable, and PC
- Snoopy and the Red Baron (video game), a 1983 game for the Atari 2600
- a regular feature with the Peanuts character Snoopy
