= Jutland (disambiguation) =

Jutland is a peninsula that comprises the mainland part of Denmark and part of northern Germany.

Jutland may also refer to:

- Jutland, New Jersey, an unincorporated community in the United States
- Jutland horse, a horse breed
- Battle of Jutland, a World War I naval battle
- Jutland (board game), a 1967 Battle of Jutland wargame published by Avalon Hill
- Jutland (video game), a 2006 Battle of Jutland naval strategy game

== See also ==
- Jylland (ship), a Danish steam frigate
