= WOFF (disambiguation) =

Web Open Font Format is a font format for use in web pages.

WOFF, or Woff, may also refer to:

- Wings Over Flanders Fields, a 2013 combat flight simulation video game set in World War I
- World of Final Fantasy, a 2016 video game
- Jim Woff, member of the Australian rock band Crow
- a fictional species in the Hilda graphic novel series and TV series
