= CyberVirus =

2002 video game

- Developer: Beyond Games
- Publisher: Songbird Productions
- Platform: Atari Lynx
- Release: 2002
- Genre: First-person shooter
- Mode: Single-player

CyberVirus is a 2002 first-person shooter video game developed by Beyond Games and published by Songbird Productions for the Atari Lynx. It is a spiritual successor to Beyond Games' BattleWheels (1993). Originally planned to be released by Atari Corporation, it was cancelled after Beyond Games' bankruptcy in 1994. It was purchased and released by Songbird Productions in 2002. Levels from a prototype produced in 1993 was released by Songbird as CyberVirus: Lost Missions in 2020.

== Gameplay ==
The player roams open levels and shoots enemies until no enemies are left in a level. Structures that attack the player can also be destroyed. All enemies and structures are pinpointed on a map until they are all defeated.
