= Ultra Vortek =

1995 video game

- Cover art by Jim Meier
- Developer: Beyond Games
- Publisher: Atari Corporation
- Producer: Kris N. Johnson
- Designers: Curt Hatch; D. Christopher Salmon; Kris N. Johnson
- Programmer: Kris N. Johnson
- Artists: Dale Meier; Jim Meier
- Writer: Tim Huntsman
- Composer: William C. Walker
- Platform: Atari Jaguar
- Release: NA/EU: September 5, 1995
- Genre: Fighting
- Modes: Single-player, multiplayer

Ultra Vortek (also released as Ultra Vortex) is a fighting game developed by Beyond Games and published by Atari Corporation for the Atari Jaguar in North America and Europe on September 5, 1995. It was the second fighting game released for the Jaguar after Kasumi Ninja and unsuccessfully sought to capitalize on the trend of violent fighting games started by Midway Games's Mortal Kombat in 1992. It was the only officially released game that supports the unreleased Jaguar Voice Modem peripheral for online play.

Set in a dystopian future, Ultra Vortek follows seven fighters from three groups as they enter a tournament held by a demonic being known as the Guardian. He is protector of the titular ancient tablet that will grant full power to the winning victor capable of defeating him and save Earth from being consumed by the artifact. Its gameplay consists of one-on-one fights, with a main three-button configuration, featuring special moves and finisher techniques, as well as two playable modes.

After the launch of BattleWheels, Atari Corporation was impressed with the work of Beyond Games and invited their founder, Kris N. Johnson, to see their new hardware that would later become the Jaguar. Intrigued by the hardware specifications during this invitation, Johnson's company signed on to be one of the first third-party developers for the platform. Atari Corp. requested them to create a fighting game project and with the success of releases like Street Fighter II: The World Warrior and Mortal Kombat, the team settled on developing a title which combined several art styles to showcase the system's capabilities and would become Ultra Vortek.

Ultra Vortek garnered mixed reception from critics. Some praised the mixed visual style and audio department while others panned the slow controls, choppy character animation and gameplay, deeming it as a Mortal Kombat rip-off. A version for the Atari Lynx was also in development but never released, though Songbird Productions announced plans to publish it under the title Ultravore after acquiring the rights to the project from Beyond Games in 2000.

== Gameplay ==
Lucius defeating Skullcrusher after giving an uppercut.

Ultra Vortek is a fighting game featuring digitized graphics and sprites similar to Kasumi Ninja. The player fights against other opponents in one-on-one matches and the fighter who depletes the health bar of the opponent wins a bout. The first to win two bouts becomes the winner of the match. Each round is timed, which can be adjusted or deactivated in the game options; if both fighters still have health remaining when time expires, the fighter with more health wins the round. The game features four levels of difficulty. Although inaccessible during normal play, players can also activate a turbo mode for faster playing speed similar to Street Fighter II: Hyper Fighting via cheat code. In single-player mode, players can choose from seven playable characters and fight against computer-controlled fighters. A hidden character can be fought by fulfilling certain conditions. If all of the opponents are defeated on the Normal difficulty or higher, the player will be able to fight against the Guardian. Like in Mortal Kombat, special and death moves are performed by entering button commands while pressing the d-pad. The player can turn opponents into feces by performing a "Poopality", a finishing move which players execute against a defeated opponent. Multiplayer options include a local two-player versus mode and a network mode. When network mode is activated, players are required to dial each other with the Jaguar Voice Modem for online play.

== Plot ==
During an excavation process in South America in the mid-21st century, archaeologists unearthed an ancient tablet named the Ultra Vortek which referred to both its demonic protector known only as the Guardian and the "Time of Testing", an event where people would send their best fighters to combat against the Guardian to seize full power of the Vortek tablet. Failing in defeating him would result in their current society being consumed by the tablet, starting the cycle anew and bringing humanity into a loop until he was defeated. A hundred years after discovery of the artifact, civilization declined and nations across the world fell apart as a result. During this dystopian period, both science and technology advanced far enough for humans to develop robots designed to replace manual human labor for cost effectiveness. However, they become self-aware due to their own ability to reason and, after being enslaved for more than 50 years, form their own society. Conflict between humans and robots erupted afterwards.

Through the human cloning creation process, the Military Industrial Complex developed and designed a new race that would eventually replace soldiers due to their survival capabilities that surpassed humans. However, a great conflict that broke in the year 2112 lead to some of them escaping and forming their own collective underground gang. Very few gangs offer any allegiance to them because of their lack of a true leader and constantly changing opinions and views. As society continued to crumble, many humans joined gangs to rebel against the corrupt government and the rival gangs, with the largest of them residing in the underground and splitting into two factions, one of which possessed powers derived from the Vortek tablet that would cause friction between those who used hand-held weapons, whose tools were regarded by the former as poor substitutes.

At a certain time period, the Guardian reappears before humanity and announces that he will destroy the world, unless a warrior defeats him in violent combat. He allots a specific amount of time for humanity to select seven of their best fighters and have them compete against one another. Once the fighter defeats the other warriors, he will open the "Ultra Vortek", combat the Guardian, and if victorious, may then use his newly acquired power to determine the fate of Earth.

== Development ==
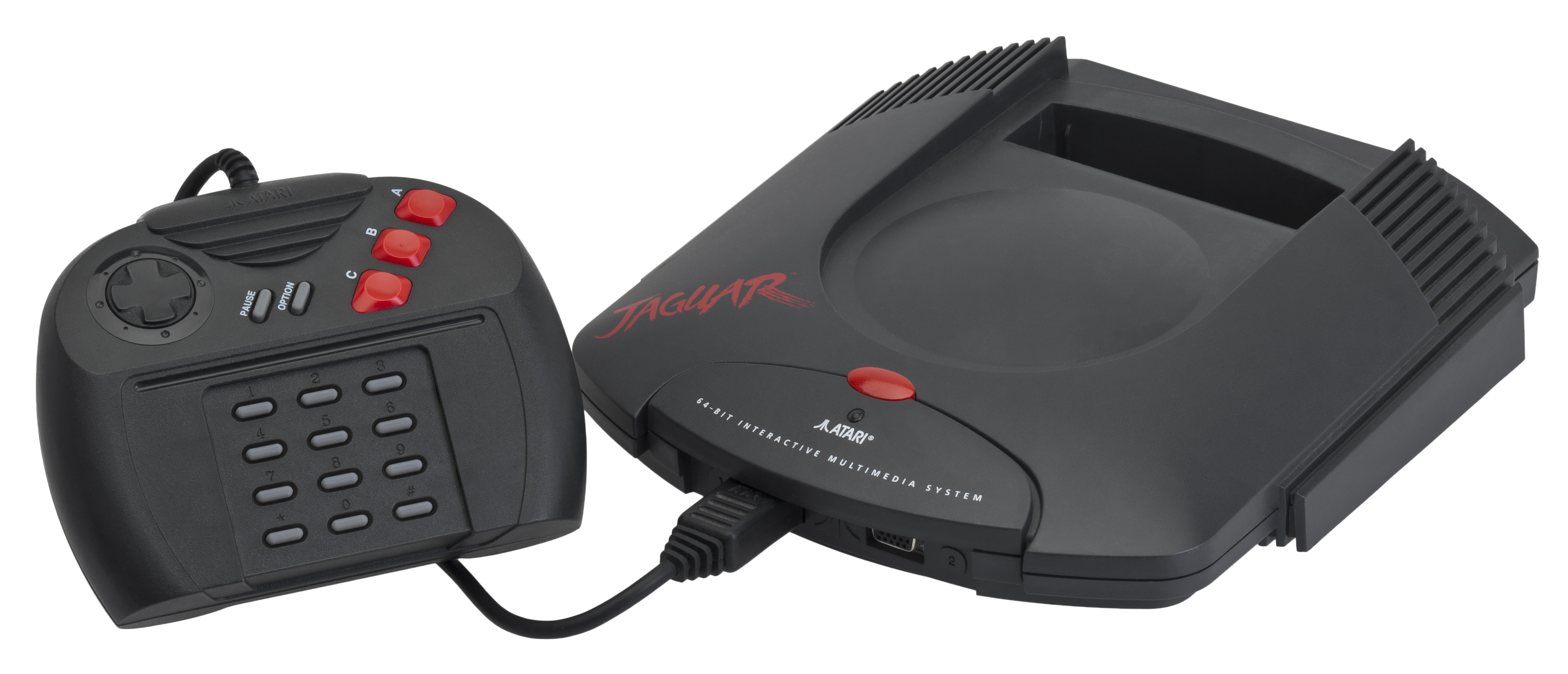
Ultra Vortek spent well over a year in development and became the only title developed by Beyond Games released for the Atari Jaguar.

Atari Corporation was impressed enough by Beyond Games' BattleWheels (1993) on the Atari Lynx that they invited Beyond Games founder Kris N. Johnson to see their upcoming home video game console (the Jaguar) in development. Beyond Games was preparing to move onto another platform and develop new projects at the time, so Johnson visited and was intrigued by the hardware specifications on the new console. Beyond Games signed with Atari Corp. to be one of the first third-party developers for the console and they received software development kits that included several demos for it months later. Johnson began to disassemble the demo source code to slowly build an understanding of the hardware architecture, eventually managing to make a scrolling background demo with full-color support.

Beyond Games originally had plans to release an updated conversion of BattleWheels as one of their first titles for the Jaguar. However, Atari requested them to create a fighting game instead. After the success of both Street Fighter II: The World Warrior and Mortal Kombat, the team decided that a digitized one-on-one fighter would serve as a positive showcase for the hardware and their creative efforts.

During a brainstorming session, Johnson and designer Curt Hatch determined that some of their ideas for the company's next project would be unachievable with digitized actors. Hatch and artist William Clark Walker were developing computer-animated character concepts, which lead the team in creating a fighting game project by combining digitized actors along with stop-motion models and computer-animated characters that would become Ultra Vortek, albeit with limited resources. Moving from hand-drawn graphics to digitized images, motion capture and 3D modeling represented a big leap for Beyond Games. Johnson contacted artist Jim "Meats" Meier, who was experimenting with 3D art, to recruit him after seeing his artwork locally and the project became Jim Meier's first work in the video game industry.

The development of Ultra Vortek reportedly took over a year with an estimated budget of nearly US$100,000. It was described by writer Tim Huntsman as "very indie", as most of the team had several roles during this process. Johnson served as the game's sole programmer in addition to being producer. His background with martial arts helped during the design and creation of the characters. Jim Meier was art director and responsible for the stage artwork and cover art. Both Hatch and Walker, as well as D. Christopher Salmon and Chris Hansen, designed the characters and costumes used by the actors. Dale Meier and Walker were responsible for composing the soundtrack and making sound effects, respectively. Huntsman wrote the scenario, assisted with gameplay design, and lent his voice for The Guardian.

After the characters were designed and Jim Meier began working on backgrounds early in development, the team started filming the actors with a blue screen at a warehouse. There were several problems that occurred during this phase, such as with the lighting equipment, that led to various character costume elements being scrapped. They eventually moved to the "Bar and Grill" nightclub owned by Johnson, due to its large space that allowed actors to move more freely. Four of the playable characters were digitized live-action actors, two of whom had no previous experience in martial arts. Both Buzzsaw and Lucius were played by Huntsman and Clark Stacey respectively, while former bouncer Lamont Hanna portrayed Dreadloc and volleyball player Toni Fitzgerald acted as Volcana. Fitzgerald also brought some of her own costumes for the character as well.

Both Grok and Mercury were pre-rendered 3D characters by Hatch and Walker, while Skullcrusher and The Guardian were made by Chris Salmon as 14-inch models that would later be filmed through the process of stop motion animation. Afterwards, both Huntsman and Dale Meier edited and cleaned the films to provide the necessary frames to animate the characters within the game. Bruce Johnson applied finishing touches to some scenes.

=== Atari Lynx version ===
Gameplay screenshot from the unreleased Ultra Vortex for Atari Lynx.

A version of Ultra Vortek featuring hand-drawn graphics was in development by Beyond Games for the Atari Lynx under its original Ultra Vortex name. It was intended to be released as part of a planned relaunch of the Lynx if the Jaguar proved to be successful on the market. The game was only displayed for versus play once at Atari's booth during Summer CES in 1994, where it featured one stage and two playable characters.

The Lynx version was left unreleased due to the Jaguar's lack of commercial and critical success. Carl Forhan of Songbird Productions, who had interest in completing the project, contacted Johnson in regards to his unfinished projects for the system and eventually picked up their rights for distribution. Johnson sold his original development equipment and source code to the company, and the game was renamed to Ultravore. A prototype of this incarnation also exists but has yet to be released online. Several emulated screenshots have been made available to the public for viewing.

== Release ==
Ultra Vortek originally went under the name Ultra Vortex and was announced in early 1994. It was first showcased to the public at Summer Consumer Electronics Show (CES) of the same year, featuring only four playable characters and different stage visuals compared to the final release. The game was originally intended to be released in December 1994 and was later featured in the Do The Math promotional recording sent by Atari Corporation to video game retail stores in a more advanced state of completion, closely resembling the final version.

From early 1995 up until its eventual release, the game was showcased across several events such as Winter CES 1995, Spring ECTS '95 and E3 1995. The latter was its last trade show appearance ahead of its Q3 1995 release. The game suffered a series of delays, missing its original February 1995 release date and was pushed back month after month, before finally being released on September 5, 1995. These delays were due to refining gameplay and technical issues with development tools.

Ultra Vortek is the only Jaguar game that support the Jaguar Voice Modem. The device was announced in 1994 at the Consumer Electronics Show by Atari, as a partnership up with Phylon, Inc. to create the device. The unit was delayed and eventually in 1995 mass production was canceled altogether, but not before an estimated 100 or so were made. The unit used a 19.9 kbit/s dial up modem and had the ability to answer incoming phone calls and store up to 18 phone numbers. Players were required to directly dial each other for online game play.

== Reception ==
Reception

Review scores
Publication	Score
AllGame	3/5
Edge	3 / 10
Game Players	62%
Next Generation	3/5
Video Games (DE)	45%
Games World	80%
Game Zero Magazine	27.5 / 50
ST Magazine	77%
Última Generación	70 / 100
Ultimate Future Games	21%
VideoGames	7 / 10
X Gen	15 / 100

Award
Publication	Award
GameFan (1994)	Best Fighting (Jaguar)

Ultra Vortek was met with mixed reception from critics.

GamePro praised the game's "impressive" graphics and the ease of executing special moves, but gave it an overall negative assessment based on its lack of original elements. They concluded that "Ultra Vortex is a great game for someone who hasn't seen Killer Instinct, Mortal Kombat II, or Super Street Fighter. But if you've seen and played those games, you've seen more than Ultra Vortex has to offer."

Next Generation stated that "Though this game is unoriginal and suffers from slow control, you forgive Ultra Vortek because of the overall good job (graphics, tone, and gore) Beyond Games has done with the borrowed concept."

== Legacy ==
In October 2003, a nearly complete prototype ROM image of Ultra Vortek was made freely available to download by website AtariAge with permission from Beyond Games. Buzzsaw, Grok and Volcana would re-appear as guest characters in Motor Mayhem for PlayStation 2.
