= Tierney Thys =

American marine biologist (1966–2026)

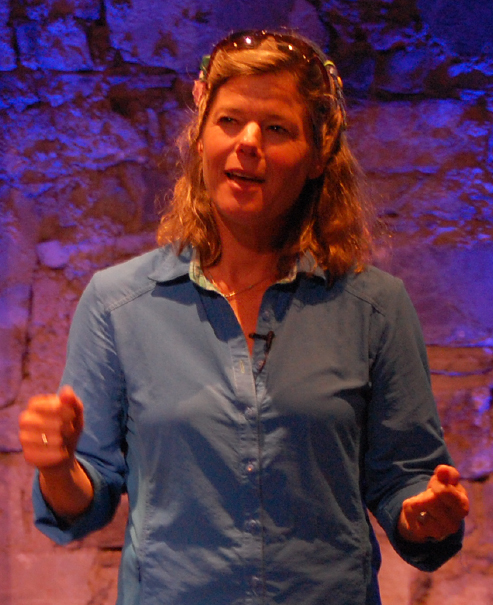
- Thys in 2014
- Born: December 31, 1966; San Leandro, California, U.S.
- Died: March 6, 2026 (aged 59); Carmel, California, U.S.
- Education: PhD Biomechanics, Duke University; BS Biology, Brown University
- Occupations: Biologist, filmmaker
- Known for: National Geographic Explorer

Tierney Michelle Thys (December 31, 1966 – March 6, 2026) was an American marine biologist, science educator and National Geographic explorer. In 1988 she earned a degree in biology from Brown University, and in 1998 she earned a doctorate in biomechanics. She was also the director of research at the Sea Studios Foundation. She was also the science editor for The Shape of Life and director for Strange Days on Planet Earth. She had also written, narrated and produced short films. Since 2000 she and her colleagues had been studying the giant ocean sunfish (mola). In 2004 she was named a National Geographic "Emerging Explorer". She later joined National Geographic expeditions and developed a National Geographic children's television conservation series.

Thys delivered two TED talks, "Swim with the giant sunfish", and "The secret life of plankton". As of 2015 she was producing an online series for TEDed titled Stories from the Sea.

Tierney Thys founded Around the world in 80 Fabrics- a multi-media educational non-profit fostering connections between plastic-free fabrics and planetary health.

A chapter of Earth Heroes: Champions of the Ocean, by Fran Hodgkins, is about her, and she is briefly profiled in Girls Research!: Amazing Tales of Female Scientists. Science Methods and Process Skills: Meet Tierney Thys, National Geographic Emerging Explorer, by Kathy Cabe Trundle, was published by National Geographic School Publishing in 2011. A virtual aquarium in the educational game Animal Jam Classic and Animal Jam is named after her. It features videos where she talks about marine life and answers questions from the game's players (called Jammers). After Thys' passing, Animal Jam Classic added an Ocean Sunfish as a memorial.

She was also a certified pilot and diver. Thys died on March 6, 2026, at the age of 59.

== Her work ==
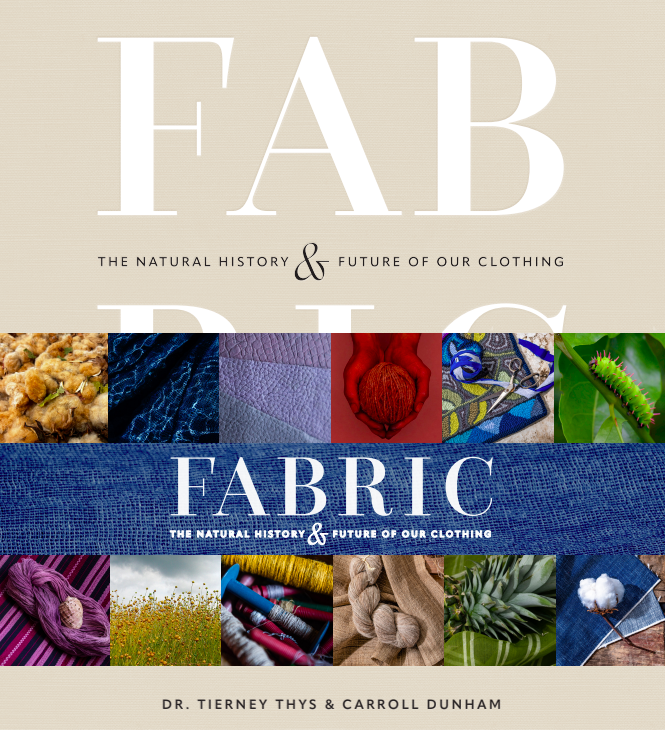
Fabric: The Natural History and Future of Clothing

Fabric: The Natural History and Future of Clothing is a forthcoming nonfiction book by medical anthropologist Carroll Dunham and marine biologist Tierney Thys, scheduled for publication by Insight Press in February 2027. The book explores the ecological, cultural, and evolutionary history of textiles, as well as the future of clothing in a post-petroleum world.

The book emerged from the interdisciplinary collaboration between Dunham and Thys, combining perspectives from anthropology, ecology, and marine science. Their work reflected a shared interest in biodiversity, material culture, and the human relationship with natural systems.

Dunham, a medical anthropologist based in Nepal for over three decades, has conducted extensive fieldwork among Indigenous and nomadic communities across the Himalayas, Mongolia, and South Asia. Her research focuses on traditional ecological knowledge, textile practices, and cultural resilience.

Thys, a National Geographic Explorer and marine biologist, was known for her research on ocean ecosystems and her efforts to communicate marine science to broad audiences.

The book is also closely linked to the nonprofit initiative Around the World in 80 Fabrics, co-founded by Dunham and Thys in 2021. The organization promotes awareness of natural fibers, biodiversity, and alternatives to synthetic textiles.
