= Kasumi Ninja =

1994 video game

- Cover art by Steve Lang
- Developer: Hand Made Software
- Publishers: NA/EU: Atari Corporation; JP: Messe Sanoh, Inc.
- Producers: Jim Gregory; Ted Taquechi
- Designers: Hank Cappa; Joe Sousa
- Programmers: Mark Lyhan; Nob Nicholson; Pete Wiseman
- Artists: Andy Johnson; Greg Irwing; Martin Kilmer
- Composer: Stephen Lord
- Platform: Atari Jaguar
- Release: NA: 21 December 1994; EU: 21 December 1994; JP: July 1995
- Genre: Fighting
- Modes: Single-player, multiplayer

Kasumi Ninja is a fighting game developed by Hand Made Software and published by Atari Corporation for the Atari Jaguar. It was first released in North America and Europe on December 21, 1994, and was later released in Japan by Messe Sanoh in July 1995. It was the first fighting title to be released for the Jaguar, and unsuccessfully sought to capitalize on the trend of ultra violent fighting games started by Midway Games's Mortal Kombat in 1992.

When the elder ninja Gyaku kills two of his fellow elders through black magic and becomes possessed by a powerful demon after breaking the gate to the underworld, it is up to the player to assume the role of any of the playable characters in order to defeat other opponents before Lord Gyaku destroys the Earth. Being one of the first titles announced for the Jaguar before it was launched to the public in November 1993, Kasumi Ninja was created by the same company who previously developed Dracula the Undead for the Atari Lynx in 1991 and had a troubled development process, undergoing various changes before release. It was also one of the first games to feature a parental lockout system, allowing censorship and limiting the violence displayed during gameplay.

Kasumi Ninja received mixed to negative reception when it was released. While it received praise for its visuals, critics panned the controls, sound and slow gameplay, with many reviewers calling it a Mortal Kombat rip-off. By April 1, 1995, the game had sold more than 24,000 copies though it is unknown how many were sold in total during its lifetime. A sequel, Kasumi Ninja II, was in development for the Atari Jaguar CD but it was cancelled.

== Gameplay ==
Senzo defeating Alaric through a roundhouse kick.

Kasumi Ninja is a fighting game featuring digitized graphics and sprites with pseudo-3D battlegrounds using parallax scrolling, where the player fights against other opponents in one-on-one matches. The fighter who manages to deplete the health bar of the opponent wins the first bout and the first to win two bouts becomes the winner of the match. Each round is timed, which can be adjusted at the options menu screen, and if both fighters still have health remaining when time is over, the one with more health wins that round. The game features four levels of difficulty that can be selected on both the main and options menu screen, while also featuring four levels of gore display to choose from on the options menu, with Gore Fest being the highest and the only mode where characters can trigger their respective death moves, among other settings. The game also features a parental lockout system where parents can censor the level of violence displayed during gameplay by entering a six-digit password with the controller's keypad.

In the single-player mode, only two characters are selectable at the beginning, while more characters are unlocked by defeating the computer in a series of one-on-one matches. If the player manages to defeat all of the opponents in the lowest difficulty, the player will not be able to fight against Gyaku but he can be faced on the Normal difficulty, although his demonic form can only be challenged in the higher difficulties. Depending on the difficulty selected, the player is given a number of continues before getting a game over screen. Similar to Mortal Kombat, special and death moves are performed by holding the C button while pressing the d-pad. The game's blocking system also works similarly to Mortal Kombat, where the player still receives damage when blocking physical and projectile attacks. A unique feature of the game is the functionality of the health bar during gameplay, which is a katana and spills blood into the battleground when the character gets damaged. The game also features a two-player versus mode.

== Plot ==
The Kasumi island has spawned some of the most renowned warriors seen in the world, while also remaining hidden from eyes of the modern world within the mist that surrounds it due to Preeminent Celestials, making those who find the place uninvited never being heard from again. Those on the island are trained both in body and spirit at the Dragon Cloud temple by three wise and capable elder ninjas, with each one representing an aspect of humanity and due to the balance of good and evil between them, it allows the gate to the netherworld remain close but one of the eldest ninjas on the island, Gyaku, kills both Hiei and Kaioh, the other two elder ninjas, fracturing the alignment of the cosmic forces and opening the gate to the underworld in the process, resulting in Gyaku becoming possessed by a powerful demon capable of destroying the Earth. As a result, the player takes the role of either fighter chosen by the Celestials in order to defeat Lord Gyaku and restore balance to the universe.

== Development and release ==
Originally codenamed Ninja Puncher early in development, Kasumi Ninja was developed by UK-based developer Hand Made Software, who previously developed titles such as Dracula the Undead on the Atari Lynx and became one of the first titles announced for the then-upcoming Jaguar, featuring a completely different visual style compared to the one featured in the final version and was planned to have a roster of 20 playable characters instead of eight. The reason given in regards to the final character roster by former Hand Made Software producer Jim Gregory is due to meddling from Atari Corporation, removing much of the characters and other elements that were previously developed for the title, in addition of reducing memory size for the game cartridge. The game appeared at both Spring ECTS '94 and SCES '94 in a playable state, now sporting digitized graphics and sprites as with the final release. Kasumi Ninja was first released on December 21, 1994 and was later released in Japan by Messe Sanoh on July of the next year. Some copies of the game came with a headband accessory branded with the game's logo.

== Reception ==
Reception

Aggregate score
Aggregator	Score
GameRankings	10%

Review scores
Publication	Score
Next Generation	1/5
AllGame	2/5
Atari Gaming Headquarters	2 / 10
Atari Inside	82%
Computer and Video Games	51 / 100
Consoles +	73%
Excalibur	72%
Game Players	40%
GamePro	13 / 20
Games World	24 / 100
Jaguar	65%
Joypad	65%
MAN!AC	39%
Mega Fun	48%
Play Time	48%
ST-Computer	80%
ST Magazine	74 / 100
Super Game Power	3.5 / 5.0; 3.8 / 5.0
Última Generación	25 / 100
Ultimate Future Games	38%
Video Games	69%
VideoGames	4 / 10

The game received a mixed-to-negative response from critics. It has been criticized for being a blatant rip-off of Mortal Kombat (including gameplay, digitized graphics and graphic violence) with poor controls. GamePro commented that the graphics are technically impressive, but often unpleasant to look at due to aesthetic choices such as the palette swapped characters, the massive blood drops, and Angus's kilt-lifting move. They also criticized the controls, the music, and the announcer's voice, and concluded "Kasumi's a 64-bit warrior destined to remain in the shadows of deeper 16-bit fighting games."

Next Generation gave it one star out of five, calling it "a tragic example when good ideas are poorly executed" and citing "jerky animation", "sluggish control" and "baffling gameplay mechanics that discourage close-up fighting". Conversely, German website Atari Inside scored it 82%, praising the graphics and gameplay but criticizing the animation. ST-Computer also reviewed the game positively, giving a score of 80%, with commendations on graphics but low views on animation.

Brazilian magazine SuperGamePower gave the game 3.5 out of 5 for sharp graphics and large move set. French magazine Consoles+ scored the game 73%, approving the original style in performing moves and option to adjust the amount of blood spilling (although a second reviewer criticized the game's slowness, and that the game's quality is more SNES than Jaguar).

In a retrospective review, AllGame praised the game's visuals, but criticized the controller and concluded the game to be no more than "a horrible cash-in" Mortal Kombat clone that "should be ignored by all but the most devoted 64-bit Atari Jaguar fans." GamePro summarized that "Kasumi Ninja was a terrible, terrible Jaguar title - bad controller, bad controls, terrible menu set, forgettable characters, and an utterly unoriginal premise - that, thankfully, history has forgotten."

In 2009, Topless Robot ranked it as the fourth worst Mortal Kombat rip-off. In 2011, UGO.com included it in their list of the 102 worst games of all time. That same year, Complex called it "one of the worst Jaguar games ever released in a sea of awful Jaguar games." In 2012, Complex also ranked it as the fourth worst fighting game of all time, adding, "It was hard choosing amongst Ultra Vortek, Fight for Life, and Kasumi Ninja for the worst Jaguar fighting game, but we're going to go with the last one mentioned because it's probably the most famous. And also the worst." Kasumi Ninja is also listed in Digital Press's "50 Awful Games."

== Cancelled Sequel ==
A sequel, Kasumi Ninja II, was in development for the Atari Jaguar CD after the first game was released but it was cancelled after Atari Corp. closed its doors, making Hand Made Software lose money in the process.
