= Warbirds (video game) =

- Cover art in all regions
- Developer: Atari Corporation
- Publisher: Atari Corporation
- Designer: Robert Zdybel
- Programmer: Robert Zdybel
- Artists: Melody Rondeau; Susan G. McBride
- Composer: Robert Vieira
- Platform: Atari Lynx
- Release: NA: May 1991; EU: 1991
- Genres: Combat flight simulator, first-person shooter
- Modes: Single-player, multiplayer

Warbirds is a 1991 first-person combat flight simulation video game developed and published by Atari Corporation in North America and Europe exclusively for the Atari Lynx. Taking place in the 1910s during World War I, players assume the role of a rookie aircraft pilot from the Army Air Force who joined the titular squadron taking control of a prebuilt biplane in order to win the war against the enemies. Its gameplay mainly consists of dogfights against either AI-controlled opponents or other human players using the Lynx's ComLynx system, with a main four-button configuration.

Warbirds was written and designed by Atari veteran Robert Zdybel, who dedicated the project to his father. The game garnered positive reception from critics and reviewers alike who praised the presentation, pseudo-3D visuals, sound design, controls and gameplay. Its multiplayer support received unanimous praise but the single-player offering was noted to be one of the title's negative points. It also served as an inspiration for Beyond Games' 1993 BattleWheels.

== Gameplay ==
Gameplay screenshot.

Warbirds is a first-person combat flight simulation game where players assume the role of a World War I fighter pilot taking control of a biplane, with the main objective being the elimination of enemies to win the war. A variety of options can be altered to aid in shooting down enemy planes, including turning on unlimited ammunition and altering how much damage the player's aircraft can take until it explodes and players can also choose their preferred style of play for the plane before starting. When playing, the players has the ability to look ahead, behind, above, and to the left or right of their plane to detect oncoming enemies in the playfield. The game has five scenarios in which the player can fly against up to three enemy pilots of varying levels of skill. Up to four players can compete against each other by connecting four Atari Lynx units via the ComLynx port.

== Development and release ==
The creation of Warbirds was spearheaded by designer and Atari veteran Robert Zdybel, who dedicated the project to his father and he previously worked on several titles such as Stellar Track for the Atari 2600. The game was originally titled Red Baron and was planned for a Q4 1990 release, before being renamed in 1991. Previews of the game touted multiplayer support for up to six players instead of four. It was also on display for playing at Atari Corp.'s booth during the Winter Consumer Electronics Show in 1991.

== Reception ==
Reception

Review scores
Publication	Score
AllGame	4/5
Computer and Video Games	84 / 100
Dragon	4.5/5
Electronic Gaming Monthly	27 / 40
GamePro	24 / 25
IGN	9.0 / 10
ACE	836 / 1000
Aktueller Software Markt	6 / 12
Atari Gaming Headquarters	9 / 10
Consoles +	90%
Games-X	4/5
Hobby Consolas	93 / 100
Joypad	80%
Joystick	86%
Play Time	80%
Power Play	60%
Raze	86%
Video Games	61%

Warbirds was met with positive reception. The game was reviewed in 1992 in Dragon #181 by Hartley, Patricia, and Kirk Lesser in "The Role of Computers" column. The reviewers gave the game a positive review awarding it 4½ out of 5 stars. Computer and Video Games reviewed Warbirds in their August 1991 issue stating "There isn't a lot of variety to the gameplay but what's there is good for a while." Giving it an overall score of 84 out of 100. Raze also reviewed the game giving a score of 86%. Robert A. Jung reviewed the game which was published to IGN Entertainment, In his final verdict he wrote "Warbirds is designed and written by Robert Zdybel, a newcomer to Lynx game design; He dedicates the game to his father, and it's a worthy piece of gaming to be proud of. It's a game that's simple in concept and fun to play. Throw in true simulator realism, a variety of options, and the ability for four-player competition, and the sum is greater than its parts. For the video gamer looking for realistic aerial action, Warbirds leaves eveything else behind." Giving a final score of 9 out of 10.
