= BattleWheels =

1993 video game

- Cover art by Curt Hatch
- Developer: Beyond Games
- Publisher: Atari Corporation
- Programmer: Kris N. Johnson
- Artist: Lorin Nelson
- Composers: Curtis Coalson; Tim Huntsman
- Platform: Atari Lynx
- Release: NA: June 1993; EU: 1993
- Genres: vehicular combat, First-person shooter
- Modes: Single-player, multiplayer

BattleWheels is a 1993 first-person vehicular combat video game developed by Beyond Games and published by Atari Corporation for the Atari Lynx. The first project to be created by Beyond Games, the game takes place in a dystopian future where civilization has been reduced to a Mad Max-inspired landscape and players take the wheel of heavily armed and armored cars called Hi-Tech in order to compete against either computer-controlled opponents or other human players using the Lynx's ComLynx system in matches set across multiple post-apocalyptic locations.

BattleWheels was conceived by Beyond Games founder Kris N. Johnson, who had the idea of developing a vehicular combat game along with his colleagues after playing several multiplayer titles on the Lynx such as Warbirds, which would later become a source of inspiration for the project alongside Steve Jackson Games' Car Wars. After the release of the platform in 1989, Johnson contacted Atari Corp. in order to pitch them titles that focused on the console's multiplayer aspect. They later agreed and signed Johnson's company as a licensed developer for the Lynx.

BattleWheels was released to positive reception from critics, who praised the pseudo-3D visuals, sound design, gameplay and multiplayer for up to six people, although the lack of in-game music during matches was noted as a negative point. Updated conversions for both the Atari Jaguar and PC were in development but never released. Although it never received a direct sequel, Beyond Games would go on to develop Redline and Motor Mayhem for Microsoft Windows and PlayStation 2 respectively, which are considered spiritual successors to the game.

== Gameplay ==
Gameplay screenshot.

BattleWheels is a first-person vehicular combat game similar to Interstate '76 and Twisted Metal where players assume the role of warriors taking the wheel of heavily armored automobiles in an attempt to kill other opponents at the titular sport to emerge as a winning victor of the match. The game takes place in a post-apocalyptic dystopia on the year 2019, where the world has been reduced to a Mad Max-inspired setting and humanity has now turned towards more violent sports for entertainment as a result of both technological advancements and nationwide reorganization of the political structure that led to the creation of new kinds of sports, with the titular BattleWheels being the most popular of all. This arena-based combat sport pits up to six warriors dueling each other and driving heavily armored vehicles named Hi-Tech in order to kill the other opponents to emerge victorious.

There are only two modes of play to choose from at the main menu: "Action" is arcade-style mode that allows players to select a prebuilt car and battle against rivals in a successive manner across several locations. "Custom" mode, as the name implies, let the players customize their own vehicle with new parts, engine, weapons and other improvements that are bought with cash obtained after winning a match, although there is the choice of building a new car from the ground up or buy a prebuilt model before starting, among other options. Prior to starting a match in either mode, players have the option of choosing an arena to battle in and adjust multiple default settings such as the difficulty level for AI-controlled opponents, their number during single-player, number of kills to be reached, and player character. Controlling the vehicle is done with the D-pad; Up and down accelerates or decelerates the car respectively, while left and right turns its direction. The A button fires the currently selected weapon and changing between other weapons is executed by holding down Option 1 and pressing the direction where said weapon was located on the car, but holding down the button on its own toggles between weapons as well. The B button shows the map radar that displays the location of rivals on the current area and holding it down changes between multiple views by pressing the desired direction, while pressing up when holding down the button informs how much damage the vehicle has sustained.

The game also incorporates first-person shooter elements, as players can exit out of the vehicle by holding down Option 2 and their player character are still armed with two weapons for offensive or defensive purposes against opponents. While on foot, players can also hijack empty rival vehicles and collect moneybags on the arena, which is only possible when playing in "Custom" mode. However, being on foot is also risky, as the player's character can be hit by a running car, although they can be dodged by holding Option 2 and pressing any direction. The vehicle will catch fire after sustaining too much damage, leaving it unusable for the rest of the match and players must get out as a result. Pausing the game stops the battle and the pause screen displays the player's current status in the match. Up to six players can compete against each other by connecting six Atari Lynx units via the system's ComLynx port during the title screen in either single or team deathmatches.

== Development and release ==
Beyond Games was established between 1991 and 1992 by Kris N. Johnson, an avid video game player and self-taught programmer who had aspirations of entering into the video game industry during the 1980s. Johnson began coding with Atari BASIC on the Atari 8-bit computers and slowly built an understanding in how to program games and despite reaching several companies to publish his works, none of them ever reached the market after multiple unsuccessful attempts. Johnson also sent various letters to Nintendo and Sega in order to obtain a development kit for developing titles on their systems, but neither replied to his inquiries. After Atari Corporation released the Atari Lynx in 1989, he took an interest towards the system and proceeded to contact Atari Corp in order to propose them several projects that focused on the console's multiplayer capabilities, which they eventually agreed to and offered Johnson a development kit for US$1000, becoming a licensed developer for the platform in the process despite his lack of professional experience in the field. Prior to his venture in video game development, however, Johnson was also the owner of a nightclub during his youth along with a colleague that would later part ways with him. It also served as a mean of recruiting staff for his company, among them being future WildWorks CEO Clark Stacey and designer Tim Huntsman, both of which would later play a role during the creation of BattleWheels.

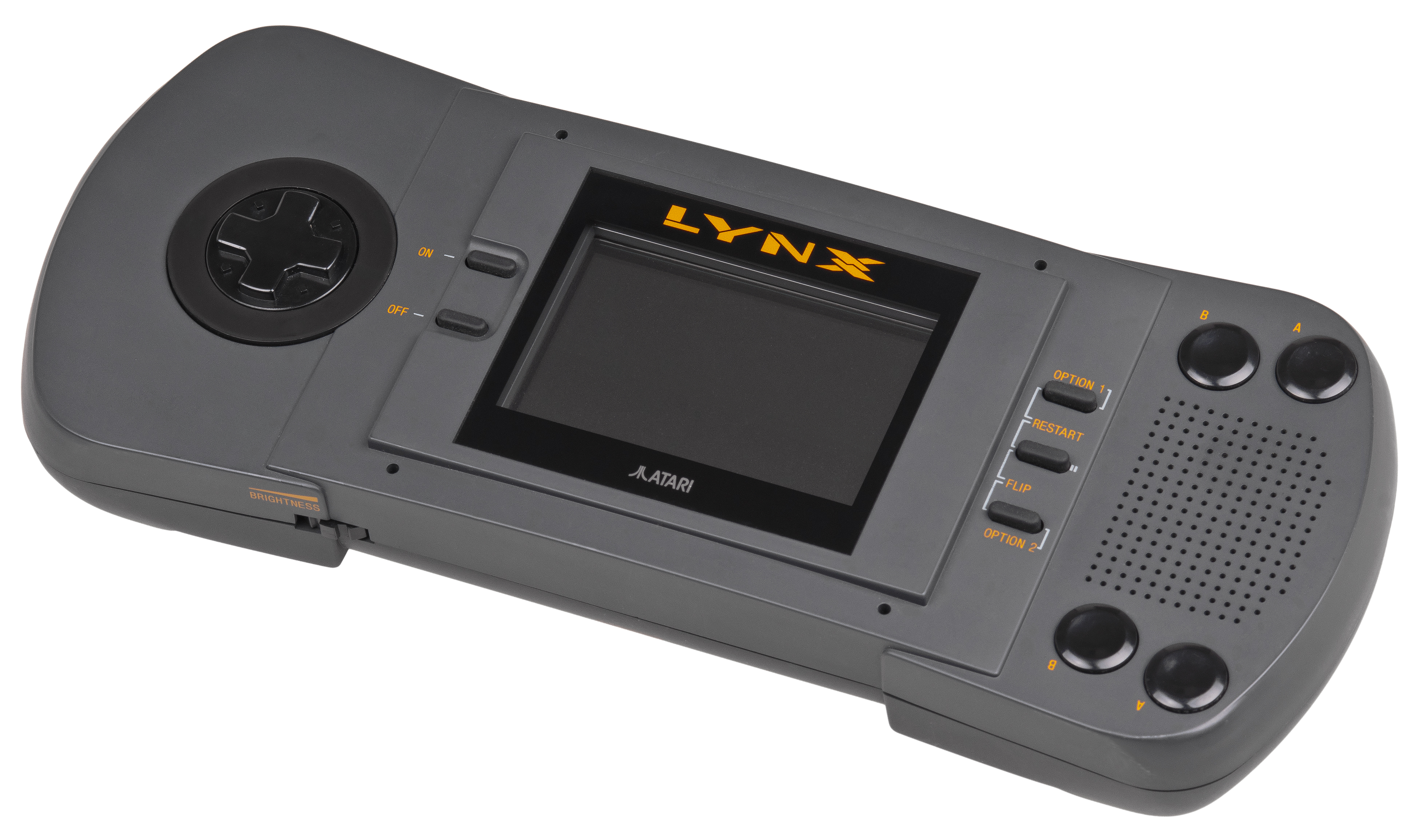
Warbirds served as a source of inspiration for BattleWheels and made heavy use of the Atari Lynx hardware.

At Beyond Games, Johnson developed various multiplayer prototype titles for the Atari Lynx on his own during the day before bringing them along with several Lynx units for testing purposes with colleagues on his nightclub. He and his friends played various games on the platform such as Epyx's Todd's Adventures in Slime World and Atari's Warbirds, with the latter serving as a source of ideas for him due to its showcase of the console's multiplayer capabilities that would lead to the conception of BattleWheels as a result. Johnson desired to develop a vehicular combat game project after obtaining a development kit for the system and Huntsman, who is also an avid tabletop player of games like Car Wars, offered his help in developing the project. Johnson intended the title to be easy to play but hard to master for both casual and hardcore players, in addition to pushing the hardware as much as he could from the beginning of its development in terms of graphics and multiplayer.

The programming and sound effects of BattleWheels were handled solely by Johnson, while the hand-drawn graphics were created by artist Lorin Nelson and the cover art for packaging was drawn by Curt Hatch. Both Curtis Coalson and Huntsman composed the music, while the latter designed more arenas and wrote the instruction manual after joining the company. The game spent half a year being tested by Johnson and his colleagues, along with a group of volunteers who were recruited via online forum posts in order to refine its gameplay before release.

BattleWheels was first showcased to attendees at the Consumer Electronics Show in 1993 and planned to be released in early 1994, with Huntsman promoting the game disguised as one of the playable characters to positive reception before being released to the general public on the same year late into the life span of the Lynx, becoming the first commercially released game to be created by Beyond Games.

== Reception ==
Reception

Review scores
| Publication | Score |
|---|---|
| IGN | 9.0 / 10 |
| AllGame | 4.5/5 |
| Digital Press | 8 / 10 |
| GamePro | 15 / 20 |
| Mega Fun | 61% |
| Video Games | 54% |
| VideoGames & Computer Entertainment | 9 / 10 |

Award
| Publication | Award |
|---|---|
| Consumer Electronics Show (1993) | Innovations Award |

In their June 1993 issue, GameFan gave positive remarks to the title in regards of its visuals and compared it with Warbirds.

BattleWheels has been met with positive reception from critics since its release. Chris Bieniek wrote in VideoGames & Computer Entertainment that BattleWheels effectively combines elements from Warbirds, BattleTech Centers, and the Mad Max film series. While highly praising the scaling effects and effective implementation of the Comlynx, his review focused mainly on the numerous features and resulting depth of the gameplay, noting elements such as the use of stereo sound to clue the player in to the locations of opponents and missiles, the customizable weapons setup, and ability to obscure the windshields of opponents. He summed up that "Though it sounds contradictory to the theme of ... a fast-paced, violent game, Battlewheels is also a game of subtlety," and gave it a 9 out of 10. While GamePro's Boss Music was also impressed with the graphics and features, he felt the gameplay was too repetitive to sustain interest during the single-player mode, especially with the lack of music. He recommended gamers buy it only if they had someone else to play it with. Robert Jung reviewed the game which was published to IGN Entertainment. In his final verdict he went on to say "the best implementation of the "Car Wars" idea I've ever seen on any computer or video game console." Giving the game 9 out of 10.

== Legacy ==
After the release of BattleWheels on the Atari Lynx, Atari Corporation was impressed with the work of Beyond Games and Gary Tramiel invited Kris Johnson, whose company was preparing to move into another platform to develop new projects, in seeing their new upcoming home video game console that would later become the Jaguar and after Johnson became intrigued by the hardware specifications during this invitation, his company was signed by Atari Corp. to be one of the first third-party developers for the console and an updated conversion of the game was intended to be one of their first titles for the platform alongside Ultra Vortek.

BattleWheels for the Jaguar was repeatedly touted to be an upcoming title for the platform that was being developed by Beyond Games, with plans to be released in 1994 before being pushed back for 1995. After the completion of Ultra Vortek, Tim Huntsman stated in a 1995 interview with online magazine Atari Explorer Online at E3 1995 that BattleWheels was intended to be their next follow-up project on the Jaguar, with plans to be also released on PC and now scheduled for a Q2 1995 release. However, neither version was ever completed and released to the general public for unknown reasons, though cover art and screenshots of the PC port do exist.

Despite not receiving a direct sequel, Beyond Games would later create Redline and Motor Mayhem for Windows and PlayStation 2 respectively, which are spiritual successors to the game.
