= Verdun (video game) =

2015 first-person shooter video game

- Developers: M2H; BlackMill Games
- Publishers: M2H; BlackMill Games
- Composer: Bart Delissen
- Series: WW1 Game Series
- Engine: Unity
- Platforms: Microsoft Windows; OS X; Linux; PlayStation 4; Xbox One; PlayStation 5; Xbox Series X/S
- Release: Windows, OS X, Linux; 28 April 2015; PlayStation 4; 30 August 2016; Xbox One; 8 March 2017; PlayStation 5, Xbox Series X/S; 15 June 2021
- Genre: First-person shooter
- Mode: Multiplayer

Verdun is a squad-based multiplayer first-person shooter video game set during World War I. It was released on 28 April 2015 on Steam, after more than a year in Steam Early Access. The console versions for PlayStation 4, Xbox One, PlayStation 5 and Xbox Series X/S were released between August 2016 and June 2021.

Verdun is inspired by the 1916 Battle of Verdun in France. The game includes historically accurate World War I weapons, authentic uniforms and equipment, detailed injury and gore modeling, and maps based on the real battlefields of the Western Front.

The game runs on the Unity engine and was developed by independent studios M2H and BlackMill Games.

== Gameplay ==
Verdun is a realistic, tactical squad-based game set in the trenches of World War I that can be played with up to 64 players (with 32 on each side).

Squads typically consist of 4 players, each with a unique role that is also typically made up of a squad leader called an NCO, and three roles dependent on the nation and type of squad selected. Squads can level up by helping the team, i. e. killing enemies, capturing sectors etc., gaining bonus abilities and upgrades on their preexisting abilities like accuracy, suppression etc. The NCO may rename the squad and change its type.

NCOs can call in support abilities like artillery barrages, creeping barrages, white phosphorus attacks, smoke screens and mortar shells. They can also call in more passive abilities to enhance the abilities of their squadmates, like ones helping them resist enemy suppression or enemy recon more effectively. NCOs can typically carry a self-loading pistol or revolver and melee weapons such as sabres and trench clubs. Other members of the squad typically use plenty of bolt-action rifles, plenty of bayonets and melee weapons, grenades, revolvers, semi-automatic rifles, machine guns, and SMGs depending on the type of unit and the real-life availability of those kinds of weapons to them and such.

Suppression affects player aiming and vision, by violently tilting the camera view to simulate a soldier's bobbing and weaving out of fire or reactions to almost being shot. Bombs and artillery also suppress the player, making it harder for them to aim steady while being shot at. Players can kneel and prone and also climb on the parapets of trenches to see and shoot at incoming players. Environments usually have little cover and plenty of craters made by small artillery between two sectors.

There are 4 game modes: Frontlines, Attrition Warfare, Squad Defense and Rifle Deathmatch.

=== Game modes ===
==== Frontlines ====
The players can choose to join one of the two historic sides of World War I, the Central Powers and the Triple Entente. Each side fights over a turn-based frontline map that consists of multiple trenches called sectors that can be captured by either side. Staying true to the typical attrition warfare of that time, both sides attack and counter-attack each other in turn, so the player will be forced to defend each captured sector of trenches. The goal is to capture the enemy's HQ sector or win more points than the enemy team to win the game. Points are gained by capturing a sector or by retaking a sector in a counter-attack. Players have to maintain momentum in an attack by dying as little as possible and managing to get as many people in the enemy sector as possible for as long as it is manageable.

If an attack on a sector loses too much momentum, that is, too many teammates die or do not reach the sector, the attack is called off and the enemy commences a counter-attack on their sector in return. As opposed to Tannenberg, there is not a certain number of tickets both teams have, but rather only momentum and time limits to capture a sector.

==== Squad Defense ====
Squad Defense is a cooperative game mode where players fight off endless waves of attacks by AI-controlled soldiers in one of the 12, 4-man squads. This game mode can be played on the same maps available in the Frontlines game mode. This mode is the only one that can be played offline.

==== Rifle Deathmatch ====
In Rifle Deathmatch, players fight in a free-for-all battle, armed only with one of the rifles and add-ons they can choose from when joining the game. This is a skill-based game mode, where marksmanship and tactical cunning are rewarded. Players can earn experience and Career Points by killing other players, and with the Career Points can level up their rifles, gaining extra accessories for it, such as a bayonet or scope.

== Development ==
Verdun started with early artwork in 2006. One year later, development started in the OGRE engine, but in 2008, it switched to the Unity engine and had its first version. Later that year, it was improved to a second version. In February 2013, it entered proof of concept alpha, followed by open alpha testing in April, and the game entered open beta on 9 June. It was Steam Greenlit on 28 June and entered Steam Early Access on 19 September. After more than a year in Steam Early Access, it was released on 28 April 2015 on Steam. The developers have continued working on the game, releasing free expansions.

The console versions of the game, for PlayStation 4 and Xbox One, were released in August 2016 and March 2017, respectively.

Large updates were released for the console versions of the game in December 2019. The free updates (called Verdun Remastered) added content to the console versions of the game, which had until then only been released on PC, including bot support, new squads, a new map, and various graphical updates and sound improvements. Another console update in December 2020 added cross-platform play between Xbox and PlayStation for Verdun and Tannenberg, as well as increasing the number of players in Verdun Frontlines matches from 32 to 40.

== Reception ==
Reception

Aggregate score
Aggregator	Score
Metacritic	PC: 70/100; PS4: 56/100; XONE: 46/100

Review score
Publication	Score
GameSpot	6/10

Verdun was met with "mixed or average" reception according to video game review aggregator Metacritic. GameSpot gave a score 6/10, and currently enjoys 87% recommendations by players on Steam.

== Sequels ==
Verdun was followed by Tannenberg, set in the East European theater, which was released on 13 February 2019. Another sequel, Isonzo, set in the Italian Front, was released on September 13, 2022. The game features authentic World War I elements, including weapons, uniforms, and maps inspired by real locations. Developed by BlackMill Games, Isonzo accommodates up to 48 players joining a team on PC and 40 players on consoles. The game is also playable single or multiplayer with AI bots.

A fourth game in the series, Gallipoli, set in the Middle Eastern theater, was announced in August 2025. Gallipoli was released on August 20, 2026.
