= WildWorks =

American game development studio

WildWorks, Inc.
- Logo since 2014
- Formerly: Smart Bomb Interactive, Inc.
- Type: Private
- Industry: Game developer
- Founded: 2003; 23 years ago
- Founder: Kris Johnson Clark Stacey Jeff Amis
- Headquarters: Salt Lake City, Utah, US
- Products: Animal Jam Classic; Snoopy Flying Ace
- Parent: Nazara Technologies
- Website: wildworks.com

WildWorks, Inc. (formerly Smart Bomb Interactive) is an American game development studio based in Salt Lake City, Utah. The studio was assembled from game industry veterans, co-founded by Kris Johnson, Clark Stacey, and Jeff Amis (Johnson and Stacey were previously a part of the studio Beyond Games). The studio has developed titles for all ages across many platforms, including home consoles, PCs and handheld devices.

In August 2014, the company was rebranded as WildWorks to better reflect its focus on nature-focused children's entertainment.

As of August 30, 2022, Indian based diversified gaming and sports media platform Nazara Technologies acquired WildWorks for US$10.4 million.

== History ==
Beyond Games was founded in 1992 by Kris Johnson. The first release from the company was BattleWheels for the Atari Lynx, winner of the 1993 Consumer Electronics Show Innovations Award. Their follow-up, CyberVirus was planned for release the following year, but abandoned due to sagging sales of the platform. Assets and code were sold to Songbird Productions, who completed and published the game in 2002.

== Games ==
=== Animal Jam ===
In December 2014, WildWorks released a 3D mobile app in the Animal Jam Classic universe, made with Unity, upgraded graphics and items, and new story called Animal Jam (formerly Animal Jam - Play Wild!). In 2016, it was announced that Animal Jam received over one million downloads despite having no paid user acquisition. Animal Jam has been the number one downloaded iPad game for kids 9–11 in 35 countries, the number one downloaded iPad educational game in 20 countries, and the number one top iPad game for kids 9–11 in 54 countries. As of late 2020, Animal Jam and Animal Jam Classic had 3.3 million monthly active users and a lifetime total of 130 million registered players in 200 countries.

=== Animal Jam Classic ===
The studio's flagship title was Animal Jam Classic (formerly Animal Jam). Animal Jam Classic is a virtual world for children, being developed within a partnership with the National Geographic Society. Users are placed in an online world called Jamaa, and are presented with a number of games, spaces to interact with other players, and light edutainment features in the form of games and fun facts within the game's world. The game offers additional interactive educational resources for children, teachers and parents. In early 2016, Animal Jam Classic was named the fastest growing game site in the US with over 50 million users registered worldwide.

=== Fer.al ===
On April 24, 2019, WildWorks announced Feral at UDEN #22 (stylized as "Fer.al"), a MMO game based around fantasy and myth. Unlike Animal Jam Classic and Animal Jam, Feral was going to be directed at a 13+ audience as stated at UDEN. Feral was in Closed Beta from December 11, 2019, until May 20, 2020. It went into Early Access from May 20 but never reached full release.

On February 17, 2022, wwadmin, the administrative account of WildWorks in the Feral Discord server, announced they were shutting down the game. The game was to reopen on February 19 for 24 hours, but due to violation of Feral's Terms of Service, the reopening was pushed to March 26 and shortened to 3 hours. Feral formally ceased operations on March 26 after a 3-hour shutdown period.

=== Cinder ===
Cinder was a 2021 Solana-based NFT MMO game, created using the engine and assets of the now-defunct WildWorks title Fer.al. The game is populated with avatars referred to as the Cinder Fae, whose traits are procedurally generated for sale as NFT character tokens. At launch, the initial mint contained 4,444 Cinder Fae NFTs for sale on the Solana marketplace. According to the Cinder white paper, the WildWorks team began beta testing in April 2020. At some point, the part of WildWorks creating Cinder branched off and formed Cinder Studios.

On February 8, 2023, Cinder's servers suddenly shut down without warning, along with its website. An employee reported that Cinder Studios was shut down. There have been no official announcements about Cinder's shutdown.

=== List of Titles ===
==== As Beyond Games ====
| Game | Details |
|---|---|
| BattleWheels Original release date: June 1993 | Release years by system: 1993 – Atari Lynx |
| BattleWheels Original release date: June 1993 | Notes: Vehicular combat game; Published by Beyond Games |
| Ultra Vortek Original release date: September 13, 1995 | Release years by system: 1995 – Atari Jaguar |
| Ultra Vortek Original release date: September 13, 1995 | Notes: Fighting game; Published by Atari Corporation |
| Redline Original release date: March 24, 1999 | Release years by system: 1999 – Windows |
| Redline Original release date: March 24, 1999 | Notes: First-person shooter; Published by Accolade |
| Motor Mayhem Original release date: July 2, 2001 | Release years by system: 2001 – PlayStation 2 |
| Motor Mayhem Original release date: July 2, 2001 | Notes: Vehicular combat game; Published by Infogrames |
| Hot Wheels Velocity X Original release date: October 18, 2002 | Release years by system: 2002 – GameCube, Windows, PlayStation 2 |
| Hot Wheels Velocity X Original release date: October 18, 2002 | Notes: Racing video game; Published by THQ |

==== As Smart Bomb Interactive ====
- Snoopy vs. the Red Baron
- Snoopy Flying Ace
- Tunnel Town
- Animal Jam Jump
- Pac-Man World Rally
- Bee Movie Game
- Dash Tag
- Tag with Ryan

== Technology ==
The studio also developed Bombshell, an engine and toolset for the development of high-fidelity interactive entertainment. The studio previously received first-round funding from the Canopy Group.
