= Tannenberg (video game) =

2019 first-person shooter video game

- Developers: M2H; BlackMill Games
- Publishers: M2H; BlackMill Games
- Composer: Bart Delissen
- Series: WW1 Game Series
- Engine: Unity
- Platforms: Microsoft Windows; OS X; Linux; PlayStation 4; Xbox One
- Release: Microsoft Windows, OS X, Linux: WW: February 13, 2019; PlayStation 4, Xbox One: WW: July 24, 2020
- Genre: First-person shooter

Tannenberg is a squad-based multiplayer first-person shooter video game set during World War I. It is a sequel to Verdun, and entered Steam Early Access in November 2017, followed by its full release on February 13, 2019. It was released on PlayStation 4 and Xbox One on July 24, 2020.

Tannenberg is inspired by the 1914 Battle of Tannenberg in East Prussia. The game includes historically accurate World War I weapons, authentic uniforms and equipment, detailed injury and gore modeling, and maps based on the real battlefields of the Eastern Front.

The game runs on the Unity engine and was developed by independent studios M2H and BlackMill Games.

== Gameplay ==
Tannenberg is a squad based game set on the Eastern Front of World War I that can be played with up to 64 players (40 players on consoles). There are 3 game modes in Tannenberg: Maneuver, Attrition Warfare and Rifle Deathmatch. In April 2019 a temporary 'Wolf Truce' feature was added to the Maneuver game mode, based on historical reports of armies calling truces to fight wolves. During this event, packs of wolves would sometimes enter the battlefield and attack players. Players would then be able to conduct a truce while wolves were present, or they could break the truce and continue fighting normally. Additionally, a 'Film Memoir' visual mode was added which switches the game's art and user interface to black and white, while adding a film grain effect. Another console update in December 2020 added cross-platform play between Xbox and PlayStation for Verdun and Tannenberg. The game is said to be evidently accurate to the real war to quite an extent.

=== Game modes ===
==== Maneuver ====
In the Maneuver game mode, players join either the Entente or the Central Powers. After choosing a squad type and role within the squad, players join the battle where they have to capture sectors. Holding sectors provides control points (more or less depending on the value of the sector) and the team with the most control points will drain the other side's resources. The game ends when one team runs out of resources, when either team's HQ sector is captured, or when the match time runs out. Some sectors provide accelerated reloading abilities for NCOs, such as calling reconnaissance aircraft and artillery strikes. Supply lines are represented by requiring sectors to be connected to a team's HQ sector before that team can capture it.

==== Attrition Warfare ====
Attrition Warfare is a variant of a team deathmatch battle. Each team, the Entente and the Central Powers, start with a number of tickets. These represent the amount of manpower that each side has at its disposal. Every time a player is killed and respawns, a ticket is deducted from the side he belongs to. The goal of the game is to diminish the opposing side's tickets before losing all the tickets on player's side, because a player cannot respawn if there are no more tickets.

==== Rifle Deathmatch ====
In Rifle Deathmatch, players fight in a free for all battle, armed only with one of the rifles and add-ons they can choose from when joining the game. This is a skill-based game-mode, where marksmanship and tactical cunning are rewarded. Players can earn experience and Career Points by killing other players, and with the Career Points can level up their rifles, gaining extra accessories for it, such as a bayonet.

== Audio ==
Niels van der Leest was the audio director for Tannenberg.

== Reception ==
Reception

Aggregate score
Aggregator	Score
Metacritic	(PC) 69/100 (PS4) 61/100 (XONE) 72/100

Review score
Publication	Score
Destructoid	6/10

The Rock, Paper, Shotgun website gave a positive opinion to the early access version, saying that the game serves as a contrast to the "bombastic" and "spectacular" war games, with quiet, everyday tragedies. The reviewer described Tannenberg as an improvement compared to Verdun, but also less unique.

== Sequel ==
A sequel to Tannenberg, Isonzo, takes players to the Italian Front during WWI. Released on September 13, 2022, Isonzo offers a team-based multiplayer experience with historically accurate weapons, uniforms, and maps based on the Southern Front's real battlefields. Developed by BlackMill Games, Isonzo allows for up to 48 players per team on PC and 40 on consoles. AI bot support is also included.

A fourth game in the WW1 game series, Gallipoli, was announced in August 2025.
