= Animal Jam Classic =

Online educational game

- Animal Jam Classic logo since 2020
- Developer: WildWorks
- Publisher: WildWorks
- Engine: Adobe Flash
- Platforms: Windows, macOS, formerly Flash Player
- Release: September 9, 2010
- Genres: MMO, Education
- Mode: Multiplayer

Animal Jam Classic, formerly known as Animal Jam, is a massively multiplayer online game developed by WildWorks and recommended for children up to the age of 12. It was launched in 2010 in collaboration with the National Geographic Society. As of late 2020, there were 3.3 million monthly active users and a lifetime total of 130 million registered players in 200 countries across both Animal Jam Classic and the mobile app spin-off Animal Jam.

In Animal Jam Classic, players can discover various facts about zoology using the game's numerous features, including mini-games, puzzles, adventures, parties, and social interactions. Due to its rapid growth, Animal Jam Classic has expanded its merchandise offerings to include figurines, books, board games, and a subscription box.

Although Animal Jam Classic is primarily played on PC, the Animal Jam Classic universe has been expanded to incorporate most mobile devices such as smartphones, tablets, and iOS devices. The most popular Animal Jam Classic mobile app spin-off is Animal Jam, previously known as Animal Jam - Play Wild!, which is a 3D version of the Animal Jam Classic world. WildWorks has also developed other mobile apps based on the Animal Jam Classic game, including Tunnel Town, AJ Jump, and Dash Tag.

In May 2020, in an event dubbed the "aMAYzing Migration", WildWorks rebranded the desktop game from Animal Jam to Animal Jam Classic; as part of the event, the app that was formerly known as Animal Jam – Play Wild! was rebranded to Animal Jam.

== Development ==
Animal Jam Classic was developed by WildWorks (formerly Smart Bomb Interactive) and was launched on September 9, 2010. In 2011, Animal Jam Classic had accumulated over 1 million registered players. Later, in March 2013, the game had grown to over 10 million players, a milestone which was made known to all of the players in the game itself. Since then, Animal Jam Classic's player count had grown rapidly with the game having over 100 million players as of late 2018. As of 2021, Animal Jam Classic is not available to play without the desktop app, due to the discontinuation of Adobe Flash Player.

== Gameplay environment ==
Jammers in Jamaa Township, the central hub of the game.

Animal Jam Classic takes place in an area known as Jamaa, with various different biomes and customizable animals. New players can create an animal with a name that is composed of three simple words. From that point, players can customize and move it around in the gameplay environment. The original 6 virtual animals that could be utilized were the Bunny, Monkey, Wolf, Tiger, Panda, and Koala, though many more animals have since been added.

Players can customize their own dens (virtual houses) with furniture, chat with other players, adopt pets, play mini-games, purchase in-game clothing and furniture with in-game currency, trade items, attend parties, and go on various RPG-style adventures. There is an optional paid subscription-like membership feature available that allows players to access certain exclusive in-game features.

=== Communication and safety ===
Animal Jam Classic contains three versions of in-game chat, which offers various levels of restriction. Bubble Chat restricts players from typing messages but will allow them to select predefined words and phrases in a list. Safe Chat, the default setting, allows players to type words or phrases in a particular list which only the game permits, similar to a whitelist. Safe Chat Plus, which was previously available only to members but is now available for all players, allows players to type any word or phrase while being run through the game's safe chat filter. Parents can control players' chat settings from the site's parent dashboard. Players can report or block another player for unacceptable, intolerable, or inappropriate behavior. If a player is found chatting in an inappropriate way, the player may have their chat temporarily muted or even be suspended from logging on for a long period.

Animal Jam Classic is free from outside advertising and adheres to a strict privacy policy. In October 2020, a data breach occurred where over 46 million player records were released and uploaded onto raidforums.com. To remedy this, WildWorks forced all players to immediately change their passwords.

=== Educational elements ===
In addition to in-game nature facts and activities, Animal Jam Classic provides educational video content featuring herpetologist Brady Barr and marine biologist Tierney Thys. Furthermore, there are certain events and activities that help raise awareness for environmental problems.

== Membership ==
While Animal Jam Classic operates on a free-to-play model, it also includes a paid membership system that grants players access to member-exclusive game features. Membership tiers vary based on duration and include one-month, six-month, and twelve-month options. While all membership tiers offer the same core benefits, they differ in the amount of bonus in-game currency granted to users upon purchase. Animal Jam Classic membership also grants players access to member-only features in the mobile spin-off Animal Jam.

Membership benefits include access to exclusive in-game features such as member-only animals and items, custom name tags, and daily in-game currency bonuses. Memberships can be purchased directly through the Animal Jam website or redeemed via physical gift cards sold through authorized retailers.

Membership subscriptions are a primary source of the game's revenue. Since its launch in September 2010, Animal Jam generated approximately $150 million in lifetime revenue by 2018, with roughly 85% of that total coming from membership purchases.

== Other media ==
=== Merchandise ===
Animal Jam Classic shirts, stuffed animals, hats, in-game currency, books, and toys were previously sold on the Animal Jam Outfitters site. As of 2025, the Animal Jam Outfitters site is now the Animal Jam Shop and only sells digital gift certificates and memberships for Animal Jam Classic and Animal Jam.

In 2013, WildWorks partnered with Sidekix to produce a set of eight stuffed animals modeled after the Animal Jam Classic avatars that can be "flipped" into a ball. In October 2015, the company named Jazwares as the main toy partner for the Animal Jam Classic brand. Jazwares began developing figures, playsets, and plush items which were launched internationally in 2016. In June 2016, WildWorks released Animal Jam Classic toys which consisted mainly of stuffed animals, figures, and toy sets. One of which is a series of toys called "Animal Jam Adopt-a-Pet" which comes with a miniature figure of a pet from the game and two accessories in a den shaped box, along with an in-game item code. Since the release, four series of toys have been released so far, featuring different pets, accessories, and dens. On November 16, 2016, WildWorks launched the "Animal Jam Box", a subscription box that contained merchandise sent to those who subscribed to the plan. The subscription box was discontinued in Spring 2020. In early 2019, WildWorks' contract with Jazwares ended, and thus the company could no longer make merchandise with Jazwares. Pillow Pets based on Animal Jam Classic in-game avatars were previously sold on the Pillow Pets official website, and on various online stores including Amazon.

In April 2025, WildWorks announced that they would be working with the crowdfunding platform Makeship to produce a plush of the Pet Sugar Glider from Animal Jam. After the petition succeeded its goal of 200 supporters preorders went live in July. The product's limited run ended in August of the same year. A code for both Animal Jam and Animal Jam Classic was sent to backers via email which gave them an in-game den item of the Pet Sugar Glider Plush. They plan to produce more plushies with Makeship in the future.

=== Animal Jam Academy ===
Animal Jam Academy is a program that is directly linked to the Animal Jam Classic website. It provides users with "how-to" projects using the themes of science, technology, engineering, and art.

=== Mobile apps ===
==== Animal Jam ====
The most popular mobile application by WildWorks is Animal Jam, formerly known as Animal Jam - Play Wild!, which is a 3D version of the Animal Jam Classic game and was released in August 2015.

In February 2016, WildWorks had announced that Animal Jam had reached over 1 million downloads. The app is the top downloaded iPad educational game in 24 countries, the top downloaded game for 11 in 35 countries in 2018, and top-grossing iPad game in 54 countries. On May 19, 2017, Animal Jam won the Google Play Awards 2017 for Best Kids' App.

In early 2020, a version of Animal Jam was released for personal computers, allowing players to play on Windows and macOS without a browser.

==== Other apps ====
On July 18, 2013, a free Animal Jam Classic-based city-building mobile game called Tunnel Town was released on the iOS and Android. In Tunnel Town, players raise a bunny family underground by purchasing, looking after, and raising new rabbit species.

Later, in 2013, a second Animal Jam Classic mobile game spin-off was available for purchase, titled AJ Jump. The game is centered on kangaroos, with a similar gameplay format to Doodle Jump.

In 2018, a third game was released, titled Dash Tag. In Dash Tag, the player collects various animals and attempts to evade capture from a character named Misha the Panda. The gameplay is an endless runner game, similar to Subway Surfers and Temple Run. WildWorks replicated the game under the title Tag with Ryan in collaboration with the Ryan's World YouTube channel.

=== Roblox ===
In December 2025, a version of Animal Jam on Roblox was released into beta. Though not developed by WildWorks, the company authorized the game's creation and oversaw its creative development. The game is a separate from Animal Jam and Animal Jam Classic and save data does not carry over.

== Community and culture ==
Animal Jam Classic has developed a notably active player community since its 2010 release, reaching a lifetime total of 130 million registered players across 200 countries as of September 2020. Players, referred to as "Jammers," frequently gather in popular in-game locations to communicate with one another, play mini-games, and trade items. From its release through 2020, users logged over one billion hours of gameplay, the chat system facilitated over 43.4 billion messages, and the in-game item trading system recorded 932.5 million trades.

A key aspect of the game's culture is its trading system, in which players exchange in-game items based on perceived rarity and demand. Over time, player-driven value systems have emerged within the community, with certain items being considered more desirable due to limited availability, past event exclusivity, or accidental distribution through developer glitches.

Animal Jam Classic has also contributed to a broader online fan community; players create content such as gameplay walkthroughs, trading guides, and music videos on external platforms such as YouTube and Instagram. The game's fan community eventually led to the creation of the official application-based "Jambassador" program, in which players who create related content such as videos and artwork may apply to be selected by the developers to represent the brand. Selected ambassadors are provided with professional resources, early access to new features, and opportunities to collaborate with the game's official social media channels.

== Reception ==
Animal Jam Classic has received relatively positive reviews, with some criticism towards perceived inadequate moderation and strict limitations on accounts with the free plan. Common Sense Media reviewer Dana Anderson gave Animal Jam Classic a 3-star rating, saying that the site was most appropriate for ages ten and over due to "unmonitored chat." Gamezebo reviewer Nick Tylwalk gave the site a 4-star review, which stated, "There's something for animal lovers over a load range of ages."

Jenna Glatzer on The Washington Post reported problematic social interactions on the game, including cyberbullying, scams for virtual items, and cybersex. Natalie Shahmiri, WildWorks' Vice President of Marketing, provided a statement in the article on how the staff are aware of these problems and working to close moderation loopholes that allow such interactions to happen.

== Awards ==
Award	Recipient	Result
Mr. Dad	Animal Jam Classic (formerly Animal Jam)	Won
National Parenting Publications Awards	Animal Jam Classic	Won
Life Buzz Award	Animal Jam Classic	Won
About.com Readers' Choice Awards	Animal Jam Classic	Won
Webby Awards, Games Category	Animal Jam Classic	Nominated
2016 Parents' Choice Awards	Animal Jam Classic	Won
2017 Google Play Awards, Best Kids App Category	Animal Jam (formerly Animal Jam - Play Wild!)	Won
