= Snoopy vs. the Red Baron (video game) =

2006 PlayStation and PC video game

- Cover art showing Snoopy flying the Sopwith Camel with Woodstock while the Red Baron is chasing them.
- Developer: Smart Bomb Interactive
- Publisher: Namco Bandai Games America
- Series: Peanuts
- Platforms: PlayStation Portable; PlayStation 2 Microsoft Windows
- Release: NA: October 24, 2006; Windows: NA: November 3, 2006
- Genre: Flight simulator
- Modes: Single-player, multiplayer

Snoopy vs. the Red Baron is a flight combat game released on the PlayStation 2, PlayStation Portable, and PC in 2006. A version for Xbox was announced but cancelled. As the name implies, the protagonist is Snoopy, the dog in Charles M. Schulz's comic strip, Peanuts. The game is based on Snoopy's alter ego as a World War I flying ace, battling against the Red Baron and his Flying Circus.

This is the first Peanuts game released on a Sony platform and the second overall Peanuts game based on Snoopy's ace pilot fantasies, after Snoopy and the Red Baron. It was followed in 2010 by Snoopy Flying Ace.

== Gameplay ==
The game has 22 missions to complete, with upgradeable World War I-era planes, including Snoopy's Sopwith Camel, to control. Unlike the original comic, many Peanuts characters appear in the game as officers and pilots for the Allied Army. The main characters include Charlie Brown, Lucy, Linus, Sally, Peppermint Patty, Marcie and more. There are also several enemies for Snoopy to shoot down, including the Baron himself.

== Plot ==
Snoopy vs. the Red Baron begins with Lucy and Charlie Brown wondering what Snoopy does in his spare time, a World War I flying ace being one of them. Linus meanwhile, has just finished reading Snoopy's manuscript about his flying ace daydreams when Charlie himself comes up to read it.

In Snoopy’s manuscript, a fictional story set in 1916 Europe during World War I, Charlie Brown is the janitor for the Allies, Lucy is the general, Linus is the intelligence officer and Marcie is the head scientist. The Red Baron and his Flying Circus begin an attack on Civilization Island (or Aerodrome Island). The Allies are able to successfully destroy both the Baron's base and a battleship that attacks the Allied aerodrome.

Back at the aerodrome, Charlie Brown is perusing plans for a "Doodlebug bomb," a weapon of mass destruction that could change the outcome of the war when he is kidnapped by a Flying Circus spy. Conrad, one of Woodstock's relatives, explains the situation to Lucy who then has Sally compile a report on the woods of Montsec, where the Flying Circus has built up a base. Snoopy destroys the base and then destroys a massive Harvester vehicle that the Baron sends to build a new base.

As Snoopy battles the enemy in Verdun, Conrad manages to sneak into Charlie Brown's cell behind enemy lines and Charlie Brown writes a secret message demanding his rescue as well as information that the Flying Circus are beginning work on the Doodlebug bomb. To complete the bomb, the Flying Circus needs unobtanium, so they have set up a mine in the Alps. When Lucy is informed of this, she dispatches Snoopy to the mines of the Matterhorn where he defeats several fighter planes, a military train, and a drilling machine.

As the Allied Forces move into Verdon Gorge, Lucy, Rerun and Franklin are captured, leaving Linus in command. Sending Snoopy to the gorge, the beagle sinks an aircraft carrier. With his plans foiled, the Baron sends out a giant flying fortress with the Doodlebug onboard. Snoopy takes off after it. He first disables the engines, then frees the captive Allied pilots. Angered, the Red Baron faces Snoopy himself. Snoopy shoots the Baron down, but the Baron launches a complete Doodlebug bomb (with Charlie Brown strapped atop it) towards Allied Headquarters. Snoopy manages to free Charlie Brown and intercept the Doodlebug before it can strike its target.

After defeating the Baron and the destroying the Doodlebug, Snoopy heads back to the aerodrome to celebrate. He awakens from his dream when he hears Charlie Brown calling for him. Snoopy salutes him, leading Charlie Brown to utter "Why can't I have a normal dog like everyone else?"

== Reception ==
Reception

Aggregate score
Aggregator	Score		
Aggregator	PC	PS2	PSP
Metacritic	68/100	73/100	76/100

Review scores
Publication	Score		
Publication	PC	PS2	PSP
GameSpot	7.3/10	7.3/10	7.3/10
GameSpy	N/A	3.5/5	3.5/5
GamesRadar+	N/A	3.5/5	N/A
GameZone	N/A	7.7/10	N/A
IGN	N/A	7/10	7/10
Official U.S. PlayStation Magazine	N/A	7.5/10	7.5/10
PC Gamer (US)	72%	N/A	N/A
PlayStation: The Official Magazine	N/A	7.5/10	7.5/10
X-Play	N/A	4/5	N/A

The PSP version received "generally favorable reviews", while the PlayStation 2 and PC versions received "average" reviews according to video game review aggregator Metacritic.
