= Snoopy Flying Ace =

2010 video game

- Developer: Smart Bomb Interactive
- Publisher: Microsoft Game Studios
- Platform: Xbox 360
- Release: June 2, 2010
- Genres: Action, arcade flight
- Modes: Single-player, multiplayer

Snoopy Flying Ace is a dogfighting video game based on Charles M. Schulz's Peanuts franchise and developed by Smart Bomb Interactive for the Xbox Live Arcade service on the Xbox 360. It was announced on November 10, 2008 and released on June 2, 2010. An unofficial sequel to the 2006 video game Snoopy vs. the Red Baron, it features a similar World War I setting. Snoopy is tasked with defeating several members of the Flying Circus, a special flight squadron in the Luftstreitkräfte, and its commander, Manfred von Richthofen, also known as the Red Baron.

The game was well-received by critics, where it drew comparisons to Crimson Skies. Critics praised the amount of content and polish in the game and stated it was well worth its price. As of year-end 2011, the game has sold over 122,000 copies.

== Gameplay ==
Snoopy Flying Ace features online play over Xbox Live for up to 16 players.

The gameplay is similar to that of another arcade-style flight combat series Crimson Skies. The primary gameplay revolves around dogfights using biplanes and triplanes. Players can also fly into stationary turrets and control them. Two-player cooperative is supported via splitscreen, and two players can play through the entire campaign together. Acrobatic maneuvers such as barrel rolls and immelmanns can also be performed.

Players can select and customize one of several Peanuts characters, who have several outfits to choose from, or select and play as their Xbox Live avatar. Planes can also be customized, from visuals to weaponry. Each plane is equipped with machine guns, and other weapons such as missiles, an EMP blast, and floating mines can be equipped. Weaponry can also be changed during gameplay after players respawn.

The game supports up to 16 players over Xbox Live, and features eight online game modes. Pigskin is an airborne rugby involving passing a ball among planes to reach the opposite goal without being shot down. The traditional Deathmatch and Team Deathmatch modes also appear, known in-game as Dogfight and Team Dogfight. Capture the flag is also available. Players can earn bonuses by gaining kill streaks in multiplayer; one example is that Woodstock will appear on the back of the plane and attack enemies from the rear after four kills in a row.

== Plot ==
Snoopy Flying Ace is a fictional story set in 1917 Europe and northern Africa during World War I. Snoopy, a famous Allied fighter pilot, must combat the Imperial German Army Air Service. His primary target is a specialized group of pilots dubbed the Flying Circus, and its commander, Manfred von Richthofen, otherwise known as the Red Baron. The game features several characters from the Peanuts franchise, some belonging to the Royal Flying Corps in the British Army of the Allied faction, others to the Luftstreitkräfte in the Deutsches Heer of the Central Powers faction. During multiplayer matches players can choose any character, regardless of faction alignment during the campaign. The player's Xbox 360 avatar can also be used during gameplay, and is aligned to the faction of the player's choice.

== Development and marketing ==
Snoopy Flying Ace was announced on November 10, 2008. Smart Bomb Interactive began development for the title with no publisher and no set platforms. It was later announced at Tokyo Game Show on September 24, 2009 that Microsoft Studios would be publishing the game for Xbox Live Arcade on the Xbox 360. It was shown in March 2010 at the Penny Arcade Expo where more features of the game were revealed. It was released on June 2, 2010. In promotion of the game, several Snoopy Flying Ace-themed avatar items were released on the Xbox Live Marketplace on June 8, 2010. A downloadable content pack dubbed Suppertime of Destruction was released on August 25, 2010. It features two additional planes, five additional multiplayer modes, three new weapons, and several new character costumes and plane skins.

Smart Bomb Interactive stated that the inspiration for Flying Ace came from their well-received 2006 title, Snoopy vs. the Red Baron. "We were very proud of that game and it was a critical success, but the budget and time constraints that came from the publisher [Namco] left us feeling that we could have done a lot more. So we went to United Media and representatives of the Schulz family, and we licensed the property ourselves" stated Clark Stacey, Vice President for Smart Bomb Interactive. "But of course, it was Charles M. Schulz’s original strips of Snoopy as the World Famous WWI Flying Ace that are the ultimate inspiration" added Stacey. The game was developed using Bombshell, Smart Bomb Interactive's game engine and toolset.

== Reception ==
Snoopy Flying Ace

Aggregate score
Aggregator	Score
Metacritic	80/100

Review scores
Publication	Score
1Up.com	B+
Eurogamer	6/10
Game Informer	8.5/10
GameRevolution	A−
GameSpot	8/10
GameZone	8/10
IGN	9/10
Official Xbox Magazine (UK)	7/10
Official Xbox Magazine (US)	7.5/10
The Escapist	4/5

Snoopy Flying Ace received "favorable" reviews according to video game review aggregator Metacritic. It also received an Editor's Choice award from IGN's Arthur Gies, who called it "both the best dogfighting game of this console generation and one of the most exciting multiplayer titles to come out this year." As of August 2010, Snoopy Flying Ace has sold over 84,000 copies and as of year-end 2010, the game has sold over 110,000 copies. 2011 sales exceeded 122,000 units. Several reviewers stated that the game's price was a great value.

Critics gave universally positive remarks in regards to gameplay. Eduardo Reboucas of Game Revolution said the game was "extremely easy to pick up", and added "Weapons are also varied and offer plenty of combinations for a lot of different tactics." Eurogamer's Kristan Reed echoed his remarks and stated that "simplified objectives and stripped-down controls to make it instantly accessible to everyone." Joe Donato of GameZone praised the dogfights and added "combat is a thrill." 1UP.com's Chris Pereira also agreed and stated "it's a more accessible, trimmed-down version of Crimson Skies at a bargain price." He was critical of the single player AI, however, and added "enemies evade your attacks so frequently that it feels like the game is just trying to artificially lengthen each encounter." Reviewers also universally praised the online gameplay. Official Xbox Magazine (UK)'s reviewer stated Snoopy Flying Ace "plays incredibly well on Xbox Live." Brett Todd of GameSpot called the online play "intense" and "frenzied." Like 1UP.com's Chris Pereira, however, Todd criticized the AI, stating that dogfights can occasionally become shallow. Todd also felt the game could have used even more focus on Peanuts characters. The Escapist's John Funk called it "a whimsical, imaginative take on World War I that has you fighting for freedom and for fun. The missions get repetitive, and there are only three types of planes with different skins, but the combat itself is entertaining, the weapons are cool, the multiplayer is a ton of fun – and it's jam-packed with lovable charm."

The game's graphics also received generally high marks. Game Informer's Annette Gonzalez praised the environment and characters and stated "Charles M. Schulz’ characters are impressively realized in the video game space." The reviewer from Official Xbox Magazine (UK) called it a "great looking shooter." Game Revolution's Eduardo Reboucas agreed, and added the game had "undeniable charm everywhere."
