= Gallipoli (video game) =

2026 video game

- Developer: BlackMill Games
- Publisher: BlackMill Games
- Composer: Bart Delissen
- Series: WW1
- Engine: Unity
- Platforms: PlayStation 5; Windows; Xbox Series X/S
- Release: 20 August 2026
- Genre: First-person shooter
- Mode: Multiplayer

Gallipoli is a first-person shooter video game set on the Ottoman Fronts of World War I. The game was released on 20 August 2026, for PlayStation 5, Windows and Xbox Series X/S. It is the fourth entry in the WW1 Game Series following up Isonzo, Tannenberg and Verdun.

Gallipoli is named after the 1915 Battle of Gallipoli. The game includes historically accurate World War I weapons, authentic uniforms and equipment, detailed injury and gore modeling, and maps based on the real battlefields of the Ottoman Fronts. Players will either play on the side of the British Empire (Australia, Britain and India) or the Ottoman Empire.

The game runs on Unity 6 and was developed by Dutch independent studio BlackMill Games. IGN first announced the game through their website on August 18, 2025.

== Gameplay ==
Gallipoli is a tactical squad-based multiplayer game with PVP combat. Players can choose from a variety of classes. The officer leads their team, while the Light Machine Gunner fires on the enemy and the Stretcher Bearer tries to keep their squad in the fight. Each class can choose from a different selection of weapons and equipment. The game uses a system where there are five squads on each side, each consisting of five players (or bots). Each squad can fulfil a different combat role; the Assault squad are the vanguard of any assault, the Support squad support their team through medical treatment and ammunition supply, and so forth.

The game boasts many overhauls of gameplay mechanics compared to previous titles. Suppression has been significantly overhauled. Minor suppression will affect the player's weapon sway and recoil control. Severe suppression will cause the player to sometimes bungle reloads or forget to close the bolt (of a bolt-action rifle) under the stress of battle. Weapons and equipment do not need to be manually unlocked, as in previous titles. However, spending time with a weapon will increase the player's effectiveness with said weapon, manifested in the form of "perks". A similar system affects class progression. Stamina has been made more dynamic; all energy-intensive actions such as vaulting, sprinting and melee combat consume stamina. Running in particular no longer happens at a constant speed. The player character will now start out especially fast, but begin to flag and slow down as stamina depletes. The player can sprint even when out of stamina, but it is slower than ordinary sprinting. Further, running with a pistol is now significantly faster than running while carrying a light machine gun.

A major addition to the health system is the "downed" state. If the player is shot in a non-vital part of the body, they will fall down but not die instantaneously. Their teammates then have to revive them before they exsanguinate. The downed player can stay still and attempt to slow the bleeding from the wound, or crawl back to a position where their allies can revive them, but at the expense of further bleeding and the risk of attracting attention from enemy players and being finished off.

Gallipoli's signature game mode can be played with up to 50 players and is about momentum. The aim of the attacking side is to complete their objectives as quickly as possible. The defending team has to hold their objective as long as possible to waste the enemy's momentum. Attackers can preserve their momentum by reviving their downed teammates, and gain small amounts by destroying enemy supply caches and other structures, termed "Beacons." The structure of the map is divided into "sectors" each having a primary "headquarters" and support objective. Support objectives cannot be permanently held, but may be used as a springboard to an assault on the headquarters. Once the attacking team has driven the opponents back, they then have to secure the objective via a variety of means. If the attackers' momentum runs out while contesting the objective, the game enters a phase called "Foothold" where attackers have effectively infinite momentum so long as they keep contesting the objective, until it is secured (in which case the game proceeds to the next sector) or they are driven off the objective (in which case the game is won by the defending team.)

== Locations ==
The battles and locations used for maps in the game are:

- Suez - Raid on the Suez Canal, 26 January – 4 February 1915
- ANZAC Cove - Landing at Anzac Cove, 25 April 1915
- V Beach - Landing at Cape Helles, 25–26 April 1915
- Ctesiphon - Battle of Ctesiphon, 22–25 November 1915
- Kut Al-Amara - Siege of Kut, 7 December 1915 – 29 April 1916
- Ali Al-Muntar - Second Battle of Gaza, 17-19 April 1917

== Reception ==
Reception

Aggregate scores
Aggregator	Score
Metacritic	(PC) 83/100
OpenCritic	89% recommend (Note: Based on 8 reviews)

Review score
Publication	Score
IGN	9/10

The PC version of Gallipoli received generally favorable reviews from critics, according to the review aggregation website Metacritic. Fellow review aggregator OpenCritic assessed that the game received "mighty" approval, being recommended by 89% of critics.
