= The Snowfield =

2011 experimental video game

- Developer: Singapore-MIT Gambit Game Lab
- Publisher: Singapore-MIT Gambit Game Lab
- Producer: Andre Ng Yu Choon
- Programmers: Chong Zi Yi, Naomi Hinchen
- Artists: Nor Azman Rohman, Young Jin Chung, Frendy Wijaya
- Engine: Unity
- Platforms: Windows, Mac
- Release: 2011
- Genres: Action, Experimental narrative
- Mode: Single-player

The Snowfield is a 2011 action and experimental narrative video game, developed as a student project by the Singapore-MIT Gambit Game Lab, and set in World War I. The game is set on the aftermath of a great battle, with the player controlling a weakened soldier in the middle of a storm.

According to the developers, the game's development was an attempt to make a simulation-based narrative game without the need for massive, complex AI and massive content generation. Instead, the developers created several segments of gameplay — characters, objects etc. — and fine-tuned them based on how initial testers interacted with them.

== Reception ==
Adam Smith, writing for Rock, Paper, Shotgun, praised the game's narrative and design uniqueness, as well as its well-worked aesthetics. The game was a finalist at the 17th Annual Independent Games Festival, hosted in 2012, in the Student category.
