= Clark Stacey =

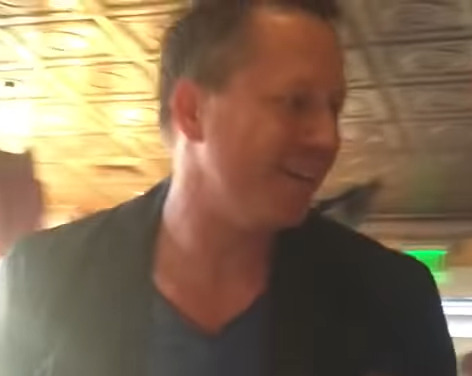
- Clark Stacey at Animal Jam Vidcon 2016
- Born: February 24, 1980 (age 46)
- Years active: 1980–present
- Known for: Former CEO of WildWorks
- Notable work: Animal Jam, Tunnel Town, Fer.al,
- Website: https://clarkstacey.com/

Clark Stacey (born 1980) is an American video game developer. He is the co-founder and former chief executive officer of WildWorks (earlier known as Smart Bomb Interactive), which in 2010 launched the National Geographic Animal Jam, a massively multiplayer online virtual world, in partnership with the National Geographic Society. The game has around 75 million registered players, and is one of the fastest-growing online children's properties worldwide, targeted at the 9–11 years age group.

== Early life and education ==
Stacey was born and raised in Ogden, Utah. He graduated from the University of Utah with a degree in English literature and philosophy.

== Career ==
In 2003, in consequence of his long-standing interest in the field, Stacey teamed up with Kris Johnson again and co-founded Smart Bomb Interactive, which specialized as a game development studio and earned revenues through a licensing model. During these years, video games exemplifying explosions and destruction became the leitmotifs of Stacey's video game productions.

Stacey and Johnson subsequently rechristened the company as WildWorks. Based out of Salt Lake City and employing around 130 video game developers as of 2016, Stacey and Johnson went on to develop highly followed games like Animal Jam Classic, Snoopy Flying Ace, Tunnel Town, Fer.al, and others. In August 2022, WildWorks was acquired by Nazara Technologies.

Around January 2024, Stacey stepped down from the CEO position at WildWorks, and then stepped down from his board member position around July 2024.

Following Stacey's leave from WildWorks in July 2024 he became the CEO of ANIMACCORD DTC in charge of a Masha and the Bear interactive universe dubbed MASHAVERSE.

== See also ==
- Snoopy Flying Ace
- Animal Jam Classic
