= Jutland (video game) =

- Developer(s): Norm Koger, Jim Rose
- Publisher(s): Storm Eagle Studios
- Platform(s): Microsoft Windows
- Release: 2009
- Genre(s): Ship simulation, strategy
- Mode(s): Single-player, multiplayer

Jutland is a World War I naval strategy videogame, which simulates individual ship and fleet level combat. It was created by American developers Norm Koger and Jim Rose and published by Storm Eagle Studios.
On engine this game was released in 2009 year Distant Guns 1.5 - remake/remaster 2006 year game Distant Guns: Russo-Japanese War at Sea.

== Gameplay ==
Players can choose to play as the Royal Navy or Imperial German Navy and can fight individual naval battles (historical and hypothetical) or full campaigns.

== See also ==
- Naval warfare
- Great Naval Battles
