= Snoopy and the Red Baron (video game) =

1983 video game

- Developer: Atari, Inc.
- Publishers: Atari, Inc.
- Programmers: Nick Turner; Richard Dobbis
- Artist: Sam Comstock
- Series: Peanuts
- Platform: Atari 2600
- Release: November 1983
- Genre: Shoot 'em up
- Mode: Single-player

Snoopy and the Red Baron is an Atari 2600 shoot 'em up featuring Peanuts character Snoopy and his aviation rival, the Red Baron. It is the first video game based on Peanuts by Charles M. Schulz and was published by Atari, Inc. in 1983.

== Gameplay ==
Snoopy and the Red Baron on the Atari 2600

Snoopy and the Red Baron is a single-player game with the player guiding Snoopy on his doghouse with four variations of difficulty to play. The objective is to shoot down Snoopy's rival, the Red Baron, controls being the stick to maneuver Snoopy and the button to fire. The game starts out with the player having four doghouses, otherwise known as lives. It takes eight hits to destroy the Red Baron, and eight hits from the Red Baron to have the player lose a doghouse.

An alternative notion is to collect "treats" the Red Baron drops while falling, and to avoid skulls and crossbones. Touching the skulls and crossbones or being shot down will undo the player's progress in collecting treats. If the player collects all of the treats and downs all of the Red Barons, bonus points are rewarded. A Gold Baron is earned when the player downs fifty Red Barons.

In the game, the Red Baron often flies above the clouds; however, Snoopy cannot fly above the clouds in the play set. An exclamation mark appears whenever one million points are scored.

== Release ==
Snoopy and the Red Baron was released in 1983. This game was play-tested alongside the Atari 2600 game Bugs Bunny. Snoopy and the Red Baron was favored better by play-testers, allowing the game to enter the market, while the Bugs Bunny game was shelved. The game was released with a Children's Computer Workshop cartridge label, which was used on very few games for the Atari 2600. Snoopy and the Red Baron was the only released game in Atari, Inc.'s Peanuts series, having a planned but unreleased game titled Good Luck, Charlie Brown.
