= Motor Mayhem =

2001 video game

Motor Mayhem: Vehicular Combat League
- Developer: Beyond Games
- Publisher: Infogrames
- Platform: PlayStation 2
- Release: NA: July 2, 2001; EU: November 23, 2001; AU: November 30, 2001
- Genre: Vehicular combat
- Modes: Single-player, multiplayer

V.C.L.: Vehicular Combat League Presents - Motor Mayhem, also known as simply Motor Mayhem, is a vehicular combat game developed by Beyond Games and published by Infogrames for PlayStation 2 in 2001.

== Gameplay ==
Similar to other arena-based vehicular combat games like Twisted Metal, Motor Mayhem is a game based on the concept of a violent and futuristic motor-sport event. The player directly controls a customized combat vehicle in a land-based arena and battles against another player or computer controlled opponents. Each vehicle has a distinctive character and unique special attacks. Each themed arena has additional weapons and upgrades for the vehicles to pick up. Points are awarded for the destruction of an enemy vehicle. The first contestant to achieve a target score, or that has the highest score when time expires, is the winner.

== Reception ==
Reception

Aggregate score
Aggregator	Score
Metacritic	59/100

Review scores
Publication	Score
Consoles +	75%
Computer and Video Games	7/10
Game Informer	7/10
GameRevolution	C
GameSpot	7.2/10
GameZone	7.5/10
IGN	6.8/10
Next Generation	3/5
Official U.S. PlayStation Magazine	3/5
PlayStation: The Official Magazine	8/10
The Cincinnati Enquirer	4/5

The game received "mixed" reviews according to the review aggregation website Metacritic. Daniel Erickson of NextGen called it "An inoffensive offering that falls short of the competition." Dan Elektro of GamePro quoted William Shakespeare's Macbeth in calling it "a game full of sound and fury, signifying nothing." (Note: GamePro gave the game 3/5 for graphics, 2.5/5 for sound, 1/5 for control, and 1.5/5 for fun factor.)
