= Club Drive =

1994 video game

- Cover art by Erik Olson
- Developer: Atari Corporation
- Publisher: Atari Corporation
- Producer: James Hampton
- Programmer: Todd Powers
- Artist: Ed Pearson
- Composers: James Grunke; Jerry Gerber; Michael Stevens; R. Wiley Evans
- Platform: Atari Jaguar
- Release: NA: November 1994; EU: December 1994
- Genre: Sim racing
- Modes: Single-player, multiplayer

Club Drive is a 1994 racing simulation video game developed and published by Atari Corporation for the Atari Jaguar. The game is set in a car-friendly amusement park where players can engage in different modes like racing, tag, or item collecting. The game allows exploration of various themed arenas, with each mode featuring its own set of rules and objectives for competitive play.

Club Drive was conceived by lead programmer Todd Powers and produced by James "Purple" Hampton. The team wanted to make an open world game with striking environments where the player drove a car in the style of Hot Wheels. Atari did not know how to market the game and pressured Powers into making it a more serious racing title. The game was intended to feature online play via the Jaguar Voice/Data Communicator, but was developed without online features due to the modem's cancellation.

Journalists gave Club Drive unfavorable reviews for its visuals and gameplay, with limited praise for its multiplayer and exploration. Retrospective commentary has been mixed, with several journalists calling it one of the worst video games of all time.

== Gameplay ==

Top: Collect mode gameplay.
Bottom: Race mode gameplay.

Club Drive is a racing simulation game. The story takes place at a car-friendly amusement park, which opened to cars after Dr. Lawrence Phosphorus developed algorithms to create indestructible vehicles. Gameplay consists of three modes: Collect, Racing, and Tag. Collect is a scored competition where the winner must capture a specific number of power balls from across the playfield. Racing is a race mode in which players must cross a series of lap checkpoints. Tag is a playground-style mode where players attempt to tag each other before time runs out.

The game features four selectable areas: Velocity Park, San Francisco, Old West, and Jerome's Pad. A hidden world, Planet Todd, can be accessed by entering a cheat code on the select screen. Each area has two distinct arenas, with one for Racing mode and a smaller one for Collect and Tag modes respectively. The player can drive anywhere and explore each area to uncover hidden locations.

During races, the players can select multiple viewpoints and change music on the vehicle's radio. The player can also enable a rewind function to replay mistakes. Before each race, players also have the option to select between one or two players, and select their vehicle's color and speed.

== Development and release ==
Club Drive was developed by Atari. The game was conceived by lead programmer Todd Powers, with Eric Ginner and Jerome Strach providing additional programming support, and produced by James "Purple" Hampton, who had worked on Trevor McFur in the Crescent Galaxy and Alien vs Predator for the Atari Jaguar. Ginner and Strach previously worked together on five Atari Lynx titles, such as Checkered Flag (1991) and Batman Returns (1992). It was Ginner's last game at Atari before leaving to join Bitmasters, a company founded by former Atari Games staffers Dave O'Riva and Franz Lanzinger. Ed Pearson led the team of animators that also included B.J. West, who created the dashboard artwork. The music was composed by James Grunke, Jerry Gerber, Michael Stevens and R. Wiley Evans, who also handled the game's sound effects. The cover art was illustrated by Erik Olson.

The team wanted to create an open world game with eye-catching environments where the player drove a car in the style of Hot Wheels, an idea Hampton liked. However, according to West, Atari did not know how to market Powers' gameplay concept and pressured him to turn Club Drive into a more serious racing title. West stated that Powers' gameplay concept was best showcased in Jerome's Pad, an area named after Strach. Production of the project took less than twelve months, with Powers writing the game's rendering and physics systems by himself. The game was originally planned to feature online multiplayer through Phylon, Inc.'s Jaguar Voice/Data Communicator, but was developed without online features due to the modem's delay and eventual cancellation.

Club Drive was unveiled as one of the first Jaguar games at a press conference held by Atari on August 18, 1993, with a planned release in the first quarter of 1994. It made other appearances at the 1994 Winter Consumer Electronics Show, the 1994 ECTS Spring, and the 1994 Summer Consumer Electronics Show. The game was also featured at the London Planetarium in 1994, where the press and attendees laughed at it, much to the frustration of Atari marketing manager Darryl Still. It was first released in North America in November 1994, followed by Europe in December 1994. Mumin Corporation published the game in Japan on March 24, 1995, while Products Final handled distribution in Spain.

== Reception ==
Reception

Review scores
Publication	Score
Computer and Video Games	72/100
Game Informer	6/10
Game Players	35%
GamesMaster	66%
Joypad	50%
M! Games	39%
Next Generation	1/5
Super Game Power	4.2/5
Video Games (DE)	35%
Atari Gaming Headquarters	2/10
Digital Press	5/10
Play Time	20%
ST-Computer	60%
Ultimate Future Games	49%
VideoGames	3/10

According to Atari, Club Drive sold 13,994 copies by April 1995. The game received generally unfavorable reviews. (Note: Attributed to multiple references: Atari Explorer Online, Games World, Player One, STart Micro, and Jaguar.)

GamesMaster's Les Ellis found the game very frustrating, criticizing its audiovisual department and unrealistic car handling, stating that "if it wasn't for the two player mode this would be a complete waste of time". Super Game Power commended its multiplayer mode, but noted that the graphics were not the game's strongest aspect. Game Informer stated that "This game will provide entertainment, particularly in the two-player split-screen mode".

GameFan praised the ability to drive and explore anywhere within the different environments, but faulted the game's limited play mechanics, blocky graphics, and controls. MAN!AC's Martin Gaksch considered Club Drive to be moderately innovative due to the ability to drive in any direction, but felt that the Jaguar had more to offer graphically. GamePro's Quick-Draw McGraw described Club Drive as an "unusual experience" compared to other contemporary racing simulators, but faulted its repetitive gameplay and "unfulfilled potential". An editor for German publication ST-Computer said the game is fun to play but criticized the visuals. Digital Press' Edward Villalpando said its gameplay was more fun than Checkered Flag on the Jaguar, but commented that the polygonal graphics looked unfinished and the controls were touchy.

Computer and Video Games' Edward Lawrence and Mark Patterson commended its graphical department, but criticized its jerky framerate and vacuous gameplay. Ultimate Future Games commended its ideas and polygon visuals, but criticized the dull gameplay and sound. Atari Gaming Headquarters' Keita Iida liked the flat-shaded polygonal visuals, but panned its choppy framerate, sluggish controls, and overall execution of the two-player mode. Joypad's Nini Nourdine found the vehicle easy to control, but noted the limited split-screen view in multiplayer.

Game Players lambasted the poor polygonal visuals and stated that the split-screen two-player mode further exacerbated the issue. Video Games' Wolfgang Schaedle noted the sensitive controls and faulted its gameplay. VideoGames panned its chunky graphics and frustrating controls. Play Time's Stephan Girlich panned the game's low-detail graphics and poor audio. Next Generation was outright critical, lambasting its sluggish framerate, cumbersome physics, and tepid gameplay. VideoGames later named it one of the worst games of the year.

=== Retrospective coverage ===
In retrospectives, Club Drive has been listed among the worst games of all time by Electronic Gaming Monthly, writer Seanbaby, and GamesRadar. In 2002, neXGam also called it "perhaps the worst Jaguar game ever". That same year, Game Informer regarded it as "a pathetic attempt at using polygons to convey realism in a driving game". The Atari Times' Jess LaFleur found the game entertaining at times, but criticized its graphics, sound, and music. Author Andy Slaven labelled it as an "awful" racing game. In a 2022 review of Atari 50, IGN's Samuel Claiborn stated that Club Drive is "a pretty remarkable tech accomplishment but also a fun foil to, say, Super Mario 64, which did 3D so much better just two years later". In 2024, Destructoid's Zoey Handley wrote that the game failed to showcase the Jaguar's capabilities.

== Legacy ==
Visual Dimensions 3D was inspired to develop Automaniacs as a spiritual successor to Club Drive for the Atari Jaguar. This game was announced at JagFest '97, a show dedicated to the Jaguar scene, but was never released. In 2008, the hobbyist community Jaguar Sector II released the game's source code in its Jaguar Source Code Collection. In 2022, Club Drive was included in the Atari 50 compilation for Windows, the Nintendo Switch, PlayStation 4, and Xbox One, marking its first re-release.
