= Alien vs Predator (Atari Jaguar video game) =

1994 video game

- Cover art by Andrew H. Denton
- Developer: Rebellion Developments
- Publisher: Atari Corporation
- Producer: James Hampton
- Designer: Sean Patten
- Programmers: Andrew Whittaker; Mike Beaton
- Artists: Stuart Wilson; Toby Harrison-Banfield
- Writers: Chris Hudak; Lance J. Lewis
- Composer: James Grunke
- Platform: Atari Jaguar
- Release: UK: October 20, 1994; NA: October 21, 1994; DE: October 26, 1994
- Genre: First-person shooter
- Mode: Single-player

Alien vs Predator (AVP) is a 1994 first-person shooter video game developed by Rebellion Developments and published by Atari for the Atari Jaguar. It is Rebellion's first work in the Alien vs. Predator franchise. Set in a simulation depicting the Golgotha training base, the game offers three character scenarios where the player takes on the role of an Alien, a Predator, or a human from the Colonial Marines. Each character has different objectives, weapons, and abilities, as well as distinct advantages and disadvantages.

AVP originally started as a project for the Atari Lynx handheld. Atari acquired a sub-license of the Super Nintendo Entertainment System video game through Activision and commissioned a Lynx port to Images Software. Producer James "Purple" Hampton felt this direction did not do justice to the characters, leading to Images Software redesigning the Lynx version into a first-person shooter, but production was suspended when Atari focused its efforts on the Jaguar. Rebellion subsequently secured a contract with Atari to work on a Jaguar version based on Images Software's initial work. Several issues caused a delay in the game's release and extended the production cycle beyond what Atari had stipulated.

AVP on the Jaguar garnered generally favorable reviews and earned several awards from gaming publications. Critics praised the character selection, impressive environments, and terrifying atmosphere. Some reviewers had mixed opinions about the game's audio, while criticisms focused on the monotonous gameplay, complex controls, the acid pools left behind by perished Aliens, and the low frame rate. Retrospective commentary in the years following its release have hailed it as one of the best titles for the Jaguar.

Atari had begun discussions with Beyond Games about developing a sequel for the Atari Jaguar CD, but abandoned negotiations due to licensing issues with 20th Century Fox, shortly before the Jaguar was officially discontinued. The ideas that Atari conceived and provided to 20th Century Fox for the unreleased Jaguar CD sequel were later used by Rebellion in Aliens Versus Predator (1999) for PC.

== Gameplay ==

- Top: The Alien biting a Predator while a cocooned Colonial Marine is seen in the distance
- Middle: The Predator stabbing a Colonial Marine with the wrist blade
- Bottom: Colonial Marine Lance J. Lewis kills an Alien with a shotgun

Alien vs Predator is a first-person shooter game. The premise unfolds in a simulation depicting Golgotha, a Colonial Marines training base that was overrun by two extraterrestrial species. The player can choose one of three character scenarios, assuming the role of an Alien, a Predator, or a human from the Colonial Marines. Each character has different objectives, weapons, and abilities, as well as distinct advantages and disadvantages. The player is introduced to the base, which consists of five sublevels interconnected by elevators and air ducts, as well as the docked Alien and Predator ships.

Playing as an Alien, the objective is to rescue the Alien queen held captive on the Predator ship. The player kills enemies using the Alien's claw, retractable jaw, and tail. The Alien is fast but unable to heal itself, and can only survive by turning Marines into cocoons. The player must use a combination of claw-tail-claw attacks to infect up to three Marines with an embryo and turn them into Alien eggs by walking over their bodies. The embryos act as extra lives and go through twelve stages of growth to transform a Marine into an Alien. After an Alien dies, the player respawns in the same location where a fully developed egg hatched. The Alien cannot use elevators and instead travels between sublevels through air ducts.

Playing as a Predator, the objective is to kill the Alien queen and claim her skull. The Predator initially comes equipped with a health restorer that can be refilled by collecting food and medkits, an audio oscilloscope that reacts to nearby enemies, and a wrist blade. The player can also turn invisible to avoid Marines and select one of five different infrared filters during this period. The invisibility camouflage does not work against Aliens, as they can detect the player, while Marines can notice the Predator's presence if distance is not maintained. The player can gain access to a combistick, a smart disc, and a shoulder mounted plasma-powered cannon by killing enemies and earning points. Points are awarded based on whether enemies are killed at close or long range. Weapons are obtained upon reaching certain point thresholds, but killing enemies while invisible results in the loss of points and access to weapons. The Predator can use elevators to move between sublevels, but it cannot pass through air ducts.

Playing as private Lance J. Lewis of the Colonial Marines, the objective is to escape the base infested with Aliens and Predators, activate the self-destruct mechanism, and leave the area in an escape pod. Lewis is released on sublevel 3 after serving a brig sentence without weapons, security clearance, or a motion tracker. The player can obtain a shotgun, a pulse rifle, a flamethrower, and a smart gun from fallen Marines to fend off enemies. Lewis can traverse the sublevels via elevators and Alien-infested air ducts, and the player must find security cards from deceased staff to unlock doors and access computer terminals. A level 10 security card is required to access the self-destruct mechanism at the command center on sublevel 2. The motion tracker can also be found on a fallen Marine in sublevel 5. The player can collect ammo to reload their weapons, as well as food and medkits to restore health. Lewis can access computer terminals to view the map, learn about the incident at the base, and recover health. However, the amount of health to be recovered depends on the player's security card level.

The player must kill Aliens from a distance to avoid damage, as killing them at close range causes them to spray acidic blood. A dead Alien also leaves behind a harmful acid pool, so it must be eliminated in an open room rather than a corridor. Otherwise, the player will be forced to walk through the acid pool. Upon approaching an Alien egg, a Facehugger emerges that will drain the player's health and which they must shake off. The game is over when a character's health is depleted. Progress can be saved manually at any time; however, defeated enemies respawn and item locations are randomized upon resuming play.

== Production ==
=== Background ===
In the 1980s, 20th Century Fox released the Alien and Predator films, and Dark Horse Comics began publishing licensed Aliens vs. Predator (AVP) comics. AVP for the Atari Jaguar originally started as a project for the Atari Lynx handheld. Atari's Chicago office, which handled production of most Lynx titles, had acquired a sub-license of the Super Nintendo Entertainment System (SNES) video game through Activision prior to its release, and commissioned Images Software to develop a Lynx port of the game. James "Purple" Hampton, who previously worked as a tester at Lucasfilm Games, joined Atari in 1992 as a producer for several Lynx titles that Atari wanted to release before the Jaguar's launch, AVP being one of them. Hampton felt that the direction the SNES game took did not do justice to the Alien and Predator characters, so Images Software agreed retooling the project into a first-person shooter where the player could control a human, an Alien, or a Predator. However, production was suspended when Atari closed its Chicago office and focused its efforts on the Jaguar. Hampton later worked as a producer and designer for Trevor McFur in the Crescent Galaxy, before serving as a producer for AVP on the Jaguar.

In 1992, brothers Jason and Chris Kingsley, after completing their academic studies and working as freelancers for various companies, founded Rebellion Developments to create their own video games, and launched their first title, Eye of the Storm, a year later. When Atari announced the Atari Falcon, Rebellion prepared a 3D flight game demo, in which dragons fought Viking ships, and presented it at Atari's Slough office. Impressed by the game's 3D engine, Atari Europe CEO Bob Gleadow said it could be a great title for the Jaguar, as Atari was seeking games for the platform and asked Rebellion if they could work on it. The demo never became a full game, but Atari staffer Jon Treanor told Rebellion that they owned the AVP license for a game.

After attending a conference where Atari showcased the Jaguar's hardware specifications and developers presented game proposals, Rebellion secured a contract to work on a Jaguar version of AVP in 1993. This prompted Rebellion, which operated out of the basement of the Kingsley brothers' parents, to move into an office and hire staff, while Atari provided Jaguar development kits. After finishing ATAC: The Secret War Against Drugs (1992) for Argonaut Software, Mike Beaton looked for another project and contacted acquaintances who learned that Rebellion needed a 3D programmer. Andrew Whittaker began his career in the computer industry in 1980, working on computer games before being hired by Rebellion. Beaton and Whittaker were the co-programmers of AVP.

=== Development ===
The unreleased Atari Lynx version of AVP by Images Software served as the basis for the Atari Jaguar version by Rebellion Developments

During the initial pre-production phase, Atari shared with Rebellion the design documents from the Lynx version, while Hampton checked an internal bulletin board system (BBS) maintained by Tom Gillen, who also ran Atari's quality assurance (QA) and testing departments, where Lynx ROM files were uploaded. The Images Software team created a demo where the player could control either the Predator or Colonial Marine, navigating corridors infested with Aliens. Hampton discovered that the Lynx version, besides lacking a playable Alien character, also included characters and settings based on the Dark Horse Comics series, the rights to which Atari did not own. Although the contract stipulated a port of the SNES game, this gave Hampton a legal reason to justify a change of direction for the Jaguar version. Atari producer Ted Tahquechi and his wife, Carrie Tahquechi, organized movie marathons and invited the team to watch the Alien and Predator films on LaserDisc, creating an environment conducive to brainstorming sessions for the game. The Atari team also encouraged the Rebellion team to follow the same process, as they had never seen the Alien or Predator films. Atari and Rebellion exchanged ideas before reaching an agreement on a new design proposal based on Images Software's initial work, which presented the game to Activision and 20th Century Fox as a first-person shooter with the possibility of playing as all three factions.

Hampton acknowledged that Wolfenstein 3D influenced AVP, as he had played it before working for Atari and wanted to create a similar game. The Kingsley brothers, on the other hand, took cues from dungeon crawlers, and did not learn about Wolfenstein 3D until halfway through production. Beaton was inspired by the limited freedom of movement in Wolfenstein 3D to make something similar for the Jaguar. The team was also encouraged to play titles like Doom (1993), which led them to want to achieve the same level of intensity and unsettling feeling. Rebellion sent the Atari team preliminary versions of the game, which consisted of traversing a randomly generated level, killing enemies, finding a key, and advancing to the next level. The game had been in production for ten months, longer than established in the contract, and its release was scheduled for April 1994. However, it lacked a narrative structure, and the Alien and Predator scenarios had not yet been implemented. The budget stipulated by Atari had also been exhausted, resulting in both Beaton and Whittaker not receiving their salaries and informing Hampton of the issue. Beaton and Whittaker were also forced to redo parts of their code, as production began before the development kits were finalized and Rebellion was constantly receiving revised kits, causing delays. Hampton proposed to Atari president Sam Tramiel extending the development cycle, bringing the programmers to work at Atari's Sunnyvale headquarters to finish the game, and increasing the cartridge capacity, to which Sam agreed. Hampton stated that the additional development time saved the game from potentially being shovelware.

Hampton needed staff for level design, as he wanted the game to be fun and dynamic in every playthrough. Gillen agreed to convert his testing crew into level designers and rearranged their schedules so they could focus on the task. Sean Patten led the level design team, which included Dan McNamee and Lance J. Lewis. The designers devised the plot, layout of the base, and item placement. Lewis, along with Chris Hudak, also wrote the text for the computer terminals and the game's introductory sequence, respectively. Each designer was assigned a level and drew it using graph paper and colored pens. McNamee was in charge of the medical laboratories and the training maze. The designers strived for a non-linear feel, as each level had to be designed for all three scenarios. They also wanted each scenario to be distinct, with particular attention given to the Colonial Marine campaign. The levels would be implemented by Rebellion's programmers, and the designers would ensure they were playable during the debugging process. Originally, the levels were designed on a 64x64 grid, but issues with Rebellion's game engine forced reducing the grid to a 32x32 size. The Marine character was named after Lewis, as Hampton thought it would be funny including his name in the game. Lewis was asked if he wanted his name removed, but he refused, taking it as a sign of gratitude for dedicating his time to it. Several ideas were planned, such as a grenade launcher weapon, a jump attack for the Alien, and local area network (LAN) play, but these were discarded due to time constraints.

Whittaker was responsible for the enemy AI, whose function is to chase the player through the level. The AI, dubbed "Alien Chess", took six months to write. The game's 3D engine, which Whittaker also worked on, ran at a high frame rate, but slowed down to 10-15 frames per second (fps) when integrating the sprites and AI. At one point, Whittaker became stressed and wanted to go to his parents' house in Hull, so he invited Beaton over to keep coding the game in a spare room. Beaton got the Predator's vision modes working and embarked on a sleepless marathon to get the Alien's heads-up display (HUD) working the way he intended. AVP was finished and approved by 20th Century Fox in August 1994.

=== Visual and audio design ===
Rebellion artists Stuart Wilson and Toby Harrison-Banfield created the textures in AVP for the Jaguar using bathroom tiles

The graphics were initially created using pixel art, but were deemed not to be realistic enough. The Rebellion team repeatedly watched the Alien and Predator films on VHS, photographing the television screen to obtain frames and choosing visual effects that would look good in the game. Rebellion artists Stuart Wilson and Toby Harrison-Banfield suggested using models instead, thus establishing the art direction of AVP. Both Wilson and Banfield built the textures of the ceilings, walls, and floors using bathroom tiles along with materials such as wax and resin. These were then airbrushed, photographed, and digitized as bitmap graphics. The Jaguar's Blitter processor and GPU are used separately to draw and calculate surfaces.

A similar process was applied with pre-fabricated models for the Alien and Predator characters. The Kingsley brothers acquired licensed models from a local shop, which were then airbrushed and photographed with a 35mm camera. Rebellion repeatedly ordered an Alien queen model from different suppliers, but HM Customs and Excise did not allow its shipment to Oxford because H. R. Giger's work was classified as pornographic material. Hampton located an Alien queen model in stock at Mr. Big Toyland, a store in Waltham that imported Japanese items, and smuggled it in a suitcase so he could deliver it to Rebellion's offices. The results were scanned and retouched frame by frame in Deluxe Paint to create stop-motion animation for the sprite of each character. Patten, a fan of the Alien franchise, built replicas of the Marines' equipment from the films, some of which were used in the game, while his likeness was used as a portrait for the character's HUD. Artist Andrew H. Denton created the cover illustration and title screen using LightWave 3D.

The in-game visuals are rendered in high color format, while the introductory sequence and menus are rendered in true color format. All graphics were compressed using JagPEG, Atari's adaptation of the JPEG format, which compresses assets to an approximate 8:1 ratio without loss of image quality. Compression of the graphical data took a lot of memory, which proved to be an issue for Rebellion, as they were initially limited to a two-megabyte (2MB) cartridge before its capacity was increased, since Fox wanted additional animation frames for the Alien queen.

James Grunke headed Atari's audio department, responsible for the game's music and sound effects, which included Gillen, Michael Stevens, Nathan Brenholdt, Paul Foster, and Will Davis, with additional input from Alex Quarmby of Rebellion. During the last month of production, the audio team dedicated most of the cartridge's increased memory capacity to sound effects. Grunke lent his voice to the Marine and Predator characters. Sandra Miller, wife of Richard Miller, chief hardware engineer of the Jaguar, recorded the dialogues for the computer terminals throughout the game. McNamee provided the sound effect of the Alien cocooning a Marine by eating an apple.

== Release ==
Alien vs Predator (AVP) was unveiled as one of the first Atari Jaguar games at a press conference held by Atari on August 18, 1993. The first playable version was shown at the 1994 Winter Consumer Electronics Show (WCES), but the game was delayed due to initial memory limitations, which led to an increase in cartridge capacity. The game reappeared at the 1994 European Computer Trade Show Spring (ECTS) event, and its final showcase prior to release took place at the 1994 Summer Consumer Electronics Show (SCES).

Atari first published AVP for the Jaguar in the United Kingdom on October 20, 1994, followed by North America on October 21, 1994, and later Germany on October 26, 1994. In France and Spain, it was distributed by Accord and Products Final respectively. To promote AVP, Atari launched an advertising campaign that included a television commercial produced at the same time the game was being shown at the 1994 SCES. Mumin Corporation included it as a pack-in game with the Jaguar in Japan on December 8, 1994. AVP was later released as a standalone title in Japan on February 17, 1995. That same year, a version of the game compatible with the Jaguar VR headset was announced, but it was never released, as Atari scrapped the Jaguar VR.

== Reception ==
Reception

Review scores
Publication	Score
AllGame	4.5/5
Computer and Video Games	90/100
Edge	4/10
Electronic Gaming Monthly	6/10, 7/10, 5/10, 5/10
EP Daily	9/10
Game Informer	9/10
Game Players	90%
GameFan	98/100, 98/100, 98/100
GamesMaster	95/100
Next Generation	4/5
ST Review	84%
Atari Explorer Online	4.5/5
Atari Gaming Headquarters	9/10
Digital Press	9/10
Electronic Games	A−
Entertainment Weekly	A
Game Zero Magazine	48/50
Games World	75/100
Ultimate Future Games	79%
VideoGames	9/10

Awards
Publication	Award
Game Informer (1994)	Jaguar Game of the Year
Game Players (1994)	Best Jaguar Game
GameFan (1994)	Best Action/Adventure (Jaguar)
VideoGames (1994)	Best Jaguar Game

Alien vs Predator (AVP) on the Atari Jaguar received generally favorable reception from critics. (Note: Attributed to multiple references:) The character selection feature was almost unanimously praised, in that unlike most games with a selection of player characters, the characters have not only different abilities but different objectives and play styles. (Note: Attributed to multiple references:) GamePro ventured to say that it would take the entire length of their two-page review to go over all the gameplay differences between the characters. Many reviews said the environments are impressively vast, giving players an abundance of area to explore. Most critics were also impressed by how the game makes the player experience a sense of dread and occasionally terror, with The Electric Playground's Victor Lucas calling it "landmark video game immersion". (Note: Attributed to multiple references:)

However, even the most positive reviews also levied a share of criticisms against the game. One of the most common was that there are occasional uneventful stretches. Many also found the controls overly complex and difficult to manage; Electronic Games' Steven L. Kent elaborated, "Jaguar's game pads have 17 buttons, and players still need to memorize button combinations to play this game. In the thick of a battle, it's hard to remember that button number four controls the gatling gun and that the option button fires the grenades." Some critics disliked the mechanic of slain Aliens leaving behind pools of acid that damage the player character, arguing that it should have been possible to jump over or otherwise avoid these pools. (Note: Attributed to multiple references:) While the graphics were generally considered impressive, especially the backgrounds, some critics noted that they came at the costs of slower game speed, choppier animation, and more obvious close-range pixelation when compared to less photorealistic first-person shooters such as Wolfenstein 3D and Doom. (Note: Attributed to multiple references:)

Most reviewers, though, concluded that these problems do not detract from the overall experience. Mark Patterson of Computer and Video Games (CVG), for example, said that "Apart from the graphics, the individual components of the game such as the characters on their own and the occasional dull period aren't outstanding, but together do justice to an extraordinarily tricky license." Lucas called the criticisms "minor quibbles" and said that though his review was coming almost a year after the game's release, AVP was still a must-play experience. Next Generation commented that "the game is plagued with ultra-slow load times that really shouldn't be present in a cartridge release. Controls aren't as easy as they could be (sidestep and weapon select buttons are difficult to get to in a heated fight), but neither of these quirks stops AVP from delivering some really good play. Definitely the best Jaguar title we've seen so far." Ultimate Future Games also described it as the best Jaguar game to date, though they noted that they expected the Jaguar version of Doom would be better. The four-person review team of Electronic Gaming Monthly (EGM) were among the few to find AVP underwhelming, with Sushi-X summarizing, "I like the whole Alien and Predator idea but this doesn't reflect the action of the comics or other games." They all found the game has good aspects but that the gameplay was not strong enough to stand out. Edge gave it an outright negative review, arguing that the acclaimed character selection does not add to the depth or replay value at all: "Whichever character you choose, you end up doing essentially the same thing: wandering aimlessly through corridors in search of enemies to kill. Occasionally you have a brief, violent and ultimately pointless encounter with a lone enemy before continuing on your way, but the truth is that Rebellion haven't been able to make the 'search and destroy' gameplay in AVP anywhere near as enjoyable as it is in Doom." By contrast, Game Informer's three consultants unanimously recommended AVP. One of them, Andrew McNamara, summarized, "This complex, very difficult, and highly addictive game will have you sitting on the edge of your seat searching for the next item, praying that the Aliens won't get you first."

Opinions on the game's minimal audio varied. CVG's "second opinion" reviewer Rik Skews felt that there was too much silence and that the game should have had at least footsteps, and Edge, Lucas, and EGM's Ed Semrad all felt the absence of music made the game less suspenseful and showed a lack of polish. However, Lucas, along with Patterson, Paul Anderson of Game Informer, and GamePro, also felt that the relatively few sound effects and the authenticity of what sounds there are creates a haunting quietude and immerses the player more fully. GamesMaster's Marcus Hawkins said that music would have dispelled the game's incredible tension, and lauded the sound effects, concluding, "Never before has so little had so much impact."

=== Sales and accolades ===
According to internal Atari documentation, AVP on the Jaguar had sold 52,223 copies as of April 1, 1995, although a July 1995 supplement to Edge magazine indicated that over 85,000 copies were sold worldwide. Game Players awarded it "Best Jaguar Game" in their second annual video game awards. Game Informer awarded it "Jaguar Game of the Year" in their third annual video game awards. GameFan awarded it "Best Action/Adventure" game on the Jaguar in their third Megawards edition. VideoGames also awarded it "Best Jaguar Game" of 1994, over Doom and Tempest 2000. Flux magazine ranked it 60th on their list of "Top 100 Video Games". In 1996, ST Format named it one of the ten best games for the Jaguar. That same year, GamesMaster ranked the game as number three on their "GamesMaster Jaguar Top Five".

=== Retrospective coverage ===
In retrospectives, AVP has been listed among the best Jaguar games by GamesTM, Retro Gamer, HobbyConsolas, and Time Extension. In a 2003 retrospective, Polish magazine Click! Konsole hailed it as "a legend of FPS games", highlighting its visuals, three distinctive characters, and unique atmosphere. Writing for MyAtari magazine, Robert Jung lauded the game's overall concept, audiovisual presentation, engaging gameplay, and the three characters' campaigns, but viewed the choppy frame rate, lack of a run button, and inability to configure the controls as shortcomings. In 2006, GameTrailers ranked it 4th on their list of "Top Ten Scariest Games", noting that while creepy on its own, most of the scares came from an Alien sneaking up behind the player with hardly a sound to warn them.

In a 2009 retrospective, André Forte of Brazilian magazine OLD!Gamer considered AVP to be one of the few titles that demonstrated the Jaguar's power. In a 2013 feature for 1UP.com, Jeremy Parish opined that, while the game had not aged well due to its poor AI and rough graphics, it was still fun thanks to the strategies required for each race. In 2014, Prima Games ranked it 29th on their list of "The 50 Scariest Video Games of All Time", stating that "Although playing as either Alien or Predator is a superb experience, the real terror lies in playing as a Marine. In that regard, you have to deal with both Aliens and Predators – with only a few weapons at that". Pete Davison of Rice Digital opined that the game was dated by modern standards, but found its open-structure design intriguing in contrast to its linear, level-based contemporaries and lamented its exclusion from the Atari 50 compilation.

== Legacy ==
Alien vs Predator (AVP) was Rebellion Developments' first work with the license and one of four projects for the Atari Jaguar. Others include Checkered Flag II (a Virtua Racing-style game programmed by Robert "Rob" Dibley), Cyberpunk City (a combat flight simulation game), and Dungeon (a Ultima Underworld-style game). Checkered Flag II would later be called Redline Racing before being changed and released in 1994 under its final title, Checkered Flag. Cyberpunk City would later be called Hammerhead before being changed to its final title, Skyhammer. Facing financial difficulties due to the Jaguar's commercial failure, Atari cancelled the release of Skyhammer and never paid Rebellion for having finished the game. Skyhammer was eventually released in 2000 after Rebellion licensed it to publisher Songbird Productions. Dungeon would later be titled Legions of the Undead and was intended to use an improved version of the AVP engine. However, Rebellion slowed down the game's production to finish AVP, and Atari ultimately cancelled it in 1995.

In a 1994 interview with Chris Bieniek for VideoGames magazine, James "Purple" Hampton stated that AVP for Atari Lynx would be released after the Atari Jaguar version. However, the Lynx version was never completed, as Atari halted production of Lynx projects and discontinued support for the console in order to focus on the Jaguar. In 2001, a prototype demo of the Lynx version was leaked online. In 2015, a member of the AtariAge community discovered a new prototype of the Lynx version. In 2017, Beta Phase Games announced that it would offer a limited physical edition of the unearthed prototype.

In 2008, the hobbyist community Jaguar Sector II released the game's source code in its Jaguar Source Code Collection. In 2019, developer Shane Ruetz released an unofficial remake in Unreal Engine 4 for Microsoft Windows as freeware. In 2023, video game programmer Rich Whitehouse implemented multiplayer support in AVP for the Jaguar emulator BigPEmu, allowing up to 32 players to participate.

=== Unreleased follow-up ===
Following the release of AVP for the Jaguar, Hampton and the Atari team convened at Ted Tahquechi's home, where they rewatched the Alien and Predator films to exchange ideas they wanted to include into an expanded CD version of AVP. In 1995, Alien vs Predator: The CD/Alien vs Predator 2: Annihilation (AVP: The CD/AVP 2: Annihilation) was announced for the Atari Jaguar CD, planning for a February 1996 release date. After the launch of Ultra Vortek, Atari invited Beyond Games to discuss their interest in making a sequel to AVP for the Jaguar CD. According to former Beyond Games staffers Kris Johnson and Clark Stacey, their sequel would focus on story and feature plenty of action. The project was approved by both 20th Century Fox and Atari, becoming Beyond Games' main development focus. In 1996, Atari abandoned negotiations with 20th Century Fox due to licensing issues, shortly before discontinuing the Jaguar platform and leaving the console market to merge with JTS, resulting in the project's cancellation during the planning phase. However, Johnson and Stacey claimed that 20th Century Fox scrapped the project because they felt the plot had become too drawn out and did not want to add new lore into the franchise without further oversight.

In 1995, Fox Interactive also announced AVP for PC, PlayStation, and Sega Saturn, with a planned release in early 1997. Michael "Mike" Arkin, who left Acclaim Entertainment and joined Fox Interactive, wanted to make another AVP title. Arkin contacted Rebellion and commissioned them to take on the project, which they accepted due to their relationship with 20th Century Fox. Production began in 1996 with 3D levels and 2D character sprites, but Rebellion later restructured the game with polygonal character models and focused exclusively on the PC platform, abandoning the PlayStation and Saturn versions. Rebellion also integrated ideas provided by 20th Century Fox, which Atari had compiled in a design document submitted for AVP: The CD/AVP 2: Annihilation. The game was released in 1999 for PC under its final name, Aliens Versus Predator, achieving similar critical success.

== See also ==
- List of Alien, Predator, and Alien vs. Predator games
