= Legions of the Undead =

- Developer(s): Rebellion Developments
- Publisher(s): Atari Corporation (Jaguar)
- Director(s): Jason Kingsley
- Programmer(s): Dan Mitchell; Jamie Lokier
- Artist(s): Justin Rae; Stuart Wilson; Toby Harrison-Banfield
- Engine: AVP (Jaguar)
- Platform(s): Atari Jaguar; Windows; PlayStation
- Release: Unreleased
- Genre(s): Action role-playing, dungeon crawler, first-person
- Mode(s): Single-player

Legions of the Undead is an unreleased action role-playing video game that was in development by Rebellion Developments and originally planned to be published by Atari Corporation on a scheduled Q3, 1995 release date for the Atari Jaguar. It was also intended to be released for the Windows and PlayStation.

When an ancient evil known as Centurion Gargath manifested himself into the human realm with plans to consume the souls of those under his range, it is up to the player to find and kill Gargath by traversing through the dungeons where he resides, while collecting weapons and solving puzzles along the way. Legions of the Undead was one of the many titles Rebellion originally had under development for the Jaguar and it used an enhanced version of the engine found in Alien vs Predator.

== Gameplay ==
Legions of the Undead is an action role-playing game that takes place from a first-person perspective presented with two-dimensional digitized sprites on a three-dimensional environment, similar to other titles in the genre such as Ultima Underworld: The Stygian Abyss. The player would be tasked with entering multiple dungeons in order to find and kill an ancient evil known as Centurion Gargath, who manifested himself on the human plane and consumes the souls of those within his range. As the game used an enhanced version of the engine found in Alien vs Predator on the Jaguar, the player has the ability to look up and down in the environment. Players would also need to collect weapons and solve puzzles during their journey.

== History ==
The project was first revealed and announced in early 1994 for the Atari Jaguar under the name Dungeon, along with concept artwork and model figures from the game. It was being developed in tandem with other titles Rebellion had under development for the Jaguar such as Alien vs Predator, Checkered Flag (then titled Checkered Flag II and later Redline Racing) and Skyhammer (then titled Hammerhead), however, it was revealed on Atari Explorer Online's March 1994 newsletter that the title of the game was changed to Legions of the Undead and that it would be published by Atari Corporation. In two 1994 interviews by both GameFan and GamePro, Rebellion revealed more info about the project such as using an enhanced version of the game engine found in Alien vs Predator. Although the game was being developed for the Jaguar, Rebellion also stated that they had plans to release it on the then-upcoming Atari Jaguar CD as well with more features than the cartridge version. Legions of the Undead was then previewed as 25 percent complete in Ultimate Future Games, touting it for an early 1995 release and discussing the features the game would have. Most of the game's development team consisted of the same staff who previously worked on both Alien vs Predator and Checkered Flag such as artists Stuart Wilson, Toby Harrison-Banfield, and Justin Rae, with Dan Mitchell and Jamie Lokier being the programmers of title.

Despite kept being advertised and featured in magazines during 1995, internal documents from Atari Corporation listed the project's development as terminated on December of the same year, suggesting that the game was cancelled for the Jaguar. On June 27, 1996, the game's trademark which revealed its subtitle was abandoned. It was also briefly mentioned on a special feature article dedicated to the system by German magazine Video Games in 1999. In recent years, Jason Kingsley has stated that some of the model figures used during the development of the game still reside within the company. Jason also stated that some of the work done for Legions of the Undead may still reside inside the company.
