= TRF =

TRF may refer to:

== Medicine and science ==
- Terminal restriction fragments, used in measuring telomere length
- Thyrotropin-releasing factor, a peptide hormone secreted by the hypothalamus
- Time-restricted feeding, a type of intermittent fasting
- Transfer RNA-derived fragment
- TERF1, Telomeric repeat-binding factor 1 (also known as TRF1)

== Places ==
- Sandefjord Airport, Torp, Norway, IATA code
- Thief River Falls, Minnesota, USA

== Organisations ==
- Tactical recognition flash, UK armed forces
- Texas Renaissance Festival, USA
- Thoroughbred Retirement Foundation, racehorse rescue organization
- TRF (group), a J-pop group
- Regional Federal Courts (Portuguese: Tribunais Regionais Federais), Brazilian Federal appellate courts
- The Resistance Front, a separatist group in Indian Kashmir

== Other ==
- Tuned radio frequency receiver, a type of radio
- Trinidadian Creole, by ISO 639 code
- TRF1, French howitzer
- Thea Realm Fighters, unreleased fighting game for the Atari Jaguar
- Tropical rainforest, a tropical broadleaf forest with very high rainfall
