= Black ICE\White Noise =

- Preliminary cover art featuring the three planned playable characters
- Developer: Atari Corporation
- Publisher: Atari Corporation
- Directors: David Frost (Interactive Alliance Corp.)
- Producers: Faran Thomason; B.J. West
- Designers: B.J. West; Chris Hudak; Keoni Chavez; Sean Patten
- Programmers: Ken Rose; Pradip Fatepuria; Scott Chandler
- Artists: Bryce Nakagawa; Chris Thompson; Mira Soriano-Gillet
- Writers: B.J. West; Chris Hudak; Keoni Chavez
- Composer: Andy Armer
- Engine: Pradip Fatepuria
- Platform: Atari Jaguar CD
- Release: Unreleased
- Genre: Action-adventure
- Mode: Single-player

Black ICE\White Noise is an unreleased action-adventure video game that was in development and planned to be published by Atari Corporation on a scheduled December 1995 release date exclusively for the Atari Jaguar CD. It is influenced by the works of American-Canadian writer William Gibson such as Neuromancer and its plot is very reminiscent of The Matrix, which came three years later after the project was discontinued.

The player would have followed the story of a group of three characters in a fictional United States city in the year 2042, as they performed multiple missions and tasks such as assassination, computer hacking, exploration, street fighting and other assignments. Originally conceived internally in 1994 as a mascot platform game by Sam Tramiel to represent Atari Corp., it later evolved into a more mature title involving a cyberpunk setting.

After multiple delays and expenses, Atari Corp. cancelled the game in 1996, a decision seen by the video game press as an indication that the company was preparing to stop support for the Jaguar, especially as one of the other games for the system, Thea Realm Fighters, was also cancelled at the same time, with the game being close to completion. Although unreleased, several playable prototypes have been released and sold online by people such as B.J. West, one of the original producers of the game, and video game collector Clint Thompson, who got the rights to publish one of the playable prototypes.

== Gameplay ==
Gameplay screenshot from the released Revision 18.

Black ICE\White Noise is an action-adventure game that is played from a third-person view, taking place in a three-dimensional environment similar to Grand Theft Auto III, with two-dimensional digitized sprites and polygonal hovercraft vehicles flying across the city. The players would have participated in missions, which were linear scenarios with set main objectives, to progress through the plot and earn money upon their completion in some cases.

Outside the missions, the players could freely roam in the game's open world and would have the ability to perform jobs to earn money and complete optional side missions. The game takes place on the year 2042 in Loma Prieta, a fictional city situated in the Santa Clara Valley, California and it involves multiple streets and roads with multiple locations within the city.

Players could walk, jump, run or call a taxicab hovercraft to navigate in the game's city. During combat, players can either fight unarmed or with weapons that can auto-aim against enemy gangsters. If the player shoots any kind of gun outside buildings, the police will respond immediately against the player but they can also be killed. Players can also enter inside buildings and shops to talk with other non-player characters to be either hired for an assignment or buy new items, equipment and weapons.

There were going to be three playable characters in the final version of the game, two male and a female: Tyro, Crash and Misha, and each one would have their own set of skills and gear equipment but only Misha is playable in the released prototypes. Another gameplay element is the ability to enter into the C-Space cyberspace by the usage of a Deck item in real-time. Reminiscent of System Shock, players can freely explore the virtual space, but in the final version they would have the ability to hack vehicles, security systems, find hidden files and battle against other C-Space users.

== History ==
=== Background and conception ===
B.J. West began working for Atari Corporation in June 1993, five months prior to the release of the Jaguar in North America and worked on various games for the system from 1993 to 1994 as a graphic artist and animator such as Club Drive, Cybermorph and Trevor McFur in the Crescent Galaxy. After finishing his work on these games, Sam Tramiel and the executives at Atari Corp. had a SKU open for their next internal project but they did not have a set idea what it was going to be, with the team pitching multiple proposal ideas of varying genres, with the intention to create a mascot character to represent the company, similar to what Nintendo and Sega had with Mario and Sonic the Hedgehog, with one of the proposed characters being an alligator lawyer named Al E. Gator and among the furthest developed game pitches was a platform game starring an armadillo character titled Arlo Armadillo vs. The Bugs Below for the then-upcoming Jaguar CD. Faran Thomason, who was also one of the producers of the game, and B.J. West remarked that no one liked any of them and he proposed other game ideas after the platformer proposal was withdrawn. The team later came with the concept idea of a cyberpunk role-playing video game with influence from works of William Gibson that would later be titled Chaos Agenda, with B.J. West further backing the idea by creating with the internal team a design document and artwork, with Atari Corp. greenlighting it after realizing various focus tests with positive output.

=== Development ===
Black ICE\White Noise was previewed in 1994 under the name Chaos Agenda and was one of the first games announced for the Jaguar CD, where it was originally advertised that players could travel between multiple cities. It kept being advertised and previewed under the same name until August 1995, where it was still listed as an upcoming game for the add-on but under its final name. Ken Rose, lead programmer of the game, also worked unofficially as one of the managers for the project.

=== Cast ===
In a forum thread post at Giant Bomb, an Atari employee recounted about the casting and filming process of the Black ICE\White Noise's in-game characters. He stated that the team travelled to Los Angeles in order to film the game's playable characters and NPCs in a blue screen, similar to Mortal Kombat. Around thirty-four actors were cast for the game and among them are:

- Michiko Nishiwaki as Misha, a japanese street samurai for hire.
- Chris Hudak as Crash, a mirrorshaded alcoholic burnout. Chris previously worked as a writer for both Next Generation, Wired and online publications.
- Michael Long as Tyro, an Arsenio Hall-esque hacker.

=== Audio ===
Black ICE\White Noise - Soundtrack by Andy Armer

Soundtrack album by Andy Armer
- Released: 2007
- Recorded: 1995
- Studio: Atari Corporation
- Genre: Video game music
- Length: 29:46
- Language: English
- Label: Kelp Entertainment
- Producer: B.J. West

Originally, the team were in negotiations with American industrial rock band Nine Inch Nails to compose the soundtrack for Black ICE\White Noise, with his founder Trent Reznor showing interest in doing so but Atari Corp. offered a low amount of payment for the work and as a result, the deal did not happen. Instead the original soundtrack was created, composed and performed by Grammy award-nominee and former video game composer Andy Armer. Although it was never fully implemented into any of the released playable prototypes, it was officially released on CD by B.J. West under the label Kelp Entertainment. The game's sound effects were also never implemented into any of the released prototypes but have since been released by the defunct Jaguar Sector II website under a CD-ROM compilation for PC titled Jaguar Source Code Collection.

Track list
No.	Title	Length
1.	"Black ICE\White Noise" (Main theme)	3:17
2.	"St. Jude"	1:53
3.	"Shatter G"	2:29
4.	"Golem Tanks"	2:47
5.	"The Dragon's Claw"	4:56
6.	"Strut City"	2:22
7.	"Dia's Theme"	3:52
8.	"C-Space"	2:35
9.	"Attack of the Barlog"	1:52
10.	"Raid on MegaSoft"	3:07
11.	"Elevator Music"	0:36

=== Cancellation ===
After various delays and expenses, Atari Corp. cancelled the title in 1996, a decision that was seen by the gaming press as an indication that the company was preparing to stop support for the system. Plans for a film adaptation were also in development but negotiations were quickly stopped due to Atari demanding a high sum of money for the film rights. The game's source code has become lost due to Atari leaving the video game market after the system's commercial failure.

== Release ==
While Black ICE\White Noise was never officially released by Atari Corporation, 23 playable revisions of the game are known to exist, with 20 of them being in the hands of a private video game collector, and three of them were officially sold by B.J. West, who owns the rights to the IP after Atari Corporation merged with JT Storage in a reverse takeover on April 8, 1996.

=== Revisions 18 and 19 ===
Previously available as a free download, it is the first official physical release of the game, can be played on any Jaguar CD unit since it is encrypted and it is also one of the more stable playable builds. It was also released by video game collector Clint Thompson under the label Ambient Distortions, with permission from B.J. West himself, as a limited edition of 50 copies which came with a manual, strategy guide and a map. Likewise, another build similar to revision 18 labeled "Revision 19" was also released by B.J. West.

=== Revision 23 ===
A recently found playable revision and the last one before Atari Corp. cancelled the project. This build has elements not previously found in revision 18, however, some parts can potentially crash the game. Like revision 18, it is encrypted, making it playable on any Jaguar CD unit.
