= Skyhammer =

2000 video game

- Developer: Rebellion Developments
- Publisher: Songbird Productions
- Director: Jason Kingsley
- Producers: John Skruch; Ted Tahquechi
- Programmers: Alex Quarmby; Chris Fox; Chris Kingsley
- Artist: Justin Rae
- Platform: Atari Jaguar
- Release: WW: May 2000
- Genre: Shooter
- Mode: Single-player

Skyhammer is a 2000 shooter video game developed by Rebellion Developments for the Atari Jaguar. Set in the 21st century, where cyberspace has become synonymous with real life, the player assumes the role of a Skyhammer pilot who joins the Cytox corporation to fight against two rival corporations. The game consists of two modes, each with distinct objectives, in which the player battles enemies and earns credits in three cities.

Skyhammer was conceived by brothers Jason and Chris Kingsley, co-founders of Rebellion. Produced by John Skruch and Ted Tahquechi, who worked on Jaguar titles such as Cybermorph and Tempest 2000, Jason had envisioned the game for years, believing that the Jaguar was the console best equipped to bring his concept to completion. It was first announced in 1993 and later showcased at E3 1995, with Atari as the publisher. In 1996, Atari laid off several employees amid rumors that they would be leaving the console market, including Tahquechi. Faced with financial difficulties stemming from the commercial failure of the Jaguar, Atari cancelled the game's release and never paid Rebellion for finishing it.

After Atari ceased support for the Jaguar, a programmer named Carl Forhan obtained the rights to publish Skyhammer from Rebellion. Hasbro Interactive later made the Jaguar an open platform, allowing Forhan to release the game under his studio Songbird Productions. The game received generally favorable reviews both before its cancellation and after its release. Praise was given for its graphics and gameplay, but opinions on the sound and controls were mixed, while criticism focused on the visual repetitiveness of the buildings and its low frame rate.

== Gameplay ==
The player destroys a node while under fire from enemy tanks in Jericho, one of the three cities in Skyhammer

Skyhammer is a three-dimensional shooter game played from a first-person perspective. Publications such as Atari Gaming Headquarters and the German magazine Video Games have described it as a mix between Descent and G-Police. The premise unfolds in the 21st century, where cyberspace became synonymous with real life. One day, hackers introduced a virus that destroyed financial structures and made it impossible to determine ownership. Since then, the war between corporations intensified to the point where citizens had to choose between corporate servitude and crime. The government reaffirmed its authority by bombing corporate headquarters, but corporations found ways to fight each other without authorities noticing, ushering in the era of the Skyhammers. The player takes on the role of a Skyhammer pilot joining the Cytox corporation to fight against CFC and Grubertech, two rival corporations.

The player maneuvers the Skyhammer in any direction over a cityscape divided into zones and populated by enemies. One of two flight modes can be selected from the options menu: Normal and Advanced. In Normal mode, the ship is controlled like an airplane and is unaffected by gravity, except when the engine is damaged. In Advanced mode, the ship is controlled like a helicopter and is affected by gravity. The Skyhammer is equipped with a variety of weapons to combat enemies, including gatling guns, rockets, homing and smart missiles, bombs, an electronic countermeasure (ECM) system that detonates all homing missiles when fully charged, and smart bombs that annihilate all units within a wide area. The enemies range from airplanes and tanks to artillery batteries. The Skyhammer's cockpit displays several functions, including a message window, ECM system status, a fuel gauge, a target lock display, a shield/damage indicator, an altimeter, a short-range map scanner, and a weapon ammo indicator. The map scanner identifies friendly or enemy units, as well as the position of buildings, streets, nodes, missiles, and other objects around the Skyhammer. The player can also access a long-range map scanner that provides an overview of the entire city.

Gameplay consists of two modes: Mission and Battle. Mission is the default game mode in which the player must complete missions assigned by Cytox across three cities: Jericho, San Diablo, and Troy. Missions are generated randomly and may consist of retrieving an item within an enemy zone, searching for and destroying enemy groups, or defending Cytox nodes against enemies. The player will receive credits for defeated enemies and for successfully completing missions, which can be spent at Cybermart docking stations. At Cybermarts, the player can purchase ammo, fuel, engine and ECM system upgrades, as well as repair shields and damage dealt to the Skyhammer. The player can also travel between Cybermarts in other zones of the cities by paying a fee that depends on the distance to be traveled.

Battle is an arcade-style game mode, in which the main objective is to protect Cytox's territory from enemy attacks and destroy rival nodes to wrest control of the zone from CIC and Grubertech. If one of Cytox's nodes is destroyed, the zone is lost to the enemy and must be recaptured by destroying the enemy node and all its defenses. Once the entire city is occupied, the player must dock at a Cybermart to advance to the next city. The Skyhammer's shield is reduced if attacked by enemy fire, but it regenerates over time. Once depleted, the ship will suffer damage that can cripple its systems and render them inoperable. The game is over when the Skyhammer is destroyed or all territory is lost, although the player can resume their progress using a save function at Cybermarts. The game features support for the ProController.

== Development and release ==
Skyhammer was created by Rebellion Developments, which had previously developed Alien vs Predator and Checkered Flag for the Atari Jaguar. It was directed by Jason Kingsley, co-founder of Rebellion. John Skruch and Ted Tahquechi, who worked on several Jaguar titles such as Cybermorph and Tempest 2000, were the co-producers of the game at Atari. Jason's brother, Chris Kingsley, also a co-founder of Rebellion, participated in the game's creation as a co-programmer along with Alex Quarmby and Chris Fox. Justin Rae, who also worked on Checkered Flag for the Jaguar, was one of the Rebellion artists responsible for the game's artwork. The Kingsley brothers came up with the game's concept, which had been brewing in Jason's mind for six years. He believed the Jaguar was the first console that could do the game justice, and in 1992, Chris Kingsley drafted a design document for it. Skyhammer uses an optimized version of the 3D engine created by Rebellion for the Jaguar, with support for animated buildings, depth-shaded polygons, and distance fog to reduce the amount of scenery needed to be rendered and maintain a stable frame rate. The ship's cockpit was modeled in wood by Bernard H. Wood, and later scanned and used in-game.

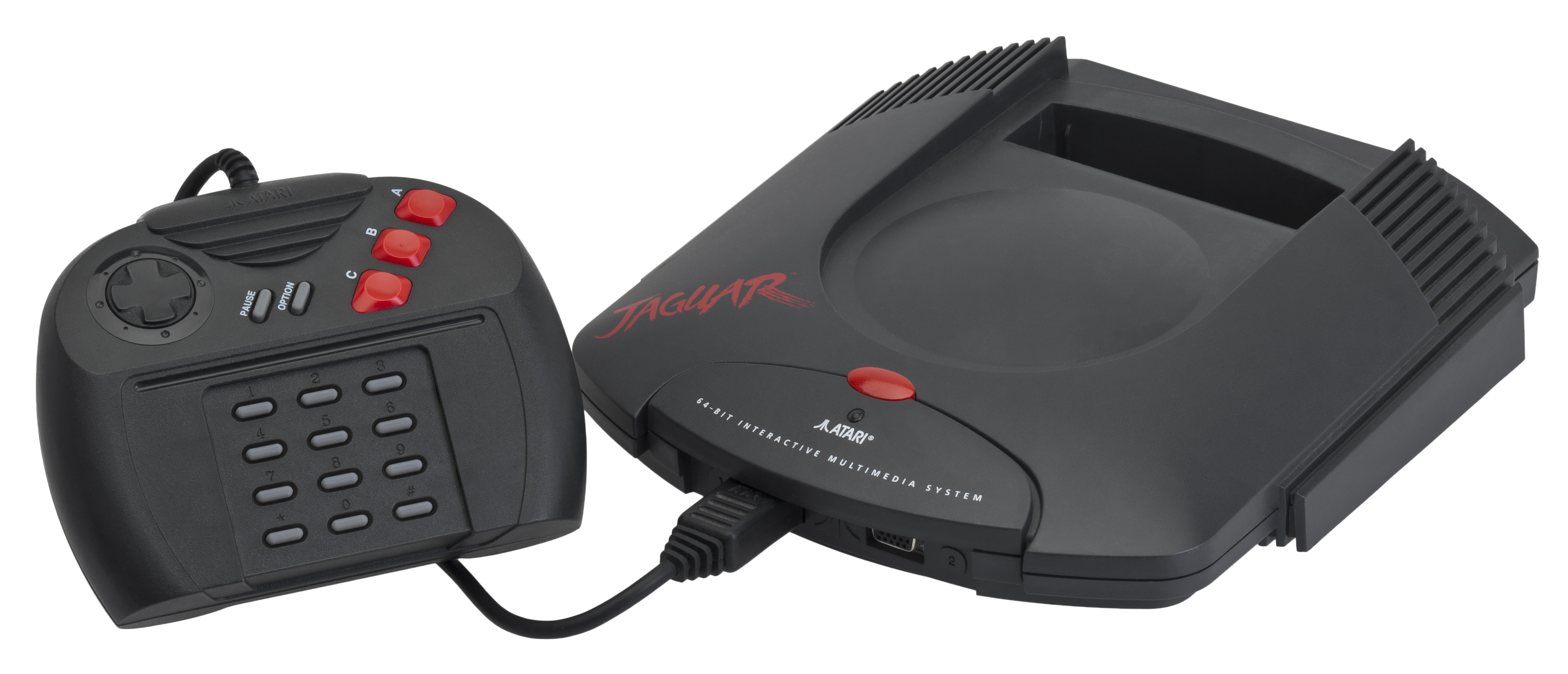
Skyhammer was announced in 1993, but was not published until 2000, after the Atari Jaguar was declared an open platform by Hasbro Interactive

The game was first announced in 1993 under the name Cyberpunk City. Further details were revealed in 1994, including the game's name change to Hammerhead and a planned release date of mid-1995, with Atari as the publisher. It was showcased at Atari's booth at E3 1995 and its release was scheduled for October 1995 under its final title, Skyhammer. In 1996, Atari laid off several employees amid an internal restructuring to focus on software publishing and rumors that they were leaving the console market, which included the departure of Tahquechi. Facing financial difficulties due to the commercial failure of the Jaguar, Atari cancelled the game's release and never paid Rebellion for having finished it. Atari dropped support for the Jaguar soon after. Telegames decided not to publish Skyhammer due to the financial risk involved in manufacturing a 4-megabyte cartridge for it.

Years later, a programmer named Carl Forhan contacted Rebellion to ask if they still had the source code for Skyhammer, as he had started looking for unreleased Jaguar games that he could license and publish. Rebellion granted Forhan the publishing rights to Skyhammer, but he had to publish the game as he received it, since the source code was not provided to him. In 1999, Forhan founded Songbird Productions to publish the game and other unreleased titles he had licensed from former Atari developers. That same year, Atari fans successfully lobbied Hasbro Interactive to release the console's patents and rights into the public domain, transforming the Jaguar into an open game development platform.

A playable demo was presented at the 1999 Classic Gaming Expo, and it was also showcased at JagFest '99, an event focused on the Jaguar. The release date for Skyhammer was initially scheduled for December 6, 1999, but was later postponed to May 8, 2000, and then to May 22, 2000. However, Songbird delayed the release date by a week due to manufacturing complications. Forhan stated that the game was the most expensive to manufacture for the Jaguar, but expressed his pride in having released it. Jason said that the Jaguar's demise caught Rebellion by surprise and lamented the console's commercial fate, but that it was great to see the game released. GamesTM proclaimed that Forhan's success in rescuing games like Skyhammer was later replicated by companies such as Good Deal Games and OlderGames, who also began searching for complete but unreleased titles.

== Reception ==
Reception

Review scores
Publication	Score
Computer and Video Games	3/5
GamesMaster	87/100
ST Format	85%
Video Games (DE)	2/5
Atari Gaming Headquarters	8/10
neXGam	8.8/10
ReVival	7/10
Ultimate Future Games	82%

According to Forhan, Skyhammer has sold well, reaching 100 copies sold in its first year. The game also received generally favorable reviews both before its cancellation and after its release.

GamesMaster's Les Ellis regarded it as a very solid 3D shooter for the Atari Jaguar, praising its astounding visuals and strategic gameplay, but noted the repetitive buildings and that the soundscapes were unexceptional. Ultimate Future Games considered it a good Jaguar game, comparing it to Descent due to the unrestricted freedom of movement in 3D, but criticized the repetitive graphics and the limited cockpit view. ST Format's Simon Forrester found the game enjoyable thanks to the number of missions and the sense of destruction experienced when eliminating enemies. Forrester also praised the graphics but felt that controlling the ship was sometimes tricky. Computer and Video Games' Tom Guise rated it an entertaining Jaguar title, commending its ambitious concept and impressive graphics for the console, but felt the action was lacking. Atari Gaming Headquarters' Keita Iida stated that "Had it been released at the time of its completion, Skyhammer would have held its own".

GameFan's Eric Mylonas opined that Skyhammer was a fun title and compared it to G-Police in visual terms, stating that the latter would have been labeled a clone if the former had appeared first. Video Games' Ralph Karels said that the game demonstrated the Jaguar's capabilities in terms of 3D graphics, but criticized its sluggish frame rate, poor audio, and imprecise controls. ReVival's Cyril Denis found the game very engaging because it did not force the player to follow a pre-determined path and had good controls. Denis also felt the soundscapes suited the action, but noted that the visuals were somewhat outdated. Author Andy Slaven commended the game's graphics, but faulted its slow controls and choppy frame rate. German website neXGam praised the game for its audiovisual presentation, controls, the large size of the cities, and its game modes, but noted that it can become a bit monotonous. Retro Gamer stated that "Skyhammer is a really impressive example of just what the Jaguar is capable of". In 2023, Time Extension listed Skyhammer as one of the best Jaguar games. In 2024, Comic Book Resources also identified it as one of the ten best games for the Jaguar.
