= Trevor McFur in the Crescent Galaxy =

1993 video game

- Cover art by Shaun Tsai
- Developer: Atari Corporation
- Publisher: Atari Corporation
- Producer: James Hampton
- Designers: Eric Ginner; James Hampton; Susan G. McBride
- Programmers: Eric Ginner; Andrew J. Burgess
- Artist: Susan G. McBride
- Composers: Alex Rudis; Michael Stevens; R. Wiley Evans
- Platform: Atari Jaguar
- Release: NA: November 23, 1993; EU: June 1994
- Genre: Horizontally scrolling shooter
- Mode: Single-player

Trevor McFur in the Crescent Galaxy is a 1993 horizontally scrolling shooter video game developed and published by Atari Corporation for the Atari Jaguar. The game stars Trevor McFur, a corporal in the Interplanetary Defense Squad's Circle Reserves chapter. The Crescent Galaxy has been conquered by an entity known as Odd-It, whose purpose is to make every living being like it. Alongside his partner Cutter piloting a shuttlecraft, McFur must free four moons of the planet Cosmolite and defeat Odd-It.

Crescent Galaxy was produced by James "Purple" Hampton, who designed it with programmer Eric Ginner and art director Susan G. McBride. The project entered development at the same time as Cybermorph. Ginner had ideas for a side-scrolling shooter while Atari wanted a mascot similar to Mario or Sonic the Hedgehog, which resulted in Trevor McFur's creation. The game was given a short deadline to meet the Jaguar's launch before other consoles were released, leading to several cut features. It was considered as the Jaguar's pack-in game until Atari chose Cybermorph instead. The game was released in North America in November 1993 and in Europe in June 1994. Mumin Corporation published it in Japan in January 1995.

Crescent Galaxy garnered a mixed reception from critics and retrospective commentators. Praise was given to the graphics but most reviewers were divided regarding its gameplay and controls, while criticism was geared towards the presentation, design, and soundscape. By 1995, the game had sold 23,829 copies. In 2022, it was included in the Atari 50 compilation.

== Gameplay ==
The player controls Trevor McFur's ship (left) and fires at approaching hazards.

Trevor McFur in the Crescent Galaxy is a horizontally scrolling shooter game starring Trevor McFur, a corporal in the Interplanetary Defense Squad's Circle Reserves chapter. The plot takes place in the Crescent Galaxy, which has been conquered by an entity known as Odd-It, whose purpose is to make every living being like it. Together with his partner Cutter, piloting a shuttlecraft, McFur must free four moons of the planet Cosmolite and defeat Odd-It.

The moons can be played in any order, each consisting of two flight stages: One through space and one over the moon's surface. In each stage, the player controls McFur's spaceship across a perpetually moving plane and encounters enemies and obstacles until reaching a boss. Upon defeating this boss, the player enters a bonus round where they can collect power-ups by passing through rings, ending the round upon crashing into one. Clearing all moons unlocks Cosmolite. There are fourteen stages in total.

The player's ship is equipped with a single-shot cannon, bombs, and nine special weapons: magnets, bouncing tracers, laser beams, screen-clearing flashes, missiles, neutralizer rings, bolt waves, protective shields, and Cutter. Cutter provides temporary assistance by shooting down enemies and obstacles. Power-ups are dropped by enemies to increase the ship's overall firepower if picked up by the player. The player may use other special weapons while Cutter is present. The player can collect "Circle Reserves" icons to receive one use of each special weapon. Getting hit by enemy fire or colliding with obstacles results in the player losing a life, as well as a penalty of decreasing the ship's firepower to its original state. The player starts with four lives, and more can be obtained by finding "McFur" icons or reaching certain score thresholds. The game is over once all lives are lost, though the player has four continues per playthrough.

== Development ==
Trevor McFur in the Crescent Galaxy was developed in-house by Atari Corporation. It was produced by James "Purple" Hampton, who designed it with programmer Eric Ginner and art director Susan G. McBride. Ginner joined Atari as a tester in 1984 and became a programmer in 1990, working with Jerome Strach on five Atari Lynx titles including Checkered Flag (1991) and Batman Returns (1992). Hampton previously worked as a tester at Lucasfilm Games before joining Atari in 1992 as a producer for several Atari Lynx titles. Andrew J. Burgess, who had worked on the arcade game S.T.U.N. Runner, provided additional programming support and created the game's audio engine. Linnea Wigren led the team of animators that also comprised B. J. West, Cheryl Blaha, Donald Wang, Michael E. Bartlett, Shaun Tsai, and Tony Gascon. West joined Atari in June 1993 as a temp-to-hire and later became a full-time employee. The music was composed by Alex "LX" Rudis, Michael Stevens, and R. Wiley Evans. Evans joined Atari in 1993 after studying music at the California Institute of the Arts (CalArts), working in audio production, but later became a full-time employee and co-developed tools for the Jaguar.

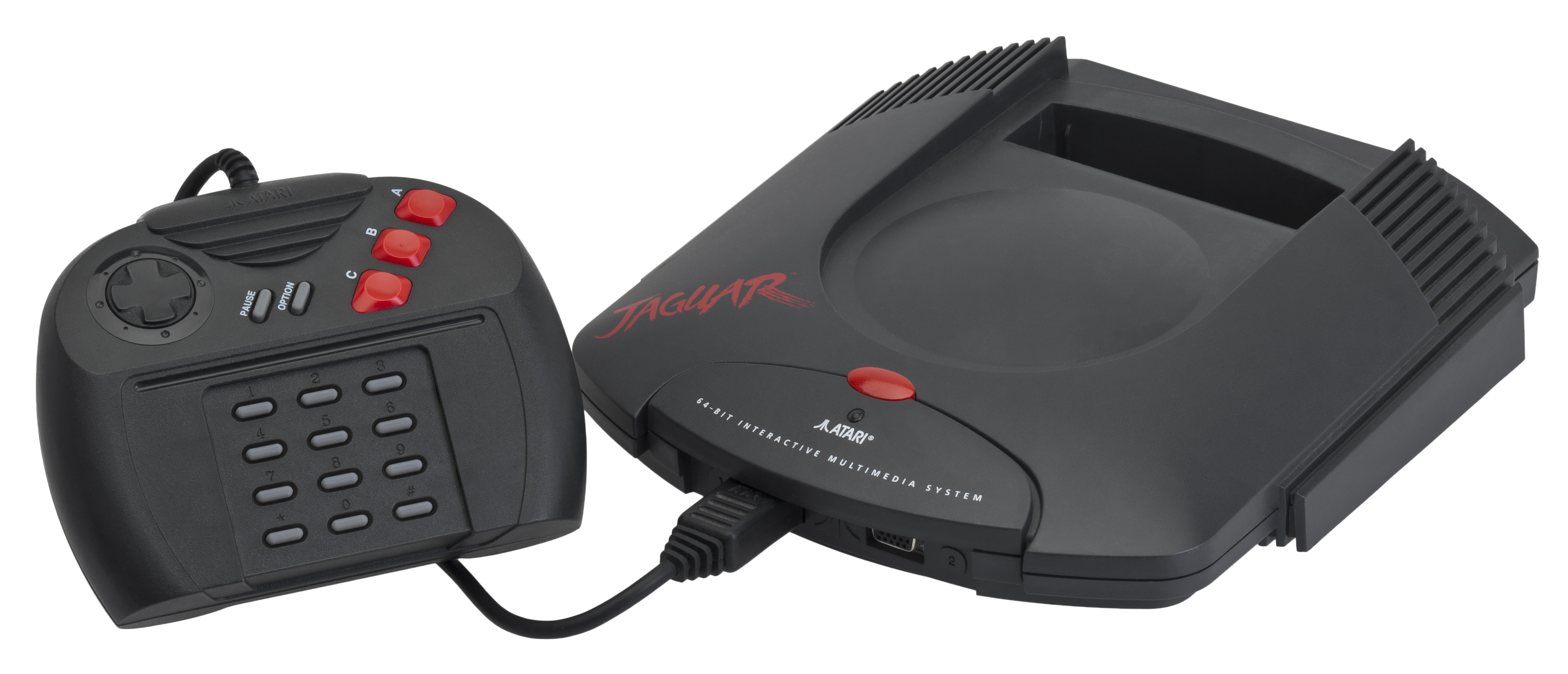
Trevor McFur in the Crescent Galaxy was given a short deadline to meet the Atari Jaguar's launch.

The project entered development under the codename Side Shooter at the same time as Cybermorph. Ginner had ideas for a shooter while Atari wanted a mascot similar to Mario or Sonic the Hedgehog, resulting in Trevor McFur's creation and the game becoming Trevor McFur in the Crescent Galaxy. Wigren stated that McBride was responsible for incorporating Trevor McFur into the game. To achieve a competitive appearance, Wigren suggested to an Atari vice president converting 3D animations into sprites, to which the vice president agreed, and Hampton worked with the animation team to convert their assets into pre-rendered sprites. Wigren created the backgrounds, while West animated some of the enemies and bosses. It was one of West's first works in the video game industry, before becoming involved in titles such as the unreleased Black ICE\White Noise for the Atari Jaguar CD and The Sims (2000). The cover art was illustrated by Tsai.

Ginner believed creating a game design document long in advance was a waste of time as most games turned out different from their initial concepts. He said preferred doing things "on the fly". Hampton was unhappy with the game's direction and wanted to implement changes to the gameplay, but Ginner refused to make them. Rudis complained to Atari staffer Leonard Tramiel that the team needed more gameplay variety for the levels, but Leonard said that side-scrollers were too dynamic to justify it. The team was given a short deadline to meet the Jaguar's launch before other consoles were released. As the release date approached, Ginner had no more control over the design and mainly polished existing content. This resulted in missing content such as secret areas and items, advanced weaponry, and more detailed gameplay elements. Ginner has since considered Crescent Galaxy as the game he is the least proud of, expressing disappointment with his faltered chance to make an original game. Burgess stated that the game was "built on an evolving platform that was hard to program, with early development features, and a highly inexperienced game development organization at the time". Hampton regretted not being able to implement the gameplay changes he wanted to make Crescent Galaxy a decent title.

== Release ==
Trevor McFur in the Crescent Galaxy was unveiled as one of the first games for Atari Jaguar at a press conference held by Atari Corporation on August 18, 1993. It was considered as the pack-in game for the Jaguar until Atari chose Cybermorph instead. Atari released the game as a launch title in North America on November 23, 1993. A European release followed in June 1994, and Mumin Corporation published the game in Japan on January 13, 1995. In Spain, it was distributed by Products Final. In 2008, the hobbyist community Jaguar Sector II released the game's source code in its Jaguar Source Code Collection. In 2022, Crescent Galaxy was included in the Atari 50 compilation for Windows, the Nintendo Switch, PlayStation 4, and Xbox One, marking its first re-release.

== Reception ==
Reception

Review scores
Publication	Score
Edge	4/10
GamesMaster	47/100
Génération 4	76%
Hyper	45%
Joypad	71%
ST Format	44%
ST Review	35%
Atari ST User	90%
The Atari Times	58%
VideoGames	6/10

Trevor McFur in the Crescent Galaxy received a mixed reception from critics. The graphics garnered unanimous praise. A writer for GameFan celebrated its high-resolution backgrounds and lack of slowdown or flicker. GamePro's Boss Music said it had generally impressive graphics. Edge saw the bosses as visually grand. Génération 4's Grégory Halliday praised the stage backgrounds and enemy variety. ST Format's Andy Nuttall gave favorable remarks to the colorful background graphics. Hyper's Andrew Humphreys wrote that "it certainly shows that the [Atari Jaguar] will be capable of displaying some very flashy images". Atari ST User's Jonathan Maddock lauded the pre-rendered sprites and screen-filling bosses. However, some reviewers bemoaned the game's limited parallax scrolling.

Most reviewers were divided regarding the gameplay and controls. GameFan found the game reminiscent of Gates of Zendocon on the Atari Lynx. They commended its power-ups, enemies, and bosses. Boss Music said it had functional controls but they panned the shallow gameplay and primitive action. Electronic Gaming Monthly's five reviewers commented that "the game is not very challenging, not to mention the controller cramps your hand". Halliday compared it to Project-X but commented that the possibility of storing special weapons gave it a major advantage. He also noted its complex controls and difficulty. Nuttall found its gameplay dull. VideoGames regarded it as an "interesting hybrid" between a shooter and an Asteroids-esque game. Nourdine noted, however, that it could quickly become boring. ST Review felt the game had less replayability than R-Type or Xenon 2: Megablast. The Atari Times writer Taz said that the gameplay was slower than that of Defender 2000.

Journalists leveled criticism at the presentation, design, and soundscape. Edge called it "one of the weediest shoot 'em ups ever produced". They criticized its poor game design, weak sound, and basic level design. Nourdine saw the lack of music during gameplay as a shortcoming. Humphreys found the game poorly designed and barely fun. Nuttall faulted its minimalistic presentation. According to internal documentation from Atari Corporation, the game had sold 23,829 copies by April 1, 1995.

Retrospective commentary for Trevor McFur in the Crescent Galaxy has been equally mixed. Brett Daly of Jaguar Front Page News (a part of the GameSpy network) found the game's graphics to be fairly impressive for its age. He felt the gameplay was alright but saw the audio as its weakest point. Author Andy Slaven called it a "dreadful" horizontal shooter, lambasting its storyline and one-hit kills. GamesRadar+ named it one of the ten "weirdest launch games of all time". Nils of the German website neXGam commended the visuals, but faulted its long and boring levels. He regarded it as "nothing more than a graphics demonstration with an unusual design".
