= Checkered Flag (1994 video game) =

- Cover art by Steve Lang
- Developer: Rebellion Developments
- Publisher: Atari Corporation
- Producer: John Skruch
- Programmer: Robert Dibley
- Artist: Justin Rae
- Composers: Alex Quarmby; James Grunke; Nathan Brenholdt; Will Davis
- Platform: Atari Jaguar
- Release: NA: November 1994; EU: December 1994
- Genre: Racing
- Mode: Single-player

Checkered Flag is a 1994 racing video game developed by Rebellion Developments and published by Atari Corporation for the Atari Jaguar. It is a conversion of the 1991 Atari Lynx title of the same name. In the game, the player controls a Formula One car competing against computer-controlled opponents in races across multiple locations. Gameplay consists of three modes, and the player can choose various weather conditions or customize the vehicle's characteristics.

Checkered Flag was announced in 1993 as one of the first games for Jaguar, being advertised as a sequel to the Atari Lynx original. Rebellion were commissioned to work on a 3D single-player driving game. The project initially started as a simulation racer, but later evolving into a more action-oriented title as a homage to Virtua Racing, being reportedly developed under a low budget.

Checkered Flag for the Jaguar garnered mixed reception from critics and retrospective commentators, most of which compared it to Virtua Racing; praise was given to the selection of tracks, weather conditions, and vehicle customization, but others expressed mixed opinions regarding the visuals and audio. Some reviewers also criticized the controls, frame rate, AI, and lack of a two-player mode. By 1995, the game had sold 20,257 copies.

== Gameplay ==
The player vehicle racing against a computer opponent (on the right) in the Green Valley course

Checkered Flag is a three-dimensional Formula One racing game, similar to the Atari Lynx title of the same name and Virtua Racing, where the main goal is to finish a race ahead of other racers controlled by the computer. During gameplay, the player can alternate between six camera views. The player can choose or customize various gameplay options before starting a race, such as the color of the vehicle, weather condition, airfoil setting, types of tires, gear transmission, number of opponents, lap count, and which track to compete on. By entering a cheat code at the options menu, players have access to a night weather condition.

There are three different modes of play to choose from at the options screen: Single Race, Free Practice and Tournament. Single Race is a race mode where players compete against computer-controlled opponents on any track and complete a number of laps. Free Practice is a time trial mode, where players race against the clock to achieve the best time possible and practice their driving skills. Tournament is a season mode where players compete against five opponents to reach the first place across ten different tracks. There are no multiplayer modes.

== Development ==
Checkered Flag for the Atari Jaguar is a conversion of the 1991 Atari Lynx title of the same name. The game was created by Rebellion Developments, an Oxford-based game developer founded in 1992 by brothers Jason and Chris Kingsley. Its foundation was laid when the brothers secured a deal with Atari Corporation; Rebellion presented a demo for Atari Falcon, which depicted flying dragons against longships to the publisher's directors, whom sought games for the Jaguar. They were commissioned to work on Checkered Flag and Alien vs Predator after being impressed with their previous release, Eye of the Storm (1993) for PC.

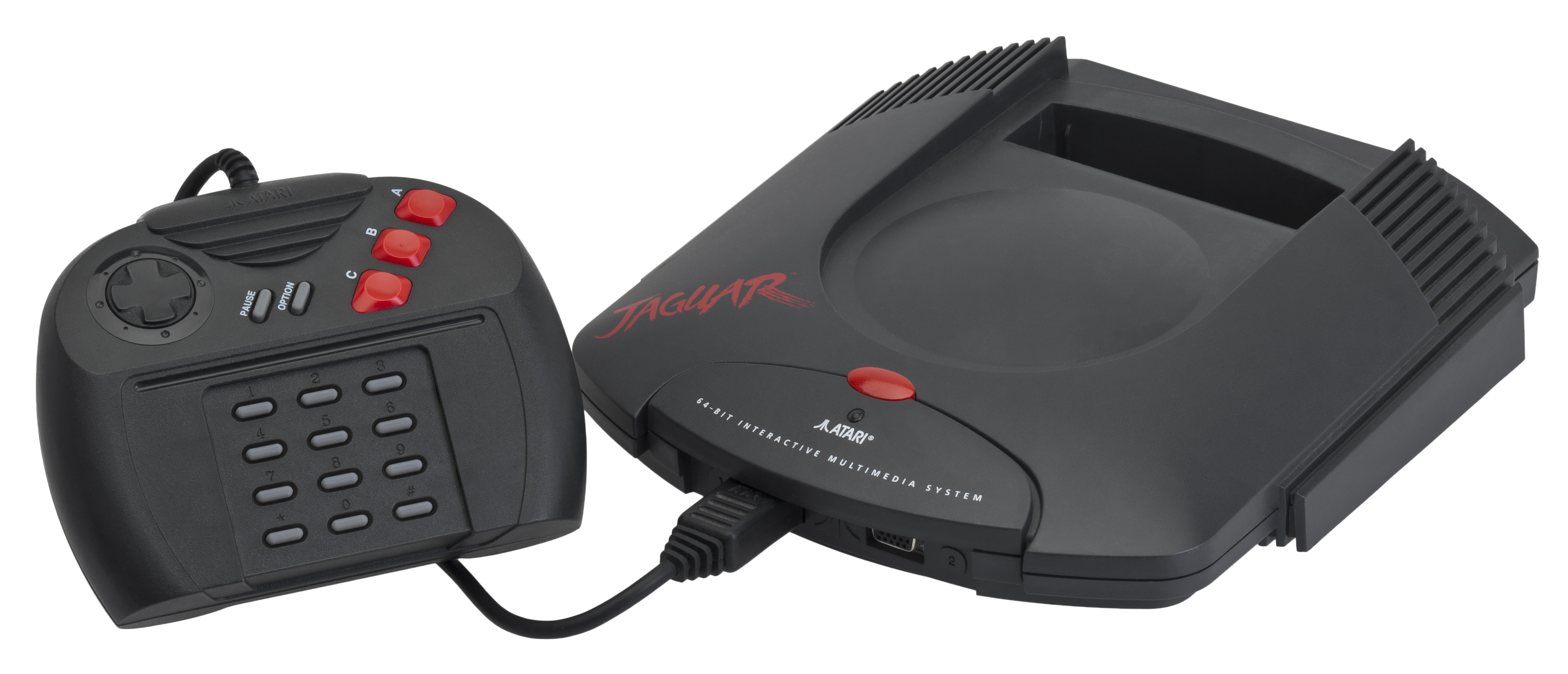
Checkered Flag was announced as one of the first Atari Jaguar titles, and went through various name changes prior to launch.

It was produced by John Skruch, with Jason Kingsley serving as coordinator. Robert "Rob" Dibley acted as the game's programmer, while artist Justin Rae was responsible for the graphics. The music was composed by Alex Quarmby, James Grunke, Nathan Brenholdt, and Will Davis. Rebellion first began the project as a simulation racer but later evolved into a more action-oriented title. Jason Kingsley described it as a homage to Virtua Racing, and stated that the lack of a two-player mode was due to Atari's commission to create a 3D single-player driving game. GamePro writer Manny LaMancha reportedly pointed out that the game was developed under a low budget. The cover art was illustrated by Steve Lang. Jason Kingsley has since retrospectively commented that the Jaguar was not up to the task of handling polygons. He felt the team did their best and that they achieved a good, though not exceptional, title.

== Release ==
The game was announced in 1993 as one of the first games for Atari Jaguar under the name Jaguar Formula One Racing. It was advertised as a sequel to the Atari Lynx title of the same name, planning for a first quarter 1994 release date under the title Checkered Flag II. The game was first revealed at the 1994 Winter Consumer Electronics Show. The name was changed to Redline Racing before being renamed under its final title, Checkered Flag. It made appearances at other events such as the 1994 Summer CES, the 1994 ECTS Autumn, and the London Planetarium. The game was first published in North America in November 1994, and later in Europe in December. It was distributed in Japan by retailer Messe Sanoh. In 2008, the hobbyist community Jaguar Sector II released the game's source code in its Jaguar Source Code Collection.

== Reception ==
Reception

Review scores
Publication	Score
Consoles +	93%
Computer and Video Games	72/100
Game Informer	4/10
Joypad	72%
M! Games	56%
Mega Fun	32%
Next Generation	2/5
Player One	55%
Video Games (DE)	58%
Atari Explorer Online	2.5/5
Digital Press	2/10
Games World	87/100
Jaguar	80%
Play Time	32%
ST-Computer	50%
ST Magazine	62/100
ST Review	70%
STart Micro	3/10
Última Generación	30/100
Ultimate Future Games	55%
Top Secret	5/5
VideoGames	6/10

Checkered Flag for the Atari Jaguar received mixed reception from critics, most of which compared it to Virtua Racing. (Note: Attributed to multiple references: Atari Gaming Headquarters, Consoles +, ST Review, STart Micro, and Game Informer.) Internal documentation from Atari Corporation showed that the game had sold 20,257 copies by April 1, 1995. Computer and Video Games' Edward Lawrence and Mark Patterson stated that the game was quite technically accomplished, but criticized the jerky frame rate and sluggish handling of the vehicle. They also saw the lack of a two-player mode as a major oversight. GameFan's Dave Halverson and Nicholas Dean Des Barres commended the game's colorful smooth-shaded polygonal graphics and music, but faulted its touchy controls, absurd AI, and frustrating gameplay.

Joypad's Nini Nourdine gave positive remarks to the visuals, numerous circuits, and weather conditions, but the low number of opponents on the track, execrable handling of the vehicle, technical bugs, and lack of a two-player mode were criticized. Games World's four reviewers praised Checkered Flag on the Jaguar for its slick polygonal visuals and customizable vehicles. One of the four reviewers favored it over Virtua Racing for being more faster and having more tracks. Mega Fun's Martin Weidner noted the game's fast graphics but lambasted its imprecise controls. Player One's Christophe Pottier pointed out the steering controls as a gameplay issue and criticized the game's choppy frame rate. Ultimate Future Games commended the game's variety of courses and viewpoints, but saw the bland visuals, sound effects, and gameplay as shortcomings.

MAN!AC's Robert Bannert highlighted the game's variety of options, but felt that the driving experience and graphics were below those of Virtua Racing. Next Generation highlighted the selection of tracks, weather conditions, and vehicle customization, but they expressed that the game's blend of "celerity without control ensures many hours of frustrating gameplay". Marc Abramson of the French ST Magazine commended the Gouraud-shaded visuals, but found the vehicle difficult to control. VideoGames gave positive remarks to the game's soundscape, distinct tracks, and multiple viewpoints. Conversely, they faulted its graphics, awkward playability, poor frame rate, and lack of multiplayer mode. GamePro's Sarah Nade singled-out the lack of a two-player mode as the game's biggest flaw, and Play Time's Stephan Girlich panned its imprecise controls.

An editor of German publication ST-Computer gave the game's visuals positive remarks for their variety and depictions of the different weather conditions, but criticized its audio department, gameplay, controls, and unfair AI. Video Games' Hartmut Ulrich lambased the gameplay for its sensitive controls, and opined that Virtua Racing Deluxe on 32X looked better than Checkered Flag on the Jaguar. Última Generación's José Luis Sanz commended the game's colorful scenery, but faulted its rampant slowdown and abrupt controls. Writing for the German magazine Jaguar, Daniel Jaeckel commended the game's fun factor, while Digital Press' Edward Villalpando criticized the audiovisual presentation and controls. Bromba of Polish publication Top Secret gave it a perfect rating and regarded it as the best racing game for the Jaguar.

=== Retrospective coverage ===
Retrospective commentary for Checkered Flag on the Jaguar has been equally mixed. The Atari Times' Gregory D. George felt the game's visuals were better than Virtua Racing, but panned its controls. Brett Daly of Jaguar Front Page News (a part of the GameSpy network) lauded the game's polygon graphics and audio, but criticized its touchy gameplay and lack of a save feature during tournament mode. Author Andy Slaven commended the game's polygonal models and backgrounds, but wrote that the controls were a "complete wreck". Nils of the German website neXGam found the game's visuals to be endearing but noted the lack of a two-player mode, and faulted its annoying controls and AI.
