= Batman Returns (Atari Lynx video game) =

1992 video game

- Developer: Atari Corporation
- Publisher: Atari Corporation
- Producer: John Skruch
- Programmers: Eric Ginner; Jerome Strach
- Artists: Eric Blumrich; Eric Elliot; Melody Rondeau
- Composers: Alex Rudis (uncredited); Robert Vieira
- Series: Batman
- Platform: Atari Lynx
- Release: NA: June 19, 1992; EU: 1992
- Genre: Action-beat 'em up
- Mode: Single-player

Batman Returns is a 1992 side-scrolling action-beat 'em up video game developed and published by Atari Corporation in North America and Europe for the Atari Lynx. Based on the DC Comics superhero Batman, it is inspired by the Warner Bros.'s 1992 film of the same name. In the main storyline, Batman must confront both Catwoman and the Penguin.

Headed by Checkered Flag producer John Skruch, Batman Returns on the Atari Lynx was created by most of the same team that previously worked on several projects at Atari Corp. for their platform. The team undertook the Lynx version in 1991 but a tight development cycle and multiple issues were faced during the creation process before its eventual launch to the market, which were attributed to the film's production schedule. The game was met with mixed reception from critics; common complaints were towards the high level of difficulty, steep learning curve and repetitive gameplay, although it was praised for its presentation, detailed graphics and sound design. The title later became a pack-in game for the Lynx II in certain regions.

== Gameplay ==
Gameplay screenshot.

Batman Returns on the Atari Lynx is a side-scrolling action-beat 'em up game where players take control of Batman through four increasingly difficult stages fighting against multiple adversaries such as the Red Triangle Gang in order to stop both Catwoman and the Penguin from spreading terror across Gotham City as the main objective. In the first stage, Batman must face off the Red Triangle Gang with Penguin as the end level boss. The second stage pits Batman against the police on the rooftops with Catwoman as the end level boss. The third stage is about defeating Penguin's forces in the sewers, while the Penguin is fought for the last time in the fourth stage. Along the way, Batman can grab a variety of items to aid him on his journey against enemies such as batarangs and bat-shaped health pickups.

== Development and release ==
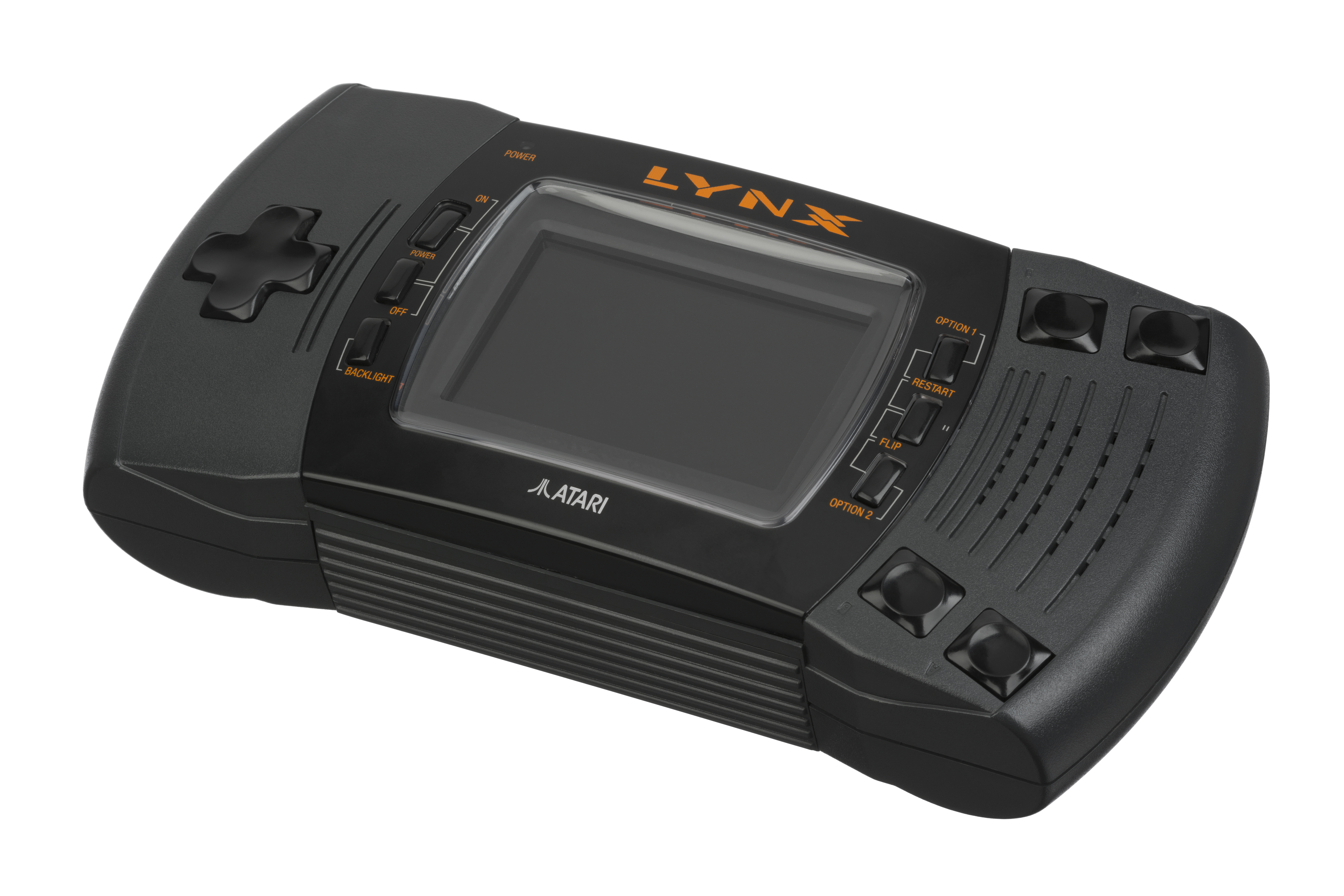
Batman Returns for the Atari Lynx went through a turbulent development cycle before launch to coincide with the film's premiere. It later became a pack-in game for the Lynx II.

Batman Returns on the Atari Lynx was created by most of the same staff that worked on previous projects at Atari for their platform such as Checkered Flag, Klax and Warbirds, among others. Its development was supervised by producer John Skruch, with both Eric Ginner and Jerome Strach acting as co-programmers. The visual art team was led by Susan G. McBride, who also worked as animator alongside artists Eric Blumrich, Eric "Coyote" Elliott, Melody Rondeau, Philip Temple and Robb Mariani. Mariani came from Atari's Chicago division, while both Blumrich and Temple were brought as contractors. The audio was handled by composers Robert "Bob" Vieira and Alex "LX" Rudis, although the latter is not named as such in the credits of the game. Skruch recounted the game's creation process and history through publications.

Skruch said that Atari undertook the project in September 1991 but due to the movie's tight production schedule, the team did not receive a preliminary synopsis of the plot until November of the same year. Conceptualization began at that point until other original production materials such as stills and a shooting script arrived in January 1992, when the development team was prepared to start programming work, although members of the staff worked on the Lynx conversion of Rampart during their leisure early in the development cycle. Skruch said that several issues were faced during development like approval from actors of publicity stills with appearance of their likeness before their distribution, as well as redesigning certain aspects in the game to be more in line with the final movie version due to constant changes during the filming process.

When designing the game, Skruch and the team wanted to convey major scenes of the film in an action game format, while gameplay was made to resemble the Lynx version of Rygar. The team also ensured that the portrayal of Batman's sprite was accurate to the film as well. Due to opting in having the game complete to coincide with the movie's release, members of the staff worked overtime over the course of several months during development. Despite these setbacks, Skruch claimed that work on the project proved to be "totally exhilarating". Batman Returns for the Atari Lynx was released in June 1992 to coincide with its eponymous film's premiere. The game was showcased during the 1992 Taste of Chicago food festival along with other Lynx titles such as Hydra. The title later became a pack-in game for the Lynx II in certain regions.

== Reception ==
Reception

Review scores
Publication	Score
AllGame	2.5/5
Aktueller Software Markt	9/12
Consoles +	46%
HobbyConsolas	89/100
IGN	8.0/10
Joypad	93%
Joystick	93%
Micromanía	49/60
Player One	55%
ST Format	77%
Superjuegos	77,2/100
Video Games (DE)	38%
Zero	70/100
Play Time	55%
Power Play	52%

Batman Returns on the Atari Lynx was released to a mixed reception. Aktueller Software Markt's Marcus Höfer and Michael Anton praised the eerie landscapes and gameplay but noted its difficulty and criticized the music for sounding like "an open pair of trousers in the wind". In contrast, AllGame's Colin Williamson heavily criticized the mediocre gameplay, lousy graphics, atrocious level design and poor sound design, stating that "if you want to keep your sanity, stay far, far away from the Lynx version of Batman Returns". Consoles +'s Axel and Robby commended its animated visuals, sound and playability but criticized the presentation and longevity, regarding it to be an overall disappointment. GamePro's Sister Sinister praised the Lynx version's graphics as "exceptionally good considering the small venue" and felt that the game's high difficulty compensated for its short length, although noted that while the audio "ranks high on the rockability scale", it became monotonous after a few hours.

Hobby Consolas' Juan Carlos García and Superjuegos' Javier Iturrioz gave positive remarks to the audiovisual presentation but both criticized the excessive difficulty level, stating that it renders the game unplayable due to the lack of extra lives and continues. IGN's Robert A. Jung described the Lynx version as "respectable" and commended the game's visuals, animations and difficulty. Joypad's Alain Huyghues-Lacour and Joystick's Nourdine Nini highly praised the graphics, animations, sound and controls but noted its high difficulty curve. Micromanía's F.D.L. commended the graphics for being outstanding and sound design as astonishing, as well as its controls and atmosphere but criticized the unbalanced difficulty.

Player One's Cyril Drevet gave positive remarks to the admirable visual presentation but regarded it as boring to control. ST Format's Andy Hutchinson positively addressed the graphical aspect but noted the game's difficulty, recommending it to players thriving for challenge. Video Games' Jan Barysch claimed that the Game Boy iteration of Batman: The Video Game was better than Batman Returns on Lynx, criticizing the character animations, controls and unfair enemies. Barysch also panned the poor controls but commended the visual aspect. Zero's David Wilson praised the graphics but criticized the lack of additional moves. Contrasting most reviewers, Play Time's Thorsten Szameitat criticized the lack of additional options to fight against enemies, which rendered the game very easy.
