= Thea Realm Fighters =

- Promotional E3 1995 flyer
- Developer: High Voltage Software
- Publisher: Atari Corporation
- Platforms: Atari Jaguar; Atari Jaguar CD
- Release: Unreleased
- Genre: Fighting
- Modes: Single-player, multiplayer

Thea Realm Fighters (TRF) is an unreleased fighting game that was in development by High Voltage Software and planned to be published by Atari Corporation on a scheduled October 1995 release date exclusively for both the Atari Jaguar and the Atari Jaguar CD add-on.

The player takes the role from any of the playable characters to defeat other characters before SurRaider, a powerful warrior from another dimension, attempts to conquer Earth and add it to their vast empire. Originally announced in January 1995, Thea Realm Fighters was one of the many fighting games developed in response to Mortal Kombat and the series' popularity during the 1990s, featuring digitized graphics and characters, with some of them portrayed by known martial artists from the Mortal Kombat series and even the plot bears striking resemblance to Mortal Kombat II.

After several delays and expenses, Atari Corporation cancelled the game in January 1996, a decision that was seen by the video game press as an indication that the company was preparing to drop support of the Jaguar, particularly as one of the other games, Black ICE\White Noise, was also cancelled at the same time. The game was close to completion before it was cancelled, according to one of the game's programmers. Although never released, various playable prototypes of the game have been showcased at multiple Jaguar-dedicated festivals such as the JagFest 2K1. In 2016 and 2017, several ROMs were leaked online by video game collector Nicolas Persjin.

== Gameplay ==
Gameplay screenshot from one of the released beta builds.

Thea Realm Fighters is a two-dimensional fighting game with digitized characters and graphics, featuring more than twenty-five playable characters, each one with four special moves and two finisher moves, four different gameplay modes with over 30 stages. In the single-player mode, the player has to defeat twelve CPU-controlled opponents and after doing so the player was going to face SurRaider, a powerful warrior from another dimension.

The game was going to feature over 25 fighters to play against, including twelve starting fighters, 12 special fighters, various hidden sub-bosses, the final boss and five hidden fighters. Characters known from the available screenshots online and press coverage include:

== Development ==
The game was unveiled during the January WCES 1995, where the game was reported to be unpolished and too early to judge, with spectacular backgrounds and lackluster character animation. Only four characters were available at that time, with only one featuring special moves. The game was also known internally as SurRaider's Galactic Challenge. It was also playable at E3 1995, with several more characters and stages available. In a Slashdot post, a former programmer of the project stated that the game was 90% close to completion, before Atari Corporation cancelled it alongside other upcoming Jaguar projects in 1996.

At least four martial artists were known to be involved in the development of the game. There were also other 20 martial artists involved in the game as well. Some of them are:

- Ho-Sung Pak, who played Liu Kang and Shang Tsung in the Mortal Kombat series (he also served as technical advisor for the choreography of the game)
- Philip Ahn M.D., who previously played Shang Tsung in Mortal Kombat II
- Katalin Zamiar, who previously played Kitana, Mileena and Jade in Mortal Kombat II
- Daniel Pesina, who played Johnny Cage and the ninjas in the Mortal Kombat series
