= European Computer Trade Show =

1988–2004 European video game trade show

- Status: No longer active
- Frequency: Annually
- Location: London
- Inaugurated: April 16, 1988; 38 years ago
- Most recent: September 1, 2004

The European Computer Trade Show (ECTS) was an annual trade show for the European video game industry which first ran in 1988, the final event being held in 2004.

The exposition was only open to industry professionals and journalists, although it was frequently attended by members of the public who had faked credentials. Due to the wide-scale nature of this problem, many exhibitors planned stalls which appealed to both trade and public, except when alternative public shows were planned such as the Future Entertainment Show and Game Stars Live.

ECTS was always held at a London venue, usually between the end of August and the beginning of September. Its original home was the Business Design Centre in Islington. In 1995 it was relocated to the Grand Hall at Olympia in Kensington. The 2001 event took place at the ExCeL Exhibition Centre in Newham and the last three, to 2004, were at the Earls Court Exhibition Centre.

From 2001 until 2004, the Game Developers Conference Europe was held alongside ECTS. Unlike the primarily press-oriented ECTS, GDCE focused on talks and discussions about the development of games, and was aimed at the developers themselves. In 2004, however, GDCE moved locations and ran alongside the Game Stars Live event. In April 2005, organiser CMP announced that they had withdrawn from the British trade show market, marking the end of seventeen years of shows.

== Venues ==
Year	Dates	Venue
1989	16–18 April	Business Design Centre
1990	1–3 April	Business Design Centre
1991	14–16 April	Business Design Centre
1992	12–14 April	Business Design Centre
	6–8 September	Business Design Centre
1993	4–6 April	Business Design Centre
	5–7 September	Business Design Centre
1994	10–12 April	Business Design Centre
	4–6 September	Business Design Centre
1995	26–28 March	Olympia
	10–12 September	Olympia
1996	14–16 April	Olympia
	8–10 September	Olympia
1997	7–9 September	Olympia
1998	6–8 September	Olympia
1999	5–7 September	Olympia
2000	3–5 September	Olympia
2001	2–4 September	ExCeL
2002	29–31 August	Earls Court Exhibition Centre
2003	27–29 August	Earls Court Exhibition Centre
2004	1–3 September	Earls Court Exhibition Centre
