= ST Review =

British computer magazine

- March 1993 cover
- Categories: computer magazine
- Publisher: EMAP
- First issue: May 1992
- Final issue: January 1995
- Country: United Kingdom
- Language: English

ST Review was a computer magazine in the United Kingdom covering the Atari ST during the early to mid 1990s. Published by EMAP and launched in May 1992 and placed at the "serious end" of the market, it catered to ST users who wished to use their ST for a variety of productive uses, such as its MIDI capabilities, programming or word processing, as opposed to casual gaming. The title was sold to Europress after EMAP decided to close it due to lower-than-expected sales and it ran for another two years with freelance Editor Vic Lennard, full-time Deputy Editor Tony Kaye, and a full-time designer. This three-person team, along with freelance contributors, kept the magazine popular for almost two years before it finally succumbed to falling sales and the lack of success of Atari's Falcon, the expected replacement of the ST. This was due in part to the increasing PC market.

The magazine was eventually sold to Future Publishing, producers of rival ST Format. The last issue was published in January 1995.

Like many similar magazines, it contained sections of news, game reviews, previews, tips, help guides, columnists, reader's letters, and cover-mounted disks of software.
