= Checkered Flag (1991 video game) =

1991 video game

- Developer: Atari Corporation
- Publisher: Atari Corporation
- Producer: John Skruch
- Programmers: Eric Ginner; Jerome Strach
- Artists: Eric Elliot; Melody Rondeau; Susan G. McBride
- Composer: Bob Vieira
- Platform: Atari Lynx
- Release: 1991
- Genre: Racing
- Modes: Single-player, multiplayer

Checkered Flag is a 1991 racing video game developed and published by Atari Corporation for the Atari Lynx. A remake was released for the Jaguar in 1994. Destination Software planned to release a Game Boy Advance version around 2005, but it was cancelled.

== Gameplay ==
Gameplay screenshot

In Checkered Flag, the player can choose a variety of options before beginning a race. They can choose to participate in a practice session, single race or 8-race tournament. They can also select the number of laps for each race from between 1 and 50, though only in increments of 10 between 10 and 50, and the number of computer-controlled "drone" racers that will also be participating in the race. There can be up to 10 racers in total, including computer-controlled drones and player-controlled drivers. If the player chooses to play an 8-race tournament, the settings chosen apply to all races in the series.

Races in Checkered Flag can be run with an optional qualifying lap, or with the player's starting position randomised. Once the race begins, the player must see it through to its conclusion, even if all the other drivers finish before them. There is no countdown timer or checkpointing system. The player's car can be fitted with an automatic, 4-speed manual or 7-speed gearbox, chosen before the race or tournament starts.

Checkered Flag uses a simulated 3D effect with converging lines representing the road, a scrolling backdrop to create the illusion of turning, and scaling sprites to represent the trackside objects and cars on the track. The gameplay is not truly three-dimensional, as steering simply causes the car to move from side to side, and corners push the car towards their outside edge if approached too quickly. Crashing into a trackside object causes the car to immediately come to a stop, while hitting an opposing car causes both the player and the opponent to spin out, losing a significant amount of speed.

At the conclusion of a race, a victory sequence is shown, with the winning driver shown receiving a kiss from a swimsuit-clad woman or a musclebound man. The player can choose their preference (assumed to be heterosexual) by selecting their gender from the pre-race options menu. If the player has chosen to participate in an 8-race tournament, the current standings of the tournament are then shown and the next race in the series begins, otherwise the game returns to its options menu. At the conclusion of a tournament, the winning driver's car is shown driving back and forth in front of the final standings with either the swimsuit-clad woman or the musclebound man posing atop it.

The original release of Checkered Flag can be played solo or with up to 6 human players using the Lynx's proprietary ComLynx communication cables to connect multiple handhelds together. Subsequent rereleases of the game have omitted the multiplayer function.

== Development and release ==
Checkered Flag was released in 1991, created and published by Atari Corporation. It was a pack-in game with the system in the Australian and European markets at some point in the system's life. The game can support up to six players.

The game was released for Evercade as part of the Atari Lynx Collection 2 cartridge on November 6, 2020. An emulated version of the game was released by Atari and Pixel Games UK for Windows PC via Steam on November 3, 2022.

== Reception ==
Reception

Review scores
Publication	Score
AllGame	4/5
GamePro	25 / 25
IGN	10 / 10
Aktueller Software Markt	10 / 12
Consoles +	45%
Game Zero Magazine	68 / 100
Games-X	4/5
Génération 4	92%
Hobby Consolas	91 / 100
Joystick	90%
Micromanía	47 / 60
Micro News	19 / 20
Play Time	72%
Power Play	70%
Raze	86%
Superjuegos	69 / 100
Video Games	74%
VideoGames & Computer Entertainment	8 / 10

Award
Publication	Award
Entertainment Weekly (1991)	#7 Greatest Game

IGN's Robert A. Jung gave Checkered Flag an extremely positive review, citing it as a "masterpiece" and giving it a 10 out of 10, praised the game for its tight controls, map designs and variety and good camera angle. In Raze's final issue published in October 1991, their Atari Attack segment also looked at Checkered Flag, giving a score of 86%. Conversely, French magazine Consoles + gave a score of 45%, criticizing the difficulty in getting back to the race after being spun from striking a car, as well as the minimal effect upon contacting obstacles.

Entertainment Weekly picked the game as the #7 greatest game available in 1991, saying: "This all-frills racing game (side-and rearview mirrors, manual and automatic transmissions, a digitized voice that booms 'Gentlemen, start your engines') makes the grade for its ability to accommodate up to six players at a time, provided that each brings along his or her own hand-held Lynx equipment."
