= Jason Kingsley (businessman) =

British businessman

Jason Kingsley CBE
- Born: Jonathon Jason Kingsley; 1964 (age 61–62); Osgathorpe, England
- Education: St John's College, Oxford
- Occupation: Executive
- Known for: CEO of video game developer Rebellion

Jonathon Jason Kingsley CBE (born December 1964) is a British businessman. He is the co-founder and CEO of video game developer Rebellion Developments.

== Biography ==
Kingsley was born in Osgathorpe, Leicestershire; his father was a doctor, and his mother was a teacher. He attended Loughborough Grammar School and then Wyggeston and Queen Elizabeth I College. He read zoology at St John's College, Oxford, where he also played polo.

Kingsley established the company Rebellion Developments in 1992 with his brother Chris. Kingsley is also the chairman of The Independent Game Developers' Association (TIGA).

In 2017, Kingsley launched a medieval history YouTube channel called Modern History TV, of which he is the creator, producer, writer, and presenter, along with his brother Chris Kingsley, senior producer Brian Jenkins, and production partner Kasumi Kitano, under the banner of Rebellion Productions.

He and his brother were appointed Officer of the Order of the British Empire (OBE) in the 2012 Birthday Honours for services to the economy and Commander of the Order of the British Empire (CBE) in the 2024 New Year Honours for services to the creative industries.
