= List of Acorn Electron games =

Following is a list of commercial Acorn Electron, BBC Micro and BBC Master games, with original publishers.

== Acorn Electron ==
There are 726 commercial games on this list, of which 402 are compatible with Acorn Electron only and 324 are also compatible with the BBC Micro.

Name	Release Date	Publisher	Stated Compatibility
10 Educational Games	1984	Dimax Structured Software	Acorn Electron
3D Bomb Alley	1984	Software Invasion	Acorn Electron
3D Dotty	1988	Blue Ribbon	BBC/Electron
3D Maze	1983	Ijk	Acorn Electron
3D Pool	1989	Firebird	BBC/Electron
3D Tank Zone	1984	Dynabyte	Acorn Electron
737 Flight Simulator	1984	Salamander	Acorn Electron
747 Flight Simulator (DACC)	1985	Dacc	Acorn Electron
747 Flight Simulator (Doctorsoft)	1983	Doctorsoft	Acorn Electron
767 Flight Simulator	1984	Flightdeck	BBC/Electron
A Question of Sport	1989	Superior/Acornsoft	Acorn Electron
Aabatron	1985	Bevan Technology	BBC/Electron
Abyss	1984	Cases Computer Simulations	BBC/Electron
Aces High	1985	Oasis	BBC/Electron
Acheton	1990	Topologika	Acorn Electron
Adventure	1984	Micro Power	Acorn Electron
Adventure 4 Pack	1987	Potter Programs	BBC/Electron
Adventure Anthology	1987	Database Publications	Acorn Electron
Adventure Quiz	1984	Dial	Acorn Electron
Adventureland	1986	Adventure International	Acorn Electron
Adventurous English	1986	Highlight	BBC/Electron
Airbrush	1982	Soft Hits	Spectrum 16K/48K/BBC A/BBC B/Electron
Airline	1984	Cases Computer Simulations	Acorn Electron
Alien Break-In	1984	Romik	Acorn Electron
Alien Dropout	1984	Superior	Acorn Electron
Alphabet Fun		Gemini	Acorn Electron
Alps	1989	Alpine	Acorn Electron
American Suds	1988	Riverdale	BBC/Electron
Anarchy Zone	1988	Atlantis	BBC/Electron
Annabel Gray	1984	Lee Software	BBC/Electron
Answer Back Junior Quiz	1984	Kosmos	BBC Master Compact/Electron
Answer Back Senior Quiz	1984	Kosmos	BBC Master Compact/Electron
Answer Back Sport	1984	Kosmos	BBC Master Compact/Electron
Arcade 4 Pack	1984	Potter Programs	BBC/Electron
Arcade Soccer	1989	The 4th Dimension	BBC/Electron
Arcadians	1983	Acornsoft	Acorn Electron
Area Radar Controller		Software For All	BBC/Electron
Arena 3000	1984	Microdeal	Acorn Electron
Around The World In 40 Screens	1987	Superior/Acornsoft	Acorn Electron
Arrow Of Death Part 1	1983	Channel 8	Acorn Electron
Arrow Of Death Part 2	1983	Channel 8	Acorn Electron
Astro Plumber	1986	Blue Ribbon	Acorn Electron
Atom Smasher	1984	Romik	Acorn Electron
Avon & Murdac	1989	Topologika	Acorn Electron
Ballistix	1989	Superior/Acornsoft	Acorn Electron
Balloon Buster	1989	Blue Ribbon	BBC/Electron
Bandits At 3 O' Clock	1984	Micro Power	Acorn Electron
Bar Billiards	1988	Blue Ribbon	BBC/Electron
Barbarian	1988	Superior/Acornsoft	Acorn Electron
Barbarian II: The Dungeon of Drax	1989	Superior/Acornsoft	Acorn Electron
Battle 1917	1984	Cases Computer Simulations	BBC/Electron
Battlefields	1986	BBCSoft/BBC Publications	BBC/Electron
Battlezone 2000	1984	Lothlorien	BBC/Electron
Battlezone Six	1987	Kansas City Systems	Acorn Electron
BBC Mastermind	1985	Mirrorsoft	BBC/Electron
BBC Mastermind Quizmaster	1985	Mirrorsoft	BBC/Electron
Beach-Head	1985	U. S. Gold	BBC/Electron
Bed Bugs	1984	Optima	Acorn Electron
Beebtrek	1984	Software For All	BBC/Electron
Birdie Barrage (aka Golf)	1985	CDS Microsystems/Blue Ribbon	Acorn Electron
Birds Of Prey	1984	Romik	Acorn Electron
Birdstrike	1984	Firebird	Acorn Electron
Blagger	1984	Alligata	Acorn Electron
Blast!	1990	Audiogenic	BBC/Electron
Blitzkrieg	1985	Software Invasion	Acorn Electron
Blockbusters (aka Ateb ac Atal)	1986	Macsen	BBC/Electron
Blockbusters Gold Run	1986	Macsen	BBC/Electron
Blood Of The Mutineers	1989	Robico	Acorn Electron
Blue Dragon	1984	MP	Acorn Electron
Blue Ribbon Games Disk 1 (Screwball)	1986	Blue Ribbon	Acorn Electron
Bobby Charlton Soccer	1984	Dacc	Acorn Electron
Boffin	1985	Addictive Games	BBC/Electron
Bomber Baron	1987	Optyx	BBC/Electron
Bonecruncher	1988	Superior/Acornsoft	Acorn Electron
Boxer	1983	Acornsoft	Acorn Electron
Brain Teasers	1983	Dynabyte	Acorn Electron
Breakthrough	1988	Audiogenic	BBC/Electron
Brian Clough's Football Fortunes	1987	CDS Microsystems	BBC/Electron
Brian Jacks Superstar Challenge	1985	Martech	BBC/Electron
Bridge Challenge	1985	Livewire	BBC/Electron
Bridgemaster (J. Keyne)	1984	J. Keyne	Acorn Electron
Bridgemaster (Potter Programs)	1984	Potter Programs	BBC/Electron
Buffalo Bill'S Rodeo Games	1989	Micro Value	BBC/Electron
Bug Blaster	1984	Alligata	Acorn Electron
Bug Eyes	1985	Icon	Acorn Electron
Bug Eyes 2	1986	Audiogenic	BBC/Electron
Bugs	1984	Virgin Games	Acorn Electron
Bullseye	1986	Macsen	BBC/Electron
Bumble Bee	1985	Micro Power	Acorn Electron
Bumper Bundle (Crown Jewels / Hell Hole)	1985	Alligata	Acorn Electron
Bun Fun	1983	Squirrel	Acorn Electron
Business Games	1983	Acornsoft	Acorn Electron
By Fair Means or Foul	1988	Superior/Acornsoft	Acorn Electron
Camelot	1991	Superior/Blue Ribbon	BBC/Electron
Cash Care	1984	Squirrel	Acorn Electron
Cassette 50	1984	Cascade	Acorn Electron
Castle Assault	1985	Blue Ribbon	Acorn Electron
Castle Frankenstein	1984	Epic	Acorn Electron
Castle of Riddles	1984	Acornsoft	Acorn Electron
Castle Of The Skull Lord	1984	Samurai	BBC/Electron
Caterpillar (IJK)	1984	Ijk	Acorn Electron
Caterpillar (Romik)	1984	Romik	Acorn Electron
Caveman	1985	Kansas City Systems	Acorn Electron
Caveman Capers	1985	Icon	Acorn Electron
Centibug (aka Centipede)	1984	Superior	Acorn Electron
Chart Challenge '88	1988	Outlook Enterprises	Acorn Electron
Chess (Acornsoft)	1984	Acornsoft	Acorn Electron
Chess (Micro Power)	1984	Micro Power	Acorn Electron
Chess (Superior)	1983	Superior	Acorn Electron
Children From Space	1984	Acornsoft/ASK	BBC/Electron
Chip Buster	1986	Software Invasion	BBC/Electron
Christmas Cracker	1984	Database Publications	BBC/Electron
Chuckie Egg	1984	A 'N F	Acorn Electron
Circus	1983	Channel 8	Acorn Electron
Citadel	1986	Superior	Acorn Electron
City Defence	1984	Bug Byte	Acorn Electron
Classic Adventure	1985	Melbourne House	BBC/Electron
Classic Arcade Games	1986	Database Publications	Acorn Electron
Classic Card and Board Games 1	1984	Database Publications	Acorn Electron
Classic Card and Board Games 2	1984	Database Publications	Acorn Electron
Clogger	1988	Impact	BBC/Electron
Codename: Droid	1987	Superior/Acornsoft	Acorn Electron
Colossus Bridge 4	1988	CDS Microsystems	BBC/Electron
Colossus Chess 4	1987	CDS Microsystems	BBC/Electron
Combat Lynx	1985	Alternative	BBC/Electron
Commando	1986	Elite	Acorn Electron
Condition Red	1987	Blue Ribbon	BBC/Electron
Confuzion	1984	Alternative	BBC/Electron
Confuzion	1985	Incentive	BBC/Electron
Constellation	1985	Superior	Acorn Electron
Contract Bridge	1984	Alligata	Acorn Electron
Cops	1990	Alpine	BBC/Electron
Cops 'n' Robbers	1987	Atlantis	BBC/Electron
Corn Cropper	1984	Cases Computer Simulations	Acorn Electron
Corporate Climber	1984	Dynabyte	Acorn Electron
Count With Oliver	1985	Mirrorsoft	BBC/Electron
Countdown to Doom	1988	Topologika	Acorn Electron
Counter Attack	1984	OIC	BBC/Electron
Crack It! Towers	1986	Mirrorsoft	BBC/Electron
Crack-Up	1990	Atlantis	BBC/Electron
Cranky	1984	Acornsoft/ASK	BBC/Electron
Crazee Rider	1987	Superior/Acornsoft	Acorn Electron
Crazy Erbert	1987	Alternative	BBC/Electron
Crazy Tracer	1983	Acornsoft	Acorn Electron
Creepy Cave	1988	Atlantis	BBC/Electron
Cricket	1986	Bug Byte	BBC/Electron
Crime And Detection Quiz	1984	Acornsoft/Ivan Berg	BBC/Electron
Croaker	1984	Micro Power	Acorn Electron
Crosswords	1986	Highlight	BBC/Electron
Crystal Castles	1986	U. S. Gold	Acorn Electron
Custard Pie Fight	1984	Comsoft	Acorn Electron
Cybertron Mission	1984	Micro Power	Acorn Electron
Cylon Attack	1983	A 'N F	Acorn Electron
Dallas	1983	Cases Computer Simulations	Acorn Electron
Dame Und Reversi		Acornsoft	Acorn Electron
Danger Uxb	1983	Micro Power	Acorn Electron
Dare Devil Dennis	1984	Visions	Acorn Electron
Darts	1988	Blue Ribbon	Acorn Electron
Dead Or Alive	1988	Alternative	BBC/Electron
Death Star	1985	Superior	Acorn Electron
Demon Knight		Forward	BBC/Electron
Denis Through The Drinking Glass	1984	Applications Software Specialists	BBC/Electron
Despatch Rider	1988	Audiogenic	BBC/Electron
Detective	1983	Argus Press	Acorn Electron
Diamond Mine	1983	MRM	Acorn Electron
Diamond Mine II	1986	Blue Ribbon	Acorn Electron
Diamond Pete	1986	Alligata	Acorn Electron
Directed Numbers	1984	Garland Computing	BBC/Electron
Dodgy Geezers	1987	Melbourne House	BBC/Electron
Dogfight: For Aces Only	1984	Slogger	Acorn Electron
Dominoes (Blue Ribbon)	1991	Blue Ribbon	BBC/Electron
Dominoes (Garland)	1984	Garland Computing	BBC/Electron
Dracula Island	1984	Kansas City Systems	Acorn Electron
Drain Mania	1985	Icon	Acorn Electron
Draughts	1983	Superior	Acorn Electron
Draughts And Reversi	1983	Acornsoft	Acorn Electron
Draw	1984	Micro Power	Acorn Electron
Dreamtime	1988	Heyley	Acorn Electron
Dunjunz	1987	Bug Byte	Acorn Electron
Eddie Kidd Jump Challenge	1985	Martech	BBC/Electron
Eiffel Tower	1985	Chalksoft	Acorn Electron
Electron Invaders	1984	Micro Power	Acorn Electron
Elementary Statistics	1984	Garland Computing	Acorn Electron
Elite	1984	Acornsoft	Acorn Electron
Elixir	1988	Superior/Acornsoft	Acorn Electron
Empire	1984	Shards	Acorn Electron
English Civil War	1983	Redshift	Acorn Electron
Enigma	1984	Brainbox	Acorn Electron
Entertaining English	1985	Highlight	Acorn Electron
Enthar Seven	1985	Robico	Acorn Electron
Erbert	1984	Microbyte	Acorn Electron
Escape From Moonbase Alpha	1983	Micro Power	Acorn Electron
Escape From Pulsar Seven	1983	Channel 8	Acorn Electron
Espionage		Modular Resources	Acorn Electron
E-Type	1990	The 4th Dimension	BBC/Electron
European Knowledge	1985	Micro Power	Acorn Electron
Evening Star	1987	Hewson Consultants	BBC/Electron
Exile	1988	Superior/Acornsoft	Acorn Electron
Exploring Adventures On The Electron	1984	Duckworth	Acorn Electron
F14 Tomcat	1990	Players	BBC/Electron
Factfile 500: Arithmetic (expansion)	1984	Kosmos	BBC Master Compact/Electron
Factfile 500: English Words (expansion)	1984	Kosmos	BBC Master Compact/Electron
Factfile 500: First Aid (expansion)	1984	Kosmos	BBC/Electron
Factfile 500: General Science (expansion)	1984	Kosmos	BBC Master Compact/Electron
Factfile 500: Junior General Knowledge (expansion)	1984	Kosmos	BBC Master Compact/Electron
Factfile 500: Know England (expansion)	1984	Kosmos	BBC Master Compact/Electron
Factfile 500: Know Scotland (expansion)	1984	Kosmos	BBC Master Compact/Electron
Factfile 500: Natural History (expansion)	1984	Kosmos	BBC Master Compact/Electron
Factfile 500: Senior General Knowledge (expansion)	1984	Kosmos	BBC Master Compact/Electron
Factfile 500: Spelling (expansion)	1984	Kosmos	BBC Master Compact/Electron
Factfile 500: Sport (expansion)	1984	Kosmos	BBC Master Compact/Electron
Factfile 500: Super Sports (expansion)	1984	Kosmos	BBC/Electron
Factfile 500: World Geography (expansion)	1984	Kosmos	BBC Master Compact/Electron
Fantasia Diamond	1984	Hewson Consultants	BBC/Electron
Feasibility Experiment	1982	Channel 8	Acorn Electron
Felicity Farm Girl	1984	Gemini	Acorn Electron
Felix and the Fruit Monsters	1984	Micro Power	Acorn Electron
Felix in the Factory	1984	Micro Power	Acorn Electron
Felix Meets The Evil Weevils	1985	Micro Power	Acorn Electron
Fighter Pilot	1984	Kansas City Systems	Acorn Electron
Fire Island	1984	Hollsoft	Acorn Electron
Firebug	1984	Acornsoft	Acorn Electron
Firienwood	1985	MP	Acorn Electron
First Moves	1984	Longman	BBC/Electron
First Steps With The Mr. Men	1983	Mirrorsoft	BBC/Electron
Five A Side Soccer	1984	Ijk	Acorn Electron
Five Stones Of Anadon	1985	Softek	BBC/Electron
Flight Path 737	1984	Anirog	Acorn Electron
Flint Strikes Back	1986	Potter Programs	BBC/Electron
Flying Scotsman	1985	Deekay	BBC/Electron
Football Manager	1986	Addictive Games	Acorn Electron
Footballer Of The Year	1987	Gremlin Graphics	BBC/Electron
Forth	1983	Acornsoft	Acorn Electron
Frak!	1986	Aardvark	Acorn Electron
Frankenstein 2000	1985	Icon/Audiogenic	BBC/Electron
Free Fall	1985	Acornsoft	Acorn Electron
Freier Fall	1983	Acornsoft	Acorn Electron
French on The Run	1987	Silversoft	BBC/Electron
Frenzy	1985	Micro Power	Acorn Electron
Froot Raid	1984	Audiogenic	Acorn Electron
Fruit Machine (Alligata)	1983	Alligata/Dixons	Acorn Electron
Fruit Machine (Doctorsoft)	1984	Doctorsoft	Acorn Electron
Fruit Machine (Superior)	1983	Superior	Acorn Electron
Fruit Machine Simulator	1984	Codemasters	BBC/Electron
Fun School 2: For 6-8 Years	1989	Database Publications	BBC/Electron
Fun School 2: For Under 6s	1989	Database Publications	BBC/Electron
Fun School: Under 12s	1984	Database Publications	Acorn Electron
Fun school: Under 5s	1984	Database Publications	BBC/Electron
Fun school: Under 8s	1984	Database Publications	Acorn Electron
Fun With Numbers	1983	Golem	BBC/Electron
Fun With Words	1983	Golem	BBC/Electron
Galactic Commander	1984	Micro Power	Acorn Electron
Galactic Patrol	1986	Mastertronic	BBC/Electron
Galadriel In Distress	1986	Potter Programs	BBC/Electron
Galaforce	1986	Superior/Acornsoft	Acorn Electron
Galaforce 2	1988	Superior/Blue Ribbon	BBC/Electron
Galaxy Wars	1985	Bug Byte	Acorn Electron
Galilee	1984	Shards	BBC/Electron
Games Of Deduction	1984	Clemoes	BBC/Electron
Gatecrasher	1984	Quicksilva	Acorn Electron
Gatwick Express	1985	Deekay	BBC/Electron
Gauntlet	1985	Micro Power	Acorn Electron
Geoff Capes Strongman	1986	Martech	BBC/Electron
Ghost Town	1983	Adventure International	Acorn Electron
Ghouls	1984	Micro Power	Acorn Electron
Gisburne'S Castle	1987	Martech	BBC/Electron
Go	1985	Acornsoft	Acorn Electron
Golden Voyage	1983	Adventure International	Acorn Electron
BBC Golf	1984	Yes! Software	BBC/Electron
Gorph	1983	Doctorsoft	Acorn Electron
Graham Gooch's Match Cricket	1987	Alternative	Acorn Electron
Graham Gooch's Test Cricket	1987	Audiogenic	BBC/Electron
Grid Iron	1988	Top Ten	BBC/Electron
Grid Iron 2	1984	Alternative	BBC/Electron
Grounded	1984	Potter Programs	BBC/Electron
Guardian	1985	Alligata	Acorn Electron
Gunfighter	1991	Atlantis	BBC/Electron
Gunsmoke	1985	Software Invasion	Acorn Electron
Gyroscope	1986	Melbourne House	BBC/Electron
Hampstead	1986	Melbourne House	BBC/Electron
Happy Letters	1984	Acornsoft/BES	Acorn Electron
Happy Writing	1984	Acornsoft/BES	Acorn Electron
Hareraiser: Finale	1984	Haresoft	Acorn Electron
Hareraiser: Prelude	1984	Haresoft	Acorn Electron
Harlequin	1984	Kansas City Systems	Acorn Electron
Heathrow	1984	Hewson Consultants	BBC/Electron
Helter Skelter	1990	Audiogenic	BBC/Electron
Hercules	1984	The Power House	BBC/Electron
Here And There With The Mr. Men	1985	Mirrorsoft	BBC/Electron
Hide And Seek	1984	Acornsoft/ASK	BBC/Electron
Hi-Q-Quiz	1989	Blue Ribbon	BBC/Electron
History Quiz	1984	Acornsoft/Ivan Berg	BBC/Electron
Hobgoblin	1990	Atlantis	BBC/Electron
Hobgoblin II	1990	Atlantis	BBC/Electron
Holed Out	1989	The 4th Dimension	BBC/Electron
Holed Out Extra Courses 1 (expansion)	1989	The 4th Dimension	BBC/Electron
Holed Out Extra Courses 2 (expansion)	1989	The 4th Dimension	BBC/Electron
Hopper	1984	Acornsoft	Acorn Electron
Horse Race	1984	Dynabyte	Acorn Electron
Hostages	1990	Superior/Acornsoft	BBC/Electron
House Of Horrors	1985	Kayess	Acorn Electron
Hulk	1984	Adventure International	Acorn Electron
Human Torch & The Thing	1986	Adventure International	Acorn Electron
Hunchback	1985	Ocean	Acorn Electron
Hunkidory	1987	Bug Byte	BBC/Electron
Hyperdrive	1984	Ijk	Acorn Electron
I Do	1984	Acornsoft/Ivan Berg	BBC/Electron
Icarus	1988	Mandarin	BBC/Electron
Ice Hockey	1987	Bug Byte	BBC/Electron
Identify Europe	1985	Kosmos	BBC/Electron
Impact	1988	Audiogenic	BBC/Electron
Impossible Mission	1986	U. S. Gold	BBC/Electron
In Search Of Atahaulpa	1988	Lee Software	BBC/Electron
Indoor Soccer	1989	Alternative	BBC/Electron
Inertia	1990	The 4th Dimension	BBC/Electron
Infant Pack	1984	Shards	Acorn Electron
Intergalactic Trader	1983	Micro Power	Acorn Electron
Introductory Cassette	1982	Acornsoft	Acorn Electron
Invader Maths	1984	Scorby Soft	Acorn Electron
Invaders (IJK)	1983	Ijk	Acorn Electron
Invaders (Superior)	1984	Superior	Acorn Electron
Invasion	1984	Argus Press	Acorn Electron
Invisible Man	1984	Chalksoft	Acorn Electron
Jack Attac	1986	Bug Byte	BBC/Electron
Jet-Boot Jack	1985	English	BBC/Electron
Jet Power Jack	1985	Micro Power	Acorn Electron
Jigsaw And Sliding Puzzles	1983	Golem	BBC/Electron
Joe Blade	1988	Players	BBC/Electron
Joe Blade 2	1989	Players	BBC/Electron
Joey	1985	Blue Ribbon	BBC/Electron
Johnny Reb	1984	Lothlorien	BBC/Electron
Joust (aka Kourtyard)	1988	Go-dax	BBC/Electron
Juggle Puzzle	1984	Acornsoft/ASK	BBC/Electron
Jump Jet	1986	Anirog	BBC/Electron
Jungle Jive	1984	Virgin Games	BBC/Electron
Junior Maths Pack	1985	Micro Power	Acorn Electron
Junior Pack	1984	Shards	Acorn Electron
Kamakazi	1984	A 'N F	Acorn Electron
Kane	1986	Mastertronic	BBC/Electron
Karate Combat	1986	Superior	BBC/Electron
Kayleth	1984	U. S. Gold	Acorn Electron
Killapede	1987	Players	BBC/Electron
Killer Gorilla	1984	Micro Power	Acorn Electron
Kingdom Of Hamil	1988	Topologika	Acorn Electron
Kissin' Kousins	1986	English	BBC/Electron
Landing Party	1985	Willow	BBC/Electron
Laser Reflex	1986	Talent	Acorn Electron
Last Ninja 2	1990	Superior/Acornsoft	BBC/Electron
League Challenge	1986	Atlantis	BBC/Electron
Lemming Syndrome	1984	Dynabyte	Acorn Electron
Licence To Kill	1987	Alternative	Acorn Electron
Locks Of Luck	1987	Magus	Acorn Electron
Locomotion	1985	BBCSoft/BBC Publications	BBC/Electron
Look Sharp	1985	Mirrorsoft	BBC/Electron
Loony Loco	1986	Kansas City Systems	BBC/Electron
Loopz	1991	Audiogenic	BBC/Electron
Lunar Rescue	1984	Alligata	Acorn Electron
Magic Mushrooms	1985	Acornsoft	Acorn Electron
Mailist	1984	Gemini	Acorn Electron
Mango	1984	Blue Ribbon	BBC/Electron
Maniac Mower	1986	Kansas City Systems	Acorn Electron
Map Rally	1984	Acornsoft/BES	Acorn Electron
Master Break	1991	Superior/Acornsoft	BBC/Electron
Maths Invaders	1984	Stell	Acorn Electron
Maths Orbiter	1984	Elm Computers	BBC/Electron
Maths With A Story 1	1984	BBCSoft/BBC Publications	Acorn Electron
Maths With A Story 2	1986	BBCSoft/BBC Publications	Acorn Electron
Maze	1985	Acornsoft	Acorn Electron
Mendips Stone	1986	Deekay	BBC/Electron
Merry Xmas Santa	1984	Icon	Acorn Electron
Meteors	1984	Acornsoft	Acorn Electron
Mexico '86	1986	Qualsoft	BBC/Electron
Micro Olympics	1984	Database Publications	Acorn Electron
Microball	1988	Alternative	BBC/Electron
Microgo1	1985	Edge Computers	BBC/Electron
Mikie	1986	Imagine	Acorn Electron
Millionaire	1985	Incentive	BBC/Electron
Mined Out	1984	Quicksilva	Acorn Electron
Mineshaft	1985	Alternative	BBC/Electron
Missile Control	1984	Gemini	Acorn Electron
Mission Xp2	1984	Hollsoft	Acorn Electron
Monkey Nuts	1984	Bug Byte	BBC/Electron
Monsters	1984	Acornsoft	Acorn Electron
Moon Buggy	1986	Kansas City Systems	Acorn Electron
Moon Raider	1984	Micro Power	Acorn Electron
Mr. Wiz	1984	Superior	Acorn Electron
Munchman	1983	Kansas City Systems	Acorn Electron
Music Quiz	1984	Acornsoft/Ivan Berg	BBC/Electron
Myorem	1986	Robico	Acorn Electron
Mystery Fun House	1983	Adventure International	Acorn Electron
Mystery Of The Java Star	1985	Shards	Acorn Electron
Night Strike	1984	Alternative	Acorn Electron
Nightmare Maze	1984	MRM	Acorn Electron
Nightworld	1986	Alligata	BBC/Electron
Note Invaders	1984	Chalksoft	Acorn Electron
Number Chaser	1984	Acornsoft/ASK	BBC/Electron
Number Games	1986	BBCSoft/BBC Publications	BBC/Electron
Number Gulper	1983	Acornsoft/ASK	BBC/Electron
Number Painter	1985	ASK	Acorn Electron
Number Puzzler	1983	Acornsoft/ASK	BBC/Electron
Og The Caveman	1984	Simon	Acorn Electron
Olympic Spectacular (aka Micro Olympics)	1984	Alternative	BBC/Electron
Omega Orb	1987	Atlantis	BBC/Electron
One Last Game	1985	Bevan Technology	BBC/Electron
Operation Safras	1987	Shards	Acorn Electron
Orbital	1988	Impact	BBC/Electron
Osprey	1984	Bourne	BBC/Electron
Overdrive	1985	Superior	Acorn Electron
Palace of Magic	1987	Superior/Acornsoft	Acorn Electron
Panik	1987	Atlantis	BBC/Electron
Paperboy	1987	Elite	Acorn Electron
Paras	1984	Lothlorien	BBC/Electron
Pascal'S Triangle	1984	Chalksoft	Acorn Electron
Pcw Games Collection	1984	Century	Acorn Electron
Pedro	1984	Imagine	Acorn Electron
Peg Leg	1984	Ijk	Acorn Electron
Pengi	1985	Visions	Acorn Electron
Pengwyn	1984	Postern	Acorn Electron
Percy Penguin	1989	Superior	Acorn Electron
Perplexity	1990	Superior/Acornsoft	BBC/Electron
Perseus and Andromeda	1983	Channel 8	Acorn Electron
Pettigrew'S Diary	1984	Shards	Acorn Electron
Phantom Combat Simulator	1986	Doctorsoft	BBC/Electron
Pharoah'S Tomb	1984	A 'N F	Acorn Electron
Philosopher'S Quest (Acornsoft)	1988	Acornsoft	Acorn Electron
Philosopher'S Quest (Topologika)	1988	Topologika	Acorn Electron
Pinball	1985	Microbyte	Acorn Electron
Pinball Arcade	1985	Kansas City Systems	Acorn Electron
Pipe Mania	1990	Empire	BBC/Electron
Pipeline	1988	Superior/Acornsoft	BBC/Electron
Pirate Adventure	1986	Adventure International	Acorn Electron
Pirate'S Peril	1984	Heyley	Acorn Electron
Plan B	1987	Bug Byte	BBC/Electron
Plan B2	1988	Bug Byte	BBC/Electron
Plane Crash	1988	Labyrinth	BBC/Electron
Planetoid	1985	Acornsoft	Acorn Electron
Play Your Cards Right	1986	Britannia	BBC/Electron
Playbox	1984	Comsoft	Acorn Electron
Plunder	1984	Cases Computer Simulations	Acorn Electron
Poker	1986	Duckworth	BBC/Electron
Polar Perils	1983	Squirrel	BBC/Electron
Pony Express	1984	Hollsoft	Acorn Electron
Pool Hall	1984	Dynabyte	Acorn Electron
Positron	1984	Micro Power	Acorn Electron
Predator	1989	Superior/Acornsoft	Acorn Electron
Pro Boxing Simulator	1984	Codemasters	BBC/Electron
Pro Golf	1988	Atlantis	BBC/Electron
Project Thesius	1986	Robico	Acorn Electron
Psycastria	1986	Audiogenic	BBC/Electron
Psycastria 2	1986	Audiogenic	BBC/Electron
Puncman	1984	Chalksoft	Acorn Electron
Puzzles	1987	NRG	BBC/Electron
Pyramid And Casino	1983	Garland Computing	BBC/Electron
Pyramid of Doom	1983	Adventure International	Acorn Electron
Q-Bix	1984	Alligata	Acorn Electron
Quest	1988	Superior/Acornsoft	BBC/Electron
Quest For Freedom	1987	Ijk	Acorn Electron
Quest For Merlin	1991	Excalibur	Acorn Electron
Quick Thinking	1986	Mirrorsoft	Acorn Electron
Railroader	1984	Stell	Acorn Electron
Ransack	1987	Audiogenic	BBC/Electron
Ravage	1987	Blue Ribbon	Acorn Electron
Ravenskull	1987	Superior	Acorn Electron
Read Right Away 1	1985	Highlight	Acorn Electron
Read Right Away 2	1986	Highlight	Acorn Electron
Read Right Away 3	1985	Highlight	Acorn Electron
Read Right Away 4	1985	Highlight	Acorn Electron
Realm Of Chaos: Village Of Lost Souls	1987	Robico	Acorn Electron
Rebel Planet	1988	U. S. Gold	Acorn Electron
Redcoats	1985	Lothlorien	BBC/Electron
Repton	1985	Superior	Acorn Electron
Repton 2	1986	Superior	Acorn Electron
Repton 3	1987	Superior	Acorn Electron
Repton Infinity	1988	Superior/Acornsoft	Acorn Electron
Repton Thru Time	1988	Superior/Acornsoft	Acorn Electron
Return Of Flint	1984	Potter Programs	BBC/Electron
Return Of R2	1988	Blue Ribbon	BBC/Electron
Return To Doom	1988	Topologika	Acorn Electron
Revenge Of Zor	1984	Kansas City Systems	Acorn Electron
Reversi (Kansas City Systens)	1984	Kansas City Systems	Acorn Electron
Reversi (Microbyte)	1984	Microbyte	Acorn Electron
Reversi (Superior)	1983	Superior	Acorn Electron
Rick Hanson	1986	Robico	Acorn Electron
Ricochet	1989	Superior/Acornsoft	BBC/Electron
Rik The Roadie	1987	Alternative	BBC/Electron
Ring Of Time	1985	Kansas City Systems	Acorn Electron
Roboto	1986	Bug Byte	BBC/Electron
Robotron: 2084	1985	Atarisoft	BBC/Electron
Roman Empire	1985	Lothlorien	BBC/Electron
Rome '90	1984	Qualsoft	BBC/Electron
Round Ones	1988	Alternative	BBC/Electron
Row Of Four	1984	Software For All	BBC/Electron
Royal Quiz	1984	Acornsoft/Ivan Berg	BBC/Electron
Rtc Birmingham	1985	Deekay	BBC/Electron
Rtc Crewe	1987	Deekay	BBC/Electron
Rtc Doncaster	1988	Deekay	BBC/Electron
Rtc Exeter	1987	Ashley Greenup	BBC/Electron
Rtc Manchester Piccadilly	1986	Ashley Greenup	BBC/Electron
Rtc Reading (aka Reading Station Control)	1986	Deekay	BBC/Electron
Rubble Trouble	1985	Micro Power	Acorn Electron
Runestaff	1984	Square	Acorn Electron
Sadim Castle	1985	MP	Acorn Electron
Saracoid	1984	Audiogenic	Acorn Electron
Sas Commander	1985	Comsoft	Acorn Electron
Savage Island Part 1	1983	Adventure International	Acorn Electron
Savage Island Part 2	1983	Adventure International	Acorn Electron
Savage Pond	1984	Starcade	Acorn Electron
Science Fiction Quiz	1984	Acornsoft/Ivan Berg	BBC/Electron
Scott Adams Scoops (Buckaroo Banzai)	1988	U. S. Gold	Acorn Electron
Sea Wolf	1984	Optima	Acorn Electron
Secret Mission	1986	Adventure International	Acorn Electron
Serpent'S Lair	1985	Comsoft	Acorn Electron
Shanghai	1985	Software Express	BBC/Electron
Shanghai Warriors	1989	Players	BBC/Electron
Shark	1988	Audiogenic	BBC/Electron
Shark Attack	1984	Romik	Acorn Electron
Shuffle	1986	Budgie	Acorn Electron
Sim	1985	Viper	BBC/Electron
Sim City	1991	Superior/Acornsoft	BBC/Electron
Sir Francis Drake	1985	LCL	BBC/Electron
Sixers	1983	OIC	BBC/Electron
Skirmish (aka Joust)	1988	Go-dax	BBC/Electron
Skyhawk	1987	Bug Byte	BBC/Electron
Smash And Grab	1985	Superior	Acorn Electron
Snake	1984	Kansas City Systems	Acorn Electron
Snapper	1984	Acornsoft	Acorn Electron
Snooker (Acornsoft)	1984	Acornsoft	Acorn Electron
Snooker (Visions)	1984	Visions	Acorn Electron
Soccer Boss	1988	Alternative	Acorn Electron
Soccer Supremo	1984	Qualsoft	BBC/Electron
Sooty'S Fun With Numbers	1991	Friendly Learning	BBC/Electron
Sorcery	1984	Pace Ltd	BBC/Electron
South Devon Hydraulics	1986	Deekay	BBC/Electron
Southern Belle	1986	Hewson Consultants	BBC/Electron
Space Ranger	1984	Audiogenic	Acorn Electron
Space Shuttle	1984	Microdeal	Acorn Electron
Space Station Alpha	1985	Icon	Acorn Electron
Space Trek	1984	Dimax Structured Software	Acorn Electron
Spaceman Sid	1984	English	Acorn Electron
Special Operations	1984	Lothlorien	BBC/Electron
Spectipede	1984	Mastertronic	Acorn Electron
Spellbinder	1988	Superior/Acornsoft	Acorn Electron
Sphere Of Destiny	1987	Audiogenic	BBC/Electron
Sphere Of Destiny 2	1984	Audiogenic	Acorn Electron
Sphinx Adventure	1985	Acornsoft	Acorn Electron
Spiderman	1987	Adventure International	Acorn Electron
Spitfire '40	1988	Alternative	BBC/Electron
Spooksville	1989	Blue Ribbon	BBC/Electron
Sporting Triangles	1984	CDS Microsystems	BBC/Electron
Sporting Triangles (Home Computer Club) (expansion)		CDS Microsystems	BBC/Electron
Sprites V2	1984	Simon	Acorn Electron
Spy Snatcher	1993	Topologika	Acorn Electron
Spycat	1988	Superior/Acornsoft	BBC/Electron
Square Puzzles	1984	Scorby Soft	Acorn Electron
Squeakaliser	1987	Bug Byte	BBC/Electron
Squeeze	1984	Acornsoft/ASK	BBC/Electron
Stairway To Hell	1986	Software Invasion	BBC/Electron
Star Drifter	1986	Firebird	BBC/Electron
Star Force Seven	1986	Bug Byte	BBC/Electron
Star Seeker	1984	Mirrorsoft	Acorn Electron
Star Wars	1988	Domark	BBC/Electron
Starmaze 2	1986	Mastertronic	Acorn Electron
Starship Command	1984	Acornsoft	Acorn Electron
Steve Davis Snooker	1986	CDS Microsystems	Acorn Electron
Stix	1984	Supersoft	Acorn Electron
Stock Car	1984	Micro Power	Acorn Electron
Stockbrokers		Forward	BBC/Electron
Stormcycle	1989	Atlantis	BBC/Electron
Stranded (Heyley)	1988	Heyley	Acorn Electron
Stranded (Superior)	1985	Superior	Acorn Electron
Strange Odyssey	1983	Adventure International	Acorn Electron
Stratobomber	1984	Ijk	Acorn Electron
Strike Force Harrier	1984	Mirrorsoft	Acorn Electron
Strip Poker II Plus	1989	Anco	BBC/Electron
Stryker's Run	1987	Superior/Acornsoft	Acorn Electron
Subway Vigilante	1990	Players Premier	BBC/Electron
Suds	1987	Riverdale	BBC/Electron
Summer Olympiad	1988	Micro Value	BBC/Electron
Super Fruit	1984	Simon	BBC/Electron
Super Golf	1983	Squirrel	Acorn Electron
Super Hangman	1984	Ijk	Acorn Electron
Super Pool	1985	Software Invasion	Acorn Electron
Super Spy Flint (aka Super Agent Flint)	1985	Potter Programs	BBC/Electron
Superior Soccer	1989	Superior/Acornsoft	Acorn Electron
Superlife	1984	Golem	BBC/Electron
Superman: The Game	1984	First Star	Acorn Electron
Survivor	1984	MP	Acorn Electron
Survivors	1987	Atlantis	BBC/Electron
Swag	1985	Micro Power	Acorn Electron
Swoop	1984	Micro Power	Acorn Electron
Sword Master	1984	Acorn User	Acorn Electron
Syncron	1990	Superior/Blue Ribbon	BBC/Electron
Table Adventures	1984	Acornsoft/ASK	BBC/Electron
Tales of the Arabian Nights	1985	Interceptor Micros	BBC/Electron
Tank Attack	1989	CDS Microsystems	BBC/Electron
Tarzan	1987	Martech	BBC/Electron
Tarzan Boy	1985	Alligata	Acorn Electron
Tempest	1985	Superior	Acorn Electron
Templeton	1987	Bug Byte	BBC/Electron
Ten Little Indians	1983	Channel 8	Acorn Electron
Tennis	1986	Bug Byte	BBC/Electron
Terminkalender	1983	Acornsoft	Acorn Electron
Terrormolinos	1986	Melbourne House	BBC/Electron
Test Match	1984	CRL	Acorn Electron
Tetris	1988	Mirrorsoft	BBC/Electron
Thai Boxing	1984	Anco	Acorn Electron
Thames Local	1986	Deekay	BBC/Electron
The Adventure Creator	1987	Incentive	Acorn Electron
The Banished Prince	1984	Orbit	Acorn Electron
The Boss	1984	Peaksoft	Acorn Electron
The Count	1984	Adventure International	Acorn Electron
The Dating Game	1984	Acornsoft/Ivan Berg	BBC/Electron
The Druid'S Circle	1984	Hollsoft	Acorn Electron
The Eye Of Zolton	1984	Softek	BBC/Electron
The Ferryman Awaits	1986	Kansas City Systems	Acorn Electron
The Five Doctors & The Twin Dilemma	1984	W. Games	BBC/Electron
The Giddy Game Show	1987	Mirrorsoft	BBC/Electron
The Golden Baton	1983	Channel 8	Acorn Electron
The Golden Figurine	1988	Atlantis	BBC/Electron
The Great Wall	1987	Artic Computing	BBC/Electron
The Greedy Dwarf	1984	Goldstar	Acorn Electron
The Hacker	1985	Firebird	Acorn Electron
The Hunt	1987	Robico	Acorn Electron
The Island	1984	A&B Computing	Acorn Electron
The Ket Trilogy	1987	Incentive	BBC/Electron
The Kingdom Of Klein	1984	Epic	Acorn Electron
The Last Days Of Doom And Hezarin	1990	Topologika	Acorn Electron
The Last Ninja	1989	Superior/Acornsoft	Acorn Electron
The Last Of The Free	1986	Atlantis	BBC/Electron
The Life of Repton	1988	Superior/Acornsoft	Acorn Electron
The Living Body	1985	Martech	BBC/Electron
The Lost Crystal	1987	Epic	Acorn Electron
The Magic Sword	1985	Database Publications	Acorn Electron
The Mid-Day Scot	1986	Deekay	BBC/Electron
The Mine	1984	Micro Power	Acorn Electron
The Night Sky	1984	Bridge	Acorn Electron
The Pobjoy Special	1984	A&B Computing	Acorn Electron
The Quest For The Holy Grail	1984	Epic	Acorn Electron
The Snow Queen	1984	A&B Computing	Acorn Electron
The Sorcerer Of Claymorgue Castle	1983	Adventure International	Acorn Electron
The Staff Of Law	1985	Potter Programs	BBC/Electron
The Stolen Lamp	1984	Lothlorien	BBC/Electron
The Taroda Scheme	1988	Heyley	Acorn Electron
The Time Machine	1983	Channel 8	Acorn Electron
The Times Crosswords Jubilee Puzzles	1987	Akom	BBC/Electron
The Times Crosswords Volume 1	1988	Akom	BBC/Electron
The Times Crosswords Volume 2	1988	Akom	Acorn Electron
The Times Crosswords Volume 3	1989	Akom	BBC/Electron
The Times Crosswords Volume 4	1989	Akom	BBC/Electron
The Twin Orbs Of Aalinor	1986	Potter Programs	BBC/Electron
The Ultimate Prize	1987	Heyley	Acorn Electron
The Valley	1984	Argus Press	Acorn Electron
The Valley Of The Kings	1985	MP	Acorn Electron
The Way of the Exploding Fist	1986	Melbourne House	Acorn Electron
The Wheel Of Fortune	1984	Epic	Acorn Electron
The Wizard Akyrz	1984	Paxman	Acorn Electron
The Wizard Of Akyrz	1982	Adventure International	Acorn Electron
Theatre Quiz	1984	Acornsoft/Ivan Berg	BBC/Electron
Thrust	1986	Superior	BBC/Electron
Thunderstruck	1986	Audiogenic	BBC/Electron
Thunderstruck 2	1987	Audiogenic	BBC/Electron
Time Trucker	1986	ASK	Acorn Electron
Timeman One	1984	Acornsoft/BES	Acorn Electron
Timeman Two	1984	Acornsoft/BES	Acorn Electron
Tomb Of Death	1984	Hollsoft	Acorn Electron
Traditional Board Games	1983	Garland Computing	BBC/Electron
Trafalgar	1984	Squirrel	Acorn Electron
Trapper	1988	Blue Ribbon	BBC/Electron
Treasure Hunt	1986	Macsen	BBC/Electron
Trek	1984	Acorn User	Acorn Electron
Turf Form	1984	Blue Ribbon	BBC/Electron
Tv Director	1987	Squirrel	Acorn Electron
Twin Kingdom Valley	1988	Bug Byte	Acorn Electron
UK Pm	1984	Ijk	Acorn Electron
Ultron	1985	Icon	Acorn Electron
Uranians	1987	Bug Byte	BBC/Electron
Vectors Maths Tutor	1984	Salamander	BBC/Electron
Vegas Jackpot	1987	Mastertronic	BBC/Electron
Video Card Arcade	1988	Blue Ribbon	BBC/Electron
Video Classics	1989	Silverbird	BBC/Electron
Video Pinball	1987	Alternative	BBC/Electron
Video'S Revenge	1985	Budgie	Acorn Electron
Voodoo Castle	1983	Adventure International	Acorn Electron
Vortex	1984	Software Invasion	Acorn Electron
Walk The Plank	1984	Mastertronic	Acorn Electron
War At Sea	1984	Betasoft	Acorn Electron
Warehouse	1988	Top Ten	BBC/Electron
Warp 1	1985	Icon	Acorn Electron
Watch Your Weight	1985	Acornsoft	Acorn Electron
Waterloo	1986	Lothlorien	BBC/Electron
Waxworks	1983	Channel 8	Acorn Electron
Webwar	1986	Artic Computing	BBC/Electron
Weetabix Versus The Titchies	1983	Romik	BBC/Electron
West	1985	Talent	Acorn Electron
What'S Eeyores?	1986	Magus	Acorn Electron
Which Salt?	1985	Micro Power	Acorn Electron
Whist Challenge	1985	Livewire	BBC/Electron
White Knight Mk 11	1984	BBCSoft/BBC Publications	Acorn Electron
White Magic	1989	The 4th Dimension	BBC/Electron
White Magic 2	1989	The 4th Dimension	BBC/Electron
Whizz Pack 1	1984	CRL	BBC/Electron
Whizz Pack 2	1984	CRL	BBC/Electron
Whoopsy	1984	Shards	BBC/Electron
Winter Olympiad	1988	Micro Value	BBC/Electron
Wizzy'S Mansion	1984	Audiogenic	Acorn Electron
Woks	1986	Artic Computing	BBC/Electron
Wongo	1985	Icon	Acorn Electron
Woodbury End	1986	Shards	BBC/Electron
Woodland Terror	1984	MP	Acorn Electron
Word Games With The Mr. Men	1986	Mirrorsoft	BBC/Electron
Word Hunt	1984	Acornsoft/ESM	Acorn Electron
Word Mover	1985	BBCSoft/BBC Publications	BBC/Electron
Wordhang	1984	Acornsoft/BES	Acorn Electron
Wordplay	1986	BBCSoft/BBC Publications	BBC/Electron
Wordsquare, Sea Battle, Pick-A-Pair	1984	Garland Computing	BBC/Electron
Workshop	1986	Acornsoft	Acorn Electron
Xadomy	1983	Brassington	BBC/Electron
Xanagrams	1984	Postern	Acorn Electron
XOR	1987	Logotron	Acorn Electron
Yie Ar Kung-Fu	1986	Imagine	Acorn Electron
Yie Ar Kung-Fu II	1987	Imagine	Acorn Electron
Zalaga	1985	Aardvark	Acorn Electron
Zany Kong Junior	1985	Superior	Acorn Electron
Zenon	1988	Impact	BBC/Electron
Ziggy	1987	Audiogenic	BBC/Electron
Zorakk The Conqueror	1984	Icon	Acorn Electron

== BBC Micro ==
There are 1549 commercial games listed here (excluding aftermarket titles), many of which are also compatible with the Acorn Electron, even where this is not explicitly indicated.

Name	Year	Publisher
180! Darts	1983	A&F Software
1984	1985	Incentive
2002	1983	Superior Software
3 In A Line	1988	CET
3D Bomb Alley	1983	Software Invasion
3D Convoy	1984	Doctor Soft
3D Dotty	1987	Blue Ribbon
3D Golf	1983	West Coast Personal Computers
3D Grand Prix	1984	Software Invasion
3-D Maze	1985	Acorn User, Micrograf
3D Maze (IJK)	1982	IJK Software
3D Munchy	1983	MRM Software
3D Pool	1989	Firebird Software, ProAction
3D Snooker	1990	Players Premier
3D Space Raider	1983	Alligata, Beau Jolly
3D Space Ranger	1983	Microbyte
3D Tank Zone	1984	Dynabyte
3D Tanx	1984	Dk'Tronics
3D Tennis	1983	West Coast Personal Computers
3Deep Space	1984	Postern
3D-Maze	1985	CET
737 Flight Simulator	1983	Salamander
747 Flight Simulator (DACC)	1983	DACC
747 Flight Simulator (Doctor Soft)	1983	Doctor Soft
767 Advanced Flight Simulator	1984	Flightdeck Software
9 Classic Card And Board Games No. 1	1986	Micro User
9 Classic Card And Board Games No. 2	1986	Micro User
A Maze In Space	1983	Opus
A Million Mazes	1983	LCL
A Question Of Sport	1988	Superior/Acornsoft
Aabatron	1984	Bevan Technology, Clemoes Software
ABM	1982	Alligata
Abyss	1984	Cases Computer Simulations
Accordion	1983	Gemini
Aces High	1984	Oasis Software
Acheton (Acornsoft)	1984	Acornsoft
Acheton (Topologika)	1987	Topologika
Acid Drops	1984	Firebird Software
Acnean Mutoids	1983	Soft Joe's Software
Acorn Adventure	1983	CSL Microdata
Adventure (Micro Power)	1982	Micro Power Ltd.
Adventure (Orchestrated Computing)	1982	Orchestrated Computing, Program Direct
Adventure 200	1982	Foilkade Ltd.
Adventure 4 Pack (The Philosopher's Stone, The Hexagram Of Trutania Valley, Inner Space, Stranded On Iloofrax)	1986	Potter Programs
Adventure Crazy	1986	A&B Computing
Adventure Crazy vol. 2	1986	A&B Computing
Adventure Quest	1982	Level 9 Computing
Adventureland	1984	Adventure International
Adventurous English	1986	Highlight
Air Traffic Control Simulator	1983	CSL Microdata
Airbrush	1983	Soft Hits, Which Micro? & Software Review
Airlift (Bug-Byte)	1982	Bug-Byte
Airlift (Superior)	1984	Superior Software
Airline	1983	Cases Computer Simulations
Air-Traffic Control Simulator	1983	Microdeal
Airwolf	1986	Elite, Encore
Alien 8	1984	Ultimate Play The Game, U.S. Gold, Ricochet
Alien Break-In	1983	Romik
Alien Destroyer	1983	Beebugsoft
Alien Destroyers	1982	Micro Power Ltd.
Alien Dropout	1982	Superior Software
Alien Planet	1982	Software For All
Alien Swirl	1983	Micro Power Ltd., Amcom
Alphatron	1986	Tynesoft
American Suds	1986	Riverdale Software
Amnesia	1985	A&B Computing
Anarchy Zone	1988	Atlantis
Android Attack	1983	Computer Concepts
Annabel Gray	1988	Lee Software
Answer Back Junior Quiz	1984	Kosmos Software
Answer Back Senior Quiz	1984	Kosmos Software
Answer Back Sport Quiz	1984	Kosmos Software
Antix	1984	Krypton Force
Apocalypse	1984	Command, Red Shift
Apollo	1983	Software Invasion
Apple Pie	1984	Visions Software
April Showers	1985	Bevan Technology
Aqua Attack	1984	BBC Soft, 8-Bit Software
Arc Pinball	1990	Shibumi Soft
Arcade 4 Pack (Hunchbach, Fruity (Potter), Yartsie, The Three Crystals)	1985	Potter Programs
Arcade Action (Snake, Dodgems, Space Invaders, Breakout)	1982	Acornsoft
Arcade Adventure (Brickout, War Of The Worlds, Toboggan Run, Shocker)	1988	Brilliant Computing
Arcade Challenge (Grouse Shooting, Break Out, Rapids, Squash, Space Cat)	1990	Brilliant Computing
Arcade Games (Cosmoids, BugVaders, Bogiemen)	1984	Clemoes Software
Arcade Pinball	1983	Microbyte
Arcade Soccer	1989	4th Dimension
Arcadians	1982	Acornsoft, Superior/Acornsoft
Area Radar Controller	1983	Software For All
Arena 3000	1983	Microdeal
Arkanoid	1987	Imagine, Hit Squad
Around The World In 40 Screens	1987	Superior/Acornsoft, Superior/Blue Ribbon
Arrow Of Death Part 1	1982	Digital Fantasia, Channel 8 Software, Paxman Promotions, Adventure International, Molimerx Ltd.
Arrow Of Death Part 2	1982	Digital Fantasia, Channel 8 Software, Paxman Promotions, Adventure International, Molimerx Ltd.
Asteroid Belt	1982	Computer Concepts
Asteroid Lander	1982	Argus Press Software, Personal Computing Today, A&B Computing
Asteroid Miner	1983	Optima
Asteroid Storm	1982	Micro Power Ltd.
Astro Blaster (HiTech)	1984	HiTech
Astro Blaster (Micrograf)	1985	Acorn User, Micrograf
Astro Navigator	1982	Micro Power Ltd.
Astro Plumber	1985	Blue Ribbon
Astro Tracker	1982	Beebugsoft
Atic Atac	1983	Ultimate Play The Game
Atlantis	1982	IJK Software
Atom Smasher (Alternative)	1985	Alternative Software, Electron User
Atom Smasher (Romik)	1983	Romik
Atomic Protector	1983	Optima, Micro User
Attack On Alpha Centauri	1983	Software Invasion
Auf Wiedersehen Pet	1984	Tynesoft
Aviator	1983	Acornsoft
Avon & Murdac	1988	Topologika
Awari	1983	CSL Microdata
B.C. Bill	1984	Imagine
Backgammon (Gemini)	1983	Gemini
Ballistix	1989	Superior/Acornsoft, Superior/Blue Ribbon
Balloon Buster	1989	Blue Ribbon
Balloons	1982	CJE Micros
Balls!	1988	Yes Marketing
Banana Man	1983	MRM Software
Bandits	1983	Oak Software
Bandits At 3 O'Clock	1983	Micro Power Ltd.
Banjax	1985	Robico
Bar Billiards	1987	Blue Ribbon
Barbarian II: Dungeon Of Drax	1989	Superior/Acornsoft, Superior/Blue Ribbon
Barbarian: The Ultimate Warrior	1988	Superior/Acornsoft, Superior/Blue Ribbon
Baron	1989	Superior/Acornsoft
Barrage	1983	Micro Power Ltd.
Battle 1917	1983	Cases Computer Simulations
Battle Of Britain (Betasoft)	1985	Betasoft
Battle Of Britain (Design People Software)	1987	Design People Software
Battle Planet	1984	ISP Marketing Ltd.
Battle Tank	1983	Superior Software, Beau Jolly
Battlefields	1985	BBC Soft
Battlezone 2000	1983	Lothlorien, Paxman Promotions
Battlezone Six	1986	Kansas City Systems
BBC Golf	1986	Yes! Software
BBC Mastermind	1984	Mirrorsoft, Ivan Berg Software
Beach-Head	1985	U.S. Gold
Bed Bugs	1984	Optima
Bee Beater	1983	Sulis Software
Beeb Chess	1982	Bug-Byte
Beeb Invaders	1982	Niblesoft
Beebgammon	1982	Bug-Byte
Beebmunch	1982	IJK Software
Beeb-Tote	1983	Micro Power Ltd.
Beebtrek	1982	Software For All
Beebugsoft Games 3 (Mindbender, Shape Match, Splat The Rat!)	1982	Beebugsoft
Beeline	1985	Robico
Beep-Beeb	1982	IJK Software
Beverly Hills Cop	1990	Tynesoft
Billiards	1983	H & H Software
Bird Strike	1984	Firebird Software
Birdie Barrage (aka Golf)	1985	CDS Software Ltd., Computasolve, Blue Ribbon
Birdies	1988	Inspiring Software
Birds Of Prey	1983	Romik
Bismarck	1988	BBC Soft
Black Box	1984	Acornsoft
Black Queen	1987	BBC Soft
Blackjack (Software Invasion)	1983	Software Invasion
Bladedancer	1993	Omicron Technologies
Blagger	1983	Alligata, Beau Jolly
Blast!	1989	Audiogenic Software Ltd.
Blip!	1988	Silverbird
Blitzkrieg	1984	Software Invasion
Blockbuster	1983	Micro Power Ltd.
Blockbusters (Domark)	1988	Domark
Blockbusters (Macsen)	1984	Macsen
Blocker	1984	Thor
Blood Of The Mutineers	1988	Robico
Blue Dragon	1984	MP Software Ltd.
BMX On The Moon	1984	Superior Software
Bobby Charlton Soccer	1985	DACC
Boffin	1985	Addictive Games
Boffin 2	1985	Addictive Games
Bomber Baron	1982	Optyx Software
Bomber Scramble	1983	Kansas City Systems
Bone Cruncher	1987	Superior/Acornsoft, Superior/Blue Ribbon
Bored Of The Rings	1985	Delta 4 Software, Silversoft Ltd.
Boris In The Underworld	1984	Superior Software
Boulder Dash	1988	Tynesoft
Bouncer (A&F)	1983	A&F Software
Bouncer (Acornsoft)	1984	Acornsoft
Bouncing Bill	1983	Oak Software
Bouncing Bomb Chase	1984	IJK Software
Bounty Bob Strikes Back	1985	U.S. Gold, U.S. Gold
Boxer	1984	Acornsoft
Bozo The Brave	1986	Tynesoft
Brain Aerobics	1985	Minic Business Services
Brain Teasers	1983	Dynabyte
Brainstorm	1984	Virgin Games
Breakout (IJK)	1982	IJK Software
Breakthrough	1988	Audiogenic Software Ltd.
Brian Clough's Football Fortunes	1987	CDS Software Ltd.
Brian Jacks: Superstar Challenge	1985	Martech, Beau Jolly, Ricochet
Brick 'Em In	1982	Software For All
Bridge Challenge	1984	Livewire Software Ltd.
Bridge Mentor II	1986	Minic Business Services
Bridge To The East	1984	Ixion Software
Bridgehead	1987	Pavilion Software
British Isles Geography Quiz	1983	Computer Market
Bruce Lee	1985	U.S. Gold
Buffalo Bill's Rodeo Games	1989	Tynesoft, Micro Value
Bug Bomb	1983	Virgin Games
Bug Eyes	1985	Icon, Audiogenic Software Ltd.
Bug Eyes II: Starman To The Rescue	1986	Audiogenic Software Ltd., Beau Jolly, Alternative Software
Bugs	1983	Virgin Games
Bugzap	1983	BBC Soft
Bullseye	1984	Macsen
Bumble Bee	1983	Micro Power Ltd.
Bumper Bundle (Bug Blaster, Lunar Rescue, Hell-Hole, The Crown Jewels)	1983	Alligata
Bun Fun	1984	Squirrel Software
Business Games	1983	Acornsoft
By Fair Means Or Foul (aka Pro Boxing Simulator)	1988	Superior/Acornsoft, Codemasters
Cabalist	1986	Ross Reuter Research
Caesar The Cat	1984	Mirrorsoft, Beau Jolly
Camelot	1989	Superior/Acornsoft, Superior/Blue Ribbon
Canyon Battle	1983	BBC Soft
Car Wars	1982	Software For All
Cargo	1984	Acornsoft
Carousel	1983	Acornsoft
Cascade Cassette 50 [BBC Micro]	1983	Cascade, 8-Bit Software
Castaway	1984	Simonsoft
Castle Assault	1984	MRM Software
Castle Blackstar	1984	CDS Software Ltd.
Castle Dracula	1984	Duckworth
Castle Frankenstein	1984	Epic Adventures
Castle Of Gems	1984	MRM Software
Castle Of Riddles	1983	Acornsoft
Castle Of The Skull Lord	1984	Samurai, Electron User Group
Castle Quest	1985	Micro Power Ltd.
Cat And Mouse	1982	Micro Power Ltd.
Catapilla	1983	Partis-Soft
Caterpillar (Computer Concepts)	1984	Computer Concepts
Caterpillar (Gemini)	1983	Gemini
Caterpillar (IJK)	1983	IJK Software
Caterpillar (Romik)	1984	Romik
Caveman	1984	Kansas City Systems
Caveman Adventure	1983	Micro Power Ltd.
Caveman Capers	1985	Icon, Audiogenic Software Ltd., Beau Jolly, Alternative Software
Cavey	1986	Players
Cells And Serpents	1983	Argus Press Software
Centibug	1982	Superior Software
Centipede	1983	Superior Software
Challenger	1984	Mastertronic
Champions	1982	Peaksoft
Chart Challenge	1986	Outlook Enterprises
Chart Challenge '88	1987	Outlook Enterprises
Chart Challenge Database Disc 1 (Expansion)	1986	Outlook Enterprises
Chart Challenge Database Disc 2 (Expansion)	1986	Outlook Enterprises
Chart Challenge Database Disc 3 (Expansion)	1986	Outlook Enterprises
Chart Challenge Database Disc 4 (Expansion)	1986	Outlook Enterprises
Checkout	1984	Virgin Games
Chemiplant	1983	H & H Software
Chess (Acornsoft)	1983	Acornsoft
Chess (Computer Concepts)	1982	Computer Concepts, Superior Software
Chess (Micro Power)	1982	Micro Power Ltd.
Chess (Micro Power) 16K	1982	Micro Power Ltd.
Chicane	1985	Kempston
Chickaroo	1983	Screenplay
Chieftain	1984	Virgin Games
Children From Space	1984	Acornsoft
Chip Buster	1985	Software Invasion
Cholo	1989	Firebird Software
Chopper	1984	Krypton Force, Popular Computing Weekly
Christmas Crackers (1983)	1983	Micro User
Christmas Crackers (1986)	1986	Micro User
Chrysalis	1985	Icon, Audiogenic Software Ltd.
Chuckie Egg	1983	A&F Software, Beau Jolly, Pick & Choose AKA Pick N Choose
Circus	1982	Digital Fantasia, Channel 8 Software, Paxman Promotions, Adventure International, Beau Jolly, Molimerx Ltd.
Circus Games	1988	Tynesoft
Citadel	1985	Superior Software, Superior/Acornsoft, Superior/Blue Ribbon
Citadel 2	1993	Superior/Acornsoft
City Defence	1982	Bug-Byte
City Defend	1983	M.G.B Software Support
Class 50 Fleet Manager	1986	Dee-Kay Systems
Classic Adventure	1984	Melbourne House
Classic Arcade Games (Alien Intruders, Mayday, Panzer Attack, Snapman)	1984	Micro User
Classic Arcade Games (Invaders, Tennis, Poc-Man, Break-Out)	1983	Ganymede Systems Ltd.
Clogger	1988	Impact
Cluedo	1986	Leisure Genius
Cobra	1982	Software For All
Code Breaker	1982	Micro Power Ltd.
Codename: Droid	1987	Superior/Acornsoft, Superior/Blue Ribbon
Colditz Adventure	1983	Superior Software, Electron User Group
Colditz!	1983	LVL
Colossal Adventure	1982	Level 9 Computing
Colossus Bridge 4	1988	CDS Software Ltd.
Colossus Chess 4	1985	CDS Software Ltd.
Combat Lynx	1985	Durell, Beau Jolly, Alternative Software
Commando	1985	Elite, Encore
Commonwealth Games '86	1986	Tynesoft
Complete Home Entertainment Centre	1986	CDS Software Ltd.
Computer Maniac's Diary 1989	1989	Domark
Condition Red	1986	Blue Ribbon
Confrontation	1983	Lothlorien
Confuzion	1985	Incentive, Alternative Software
Connect 4	1983	Kay Dee Software
Conquering Everest	1982	Argus Press Software, Personal Software, Computing Today
Constellation	1982	Micro Power Ltd.
Contract Bridge	1983	Alligata
Contraption	1985	Icon, Audiogenic Software Ltd.
Cops	1990	Alpine Software
Cops 'n' Robbers	1987	Atlantis
Copter Caper	1984	A&F Software
Corn Cropper	1983	Cases Computer Simulations
Cornish Riviera	1984	Dee-Kay Systems
Corporate Climber	1983	Dynabyte
Corpuscle	1985	Acorn User, Micrograf
Cosmic Asteroids	1983	Alligata
Cosmic Camouflage	1988	Superior/Acornsoft
Cosmic Combat	1983	Micro Power Ltd.
Cosmic Cruiser	1984	Imagine
Cosmic Fighter	1983	Kansas City Systems
Cosmic Intruders	1984	Paean Systems
Cosmic Kidnap	1983	Superior Software
Cosmos	1983	R.H. Software
Count With Oliver	1985	Mirrorsoft
Countdown	1987	Macsen
Countdown To Doom (Acornsoft)	1983	Acornsoft
Countdown To Doom (Topologika)	1987	Topologika
Counter Attack	1984	OIC
Cowboy Shoot-Out	1982	Micro Power Ltd.
Crack-It! Towers	1985	Mirrorsoft
Crack-Up	1989	Atlantis
Cranky	1984	Acornsoft
Crawler	1984	Watford Electronics
Crazee Rider	1987	Superior/Acornsoft, Superior/Blue Ribbon
Crazy Caves	1985	Swift
Crazy Er*Bert	1988	Alternative Software
Crazy Fruit (aka Las Vegas)	1983	Logic Systems, R.H. Software
Crazy Maze	1985	Longman Micro Software
Crazy Painter	1983	Superior Software
Crazy Tracer	1983	Acornsoft
Cred Breaks Out!	1986	TSB Magic Micro Club, 8-Bit Software
Creepy Cave	1987	Atlantis
Cribbage	1983	Superior Software
Cricket (A&F)	1983	A&F Software
Cricket (Bug-Byte)	1986	Bug-Byte
Crime And Detection Quiz	1983	Acornsoft, Ivan Berg Software
Croaker	1983	Micro Power Ltd., Beau Jolly
Croakit	1983	Kerian
Crosswords	1987	H.S. Software
Crown Of Mardan	1984	MP Software Ltd.
Cruncher	1983	Virgin Games
Crypt Capers	1984	Software Projects
Crystal Castles	1985	U.S. Gold
Cube Master	1982	Acornsoft
Custard Pie Fight	1984	Comsoft
Cute To Kill	1987	Power House, Mandarin
Cybertron Mission	1983	Micro Power Ltd.
Cyborg Warriors	1991	Superior/Acornsoft
Cylon Attack (A&F)	1983	A&F Software
Cylon Attack (Beebugsoft)	1982	Beebugsoft
Cylon Invasion	1986	Tynesoft
Daley Thompson's Super-Test	1985	Ocean
Dallas	1983	Cases Computer Simulations
Dam Buster [Sprite Animator]	1984	Screenplay
Dambusters	1983	Alligata
Danger Mower (aka Crazy Cut)	1983	Logic Systems, R.H. Software
Danger UXB	1983	Micro Power Ltd., Beau Jolly
Daredevil Dennis	1984	Visions Software
Darts (MRM)	1984	MRM Software
Darts (Superior)	1984	Superior Software
Dead Or Alive	1987	Alternative Software
Death XIV	1983	R.H. Software
Death's Head Hole	1983	Peaksoft, Words And Pictures
Deathstar	1985	Superior Software, Superior/Blue Ribbon, Beau Jolly
Deathstar [old]	1985	Superior Software
Defender	1982	Acornsoft
Deltic Fleet Manager	1986	Dee-Kay Systems
Demolator	1983	Visions Software
Demolish	1983	R.H. Software
Demon Knight	1983	Argus Press Software
Denis Through The Drinking Glass	1984	Applications Software Specialities
Depotmaster Cardiff	1990	Ashley Greenup
Depotmaster Finsbury Park	1989	Ashley Greenup
Depotmaster Old Oak Common	1989	Ashley Greenup
Depotmaster Stratford	1990	Ashley Greenup
Despatch Rider	1987	Audiogenic Software Ltd.
Desperate Dan's Dungeon	1984	Thor
Detective	1983	Argus Press Software
Devil's Causeway	1983	Database Software, Kay Dee Software
Diamond Mine	1983	MRM Software
Diamond Mine II	1985	Blue Ribbon
Diamond Pete	1986	Alligata, Unicorn Software, Micronet 800
Diamonds (Inspiring Software)	1988	Inspiring Software
Diamonds (Swift)	1985	Swift
Dictator	1983	Dk'Tronics
Digger	1983	Visions Software
Directed Numbers	1984	Garland Computing
Division One '85	1984	Qual-Soft
Doctor Who And The Mines Of Terror	1985	Micro Power Ltd.
Doctor Who And The Warlord	1985	BBC Soft
Doctor Who: The First Adventure	1984	BBC Soft
Dodge'Em	1983	Microgame Simulations
Dodgy Geezers	1986	Melbourne House
Dog Fight	1982	Bug-Byte
Dogfight	1983	Opus
Dominoes (Blue Ribbon)	1991	Blue Ribbon
Dominoes (Garland)	1984	Garland Computing
Double Gold (Dragon's Tooth, The Alien From Outer Space)	1987	Incentive
Double Phantom Combat	1986	Doctor Soft
Dracula Island	1984	Kansas City Systems
Dragon Quest	1982	Bug-Byte
Dragon Rider	1983	Salamander
Dragon World	1985	4Mation Educational Resources
Drain Mania	1985	Icon, Audiogenic Software Ltd.
Draughts (Computer Concepts)	1983	Computer Concepts
Draughts (Logic Systems)	1983	Logic Systems
Draughts (Micro Power)	1983	Micro Power Ltd.
Draughts (Superior)	1983	Superior Software
Draughts and Reversi	1983	Acornsoft
Dreamtime	1987	Heyley Software
Drogna	1984	Acornsoft
Duck!	1984	Firebird Software
Dune Rider	1983	Micro Power Ltd.
Dungeon Adventure	1982	Level 9 Computing
Dunjunz	1986	Bug-Byte
Eagle	1983	Salamander
Eagle Empire	1983	Alligata
Eagle's Wing	1984	Software Invasion
Ebony Tower	1984	Alligata
Eddie Kidd: Jump Challenge	1984	Martech, Beau Jolly, Mastertronic, Ricochet
Egyptian Adventure	1987	Duckworth
Eldorado Gold	1982	Micro Power Ltd.
Electro Freddy	1984	Softspot
Electron Invaders	1984	Micro Power Ltd.
Elite	1985	Acornsoft
Elite [enhanced]	1986	Acornsoft
Elixir	1987	Superior/Acornsoft, Superior/Blue Ribbon
Emerald Isle	1985	Level 9 Computing
Emlyn Hughes Arcade Quiz	1991	Audiogenic Software Ltd.
Emperor	1983	Molimerx Ltd.
Empire	1984	Shards Software, Paxman Promotions
English Civil War	1984	Red Shift
Enigma	1987	Chestnut Software
Enigma!	1983	Brainbox Software
Er*Bert	1984	Microbyte
Escape From Enthar Seven	1985	Robico
Escape From Moonbase Alpha	1983	Micro Power Ltd.
Escape From Orion	1983	Hopesoft
Escape From Pulsar 7	1982	Digital Fantasia, Channel 8 Software, Paxman Promotions, Adventure International, Molimerx Ltd.
Escape From Solaris	1984	Magic Software
Espionage	1984	Modular Resources Software
Estra	1984	Firebird Software
E-Type	1990	4th Dimension, Superior/Acornsoft
Europe	1983	Himap
European Knowledge	1984	Micro Power Ltd.
Evening Star	1987	Hewson Consultants
Ewgeebez	1984	Software Projects
Exile [64K]	1988	Superior/Acornsoft
Explorer	1991	Dragonsoft
F For Freddie	1983	Kansas City Systems
F14 Tomcat	1989	Players
Factfile 500 Arithmetic (Expansion)	1985	Kosmos Software
Factfile 500 English Words (Expansion)	1985	Kosmos Software
Factfile 500 First Aid (Expansion)	1985	Kosmos Software
Factfile 500 General Science (Expansion)	1985	Kosmos Software
Factfile 500 Junior General Knowledge (Expansion)	1985	Kosmos Software
Factfile 500 Know England (Expansion)	1985	Kosmos Software
Factfile 500 Natural History (Expansion)	1985	Kosmos Software
Factfile 500 Senior General Knowledge (Expansion)	1985	Kosmos Software
Factfile 500 Spelling (Expansion)	1985	Kosmos Software
Factfile 500 Super Sports (Expansion)	1985	Kosmos Software
Factfile 500 World Geography (Expansion)	1985	Kosmos Software
Fairground	1983	Superior Software
Fairytale Adventure	1983	Molimerx Ltd.
Family Games (Hangman, Kryptogram, Grand National)	1982	IJK Software
Fantasia Diamond	1985	Hewson Consultants
Fat Man Sam	1985	Firebird Software
Felix And The Fruit Monsters	1983	Micro Power Ltd.
Felix In The Factory	1983	Micro Power Ltd.
Felix Meets The Evil Weevils	1984	Micro Power Ltd., Beau Jolly
Fighter Pilot	1983	Kansas City Systems
Fire Hawks	1983	Postern
Fire Island	1986	Holl-Soft
Firebug	1984	Acornsoft
FireTrack	1987	Electric Dreams, Superior/Acornsoft
Firienwood	1982	MP Software Ltd.
First Moves	1984	Longman
First Moves Chess	1984	Longman Micro Software
First Steps With The Mr. Men	1983	Mirrorsoft
Five In A Row	1984	Hill MacGibbon
Five Spheres Of Goliath	1984	Kansas City Systems
Five-A-Side Football (aka Star Soccer)	1983	IJK Software
Flags (IJK)	1982	IJK Software
Flags (Micro-Aid)	1983	Micro-Aid
Flight Path	1985	Storm Software
Flint Strikes Back	1986	Potter Programs
Flint's Gold	1985	Acorn User, Micrograf
Flip! The Cartoon Strategy Game	1985	Icon
Flipper	1983	Microdeal
Flowers Of Crystal	1984	4Mation Educational Resources
Flying Scotsman	1984	Dee-Kay Systems
Football Director	1988	CDS Software Ltd.
Football Manager	1984	Addictive Games
Footballer Of The Year	1987	Gremlin, Kixx
Footer	1982	Micro Power Ltd.
Forbidden Fruit	1984	Voyager Software
Fortress	1983	Pace
Frak!	1986	Aardvark, Superior/Acornsoft
Frak! 16K	1984	Aardvark, Beau Jolly, Alternative Software, ProAction
Frankenstein 2000	1985	Icon, Atlantis
Franklin's Tomb	1984	Salamander
Free Fall	1983	Acornsoft
French On The Run	1984	Database Publications
Frenzy	1983	Micro Power Ltd., Beau Jolly
Friend or Foe?		Hill MacGibbon
Frogger (A&F)	1982	A&F Software
Frogger (aka Froggy) (Superior)	1983	Superior Software
Froggy (JSD)	1982	JSD Software
Froglet	1983	Argus Press Software, Computing Today
From Old Kent Road To Mayfair	1984	Richard S. Ball
Froot Raid	1987	Audiogenic Software Ltd.
Fruit Machine (Bug-Byte)	1982	Bug-Byte
Fruit Machine (Computer Concepts)	1983	Computer Concepts
Fruit Machine (Doctor Soft)	1984	Doctor Soft
Fruit Machine (Superior)	1982	Superior Software
Fruit Machine Simulator	1989	Codemasters
Fruity (Odyssey)	1985	Odyssey Software
Fruity Freddy	1983	Softspot
FSS Liberator	1984	Nebulae
Fun Games (Flash, Snake, Dodgems, Breakout)	1982	BBC Soft, Acornsoft
Fun School 2: For 6-8 Years	1989	Database Publications
Fun School 2: For Under 6s	1989	Database Publications
Fun School: Under 12s	1984	Database Publications
Fun school: Under 5s	1984	Database Publications
Fun school: Under 8s	1984	Database Publications
Fun With Numbers	1983	Golem
Fun With Words	1983	Golem
Funfair	1983	Softspot
Future Shock	1986	Tynesoft
Galactic Commander	1982	Micro Power Ltd.
Galactic Empire	1983	GEM
Galactic Firebird	1983	Kansas City Systems
Galactic Intruders	1982	Software For All, Cosma
Galactic Patrol	1984	Mastertronic
Galactic Wipeout	1983	R.H. Software
Galadriel In Distress	1984	Potter Programs, Electron User Group
Galaforce	1986	Superior/Acornsoft, Superior/Blue Ribbon, Beau Jolly
Galaforce 2: Aliens' Revenge	1988	Superior/Acornsoft, Superior/Blue Ribbon
Galaxian	1983	Software Invasion
Galaxians	1982	Superior Software
Galaxy Birds	1982	Superior Software
Galaxy Conflict	1984	Martech
Galaxy Raiders	1984	Visions Software
Galaxy Wars	1982	Bug-Byte
Galilee	1984	Shards Software
Gambit	1984	Acornsoft
Game Galore 1 (Fruit Worm, Fruity Tooty, Invasion Alert, Loony Lander)	1983	Computer Concepts
Games Compendium B1 (Simon, Hangman (Salamander), Alphabet Soup, Fireman)	1983	Salamander
Games Compendium B3 (Boot Hill, Bomber, Mole!)	1984	Salamander
Games Of Deduction (3D Maze (Clemoes), Colour-Cube, Master Code)	1984	Clemoes Software
Games of Logic (Hexa15, Reverse)	1982	Golem
Games Of Strategy (Galaxy, Gomoku, Masterbrain, Reversi)	1982	BBC Soft, Acornsoft
Games Pack 1 (Break-Up, Robot, Spacefight)	1982	Viking Software
Games Pack 1 (Mastermind, Ski-Run, Car Maze)	1983	Logic Systems
Gatecrasher	1984	Quicksilva
Gateway To Karos	1984	Acornsoft
Gateway To The Skies	1983	Solar Soft
Gatwick Express	1986	Dee-Kay Systems
Gauntlet	1984	Micro Power Ltd.
Geoff Capes: Strong Man	1984	Martech, Beau Jolly, Mastertronic, Ricochet
Ghost Town	1984	Adventure International
Ghouls	1983	Micro Power Ltd., Beau Jolly
Giant Killer	1987	Topologika
Gideon's Gamble	1983	Superior Software
Gin Rummy	1983	Gemini
Gisburne's Castle	1984	Martech, Beau Jolly, Ricochet
Glider Pilot	1985	Apex
Glider Pilot 2	1986	Apex
Gnasher	1983	Superior Software
Gnome Ranger [picture disc]	1987	Level 9 Computing
Gnome Ranger [Text]	1987	Level 9 Computing
Go	1984	Acornsoft
Goal!	1986	Tynesoft
Gobbler	1983	M.G.B Software Support
Gold Digger	1984	Firebird Software
Gold Run	1985	Macsen
Golden Games	1984	Micro User
Golf	1982	Bug-Byte
Golforama	1984	Dialsoft
Gomoko / Reversi	1982	Pro Software
Gomoku	1982	Micro Power Ltd.
Gorf	1983	Doctor Soft
Gorph	1983	Doctor Soft
Grabit	1984	Krypton Force
Graham Gooch's Test Cricket	1987	Audiogenic Software Ltd.
Grand Prix	1982	Software For All
Grand Prix Construction Set	1987	Superior/Acornsoft
Granny's Garden	1983	4Mation Educational Resources
Great Britain Ltd.	1982	Hessel
Green Beret	1987	Imagine, Hit Squad
Gremlins	1985	Adventure International
Grid Iron	1987	Top Ten
Grid Iron 2	1989	Alternative Software
Grid-Cycle	1984	Watford Electronics
Growing Pains	1984	Alligata
Guardian	1984	Alligata
Guardian Of Doomsday	1985	Quest
Gulp!	1983	Peaksoft
Gumshoe Logic	1984	Megacycal Software
Gunfighter	1990	Atlantis
Gunsmoke	1984	Software Invasion, Tynesoft
Gymkhana	1983	Kesparsoft
Gyroscope	1985	Melbourne House
Hacker 2000	1985	Acorn User, Micrograf
Hampstead	1985	Melbourne House
Hangdroid	1982	Micromode, 8-Bit Software
Hangman (MP Software)	1982	MP Software Ltd.
Hangman (MRM)	1984	MRM Software
Hangman (Sigma Soft)	1984	Sigma Soft, 8-Bit Software
Hareraiser Finale	1984	Haresoft
Hareraiser Prelude	1984	Haresoft
Harlequin	1984	Kansas City Systems
Haunted House Adventure	1983	Silverlind Ltd.
Head coach Deluxe	1986	Coda
Head coach V3	1988	Coda
Heathrow ATC	1984	Hewson Consultants
Heist	1983	Softspot
Hell Driver	1983	Micro Power Ltd.
Helter Skelter	1990	Audiogenic Software Ltd.
Hercules	1987	Power House
Here And There With The Mr. Men	1985	Mirrorsoft
Hex	1988	Larsoft
Hexanoids	1984	Cassell & Company Ltd.
Hi-Bouncer	1984	Mirrorsoft
Hide And Seek	1984	Acornsoft
High-Rise Horror	1984	Virgin Games
Hi-Q Quiz	1989	Blue Ribbon
History Quiz	1983	Acornsoft, Ivan Berg Software
Hitch Hiker	1982	Computer Concepts
Hobgoblin	1989	Atlantis
Hobgoblin 2	1990	Atlantis
Holed Out Extra Courses 1 (expansion)	1989	4th Dimension
Holed Out Extra Courses 2 (expansion)	1989	4th Dimension
Holed Out!!	1989	4th Dimension
Holmes: The Mystery Of The Dark Shadow	1986	Logotron Recreational Products
Holy Horrors	1984	Romik
Honest Joe / Fruit Machine	1983	Beebugsoft
Honeybug	1983	Silverlind Ltd.
Hopper	1983	Acornsoft
Horror Castle	1983	A&F Software
Horse Race	1983	Dynabyte
Hostages	1990	Superior/Acornsoft
House Of Horrors	1984	Kay-Ess Computer Products, Orion Software
HuBert	1984	Visions Software
Humphrey	1984	Mr. Micro
Hunchback	1983	Ocean
Hunkidory	1986	Bug-Byte
Hyper Sports	1984	Imagine, Hit Squad
Hyperball	1990	Superior/Acornsoft
Hyperdrive	1982	IJK Software
I Spy Red	1989	Foxsoft Adventures
Ian Botham's Test Match	1986	Tynesoft
Icarus	1988	Power House, Mandarin
Ice Hockey	1986	Bug-Byte
Identify Europe	1983	Kosmos Software
IJK Casino (Blackjack, Roulette)	1983	IJK Software
Imogen	1986	Micro Power Ltd., Superior/Acornsoft
Impact!	1987	Audiogenic Software Ltd.
Impossible Mission	1986	U.S. Gold
In Search Of Atahaulpa	1987	Lee Software
Indoor Soccer	1988	Alternative Software
Indoor Sports	1988	Tynesoft
Inertia	1990	4th Dimension
Infinity	1988	White Panther
Ingrid's Back [picture disc]	1988	Level 9 Computing
Ingrid's Back [Text]	1988	Level 9 Computing
Inheritance	1982	Hessel
Inkosi	1982	Chalksoft
Intergalactic Trader	1983	Micro Power Ltd.
International Megasports	1986	Audiogenic Software Ltd.
Inu	1986	MRJ
Invaders	1982	MP Software Ltd.
Invisible Man	1983	Chalksoft
Island Adventure	1983	Glengary Soft
Island Of Xaan	1984	Robico
Islandia	1984	Red Shift
It's Magic	1986	Central Computing
J.R.	1982	Software For All
Jack And The Beanstalk	1984	Superior Software
Jack Attack	1986	Bug-Byte
Jam Butty	1985	Alternative Software, Electron User
JCB Digger	1984	Acornsoft
Jet Boat	1984	Software Invasion
Jet Power Jack	1984	Micro Power Ltd., Beau Jolly
Jet Set Willy	1986	Tynesoft
Jet Set Willy II: The Final Frontier	1986	Tynesoft
Jet-Boot Jack	1984	English Software, Beau Jolly
Jet-Pac	1983	Ultimate Play The Game, U.S. Gold, Ricochet
Jigsaw	1984	Kansas City Systems
Jigsaw And Sliding Puzzles	1983	Golem
Jigsaw Puzzles	1984	Ega Beva
Jingle Bells	1986	Jack And Jill Software, 8-Bit Software
Joe Blade	1988	Players
Joe Blade II	1988	Players
Joey	1985	Blue Ribbon
Johnny	1988	Database Publications
Johnny Reb	1983	Lothlorien, Paxman Promotions
Joust (aka Skirmish)	1986	Aardvark, Acornsoft, Go-dax
Juggle Puzzle	1983	Acornsoft, ASK
Jumbo	1982	Molimerx Ltd.
Jump Jet (Anirog)	1985	Anirog
Jump Jet (Doctor Soft)	1984	Doctor Soft
Jungle Jive	1984	Virgin Games
Kane	1986	Mastertronic
Karate Combat	1986	Superior Software, Superior/Blue Ribbon, Beau Jolly
Karl's Cavern	1984	Software Projects
Kastle	1986	Tynesoft
Katakombs	1982	Golem
Kayleth	1987	U.S. Gold, Adventure Soft UK
Ken 1 (Darts, Poker Dice, Pentominoes)	1984	Statasoft
Ken 2 (Ludo, Tables, Tangrams, Match-Up)	1984	Statasoft
Kensington	1984	Leisure Genius
Killapede	1986	Players
Killer Gorilla	1983	Micro Power Ltd., Beau Jolly
Killer Gorilla 2	1988	Superior Software, Superior/Acornsoft
Kingdom Of Hamil (Acornsoft)	1983	Acornsoft
Kingdom Of Hamil (Topologika)	1987	Topologika
Kingdom Of Klein	1984	Epic Adventures
Kissin' Kousins	1985	English Software, Beau Jolly
Kix	1986	Superior Software
Klax	1990	Domark
Knight Lore	1984	Ultimate Play The Game, U.S. Gold, Ricochet
Knight Orc [picture disc]	1987	Level 9 Computing, Rainbird
Knight Orc [Text]	1987	Level 9 Computing, Rainbird
Knockout	1983	R.H. Software
Kourtyard	1988	Go-Dax
Krakout	1987	Gremlin, Kixx
Kremlin	1983	Doctor Soft
L: A Mathemagical Adventure	1984	Association Of Teachers Of Mathematics
Labyrinth	1984	Acornsoft, Superior/Acornsoft
Labyrinths Of LaCoshe	1983	Micro Power Ltd.
Ladder Maze	1983	Superior Software
Lancelot	1988	Level 9 Computing, Mandarin
Land Of Chark	1984	Delta 4 Software
Land Of Tezrel	1984	Omen
Landfall	1983	Virgin Games
Laser Command	1982	Micro Power Ltd.
Laser Reflex	1984	Talent Computer Systems
Last Days Of Doom & Hezarin	1990	Topologika
Lazer Cycle	1984	System 3 Software
League Challenge	1986	Atlantis
League Division One	1984	Qual-Soft
Leapfrog	1983	IJK Software
Ledgeman	1984	Software Projects
Legend Of Tarzan	1987	Martech
Legion Adventure	1984	Software Projects
Lemming Syndrome	1983	Dynabyte
Liberator	1983	Gemini
Licence To Kill	1990	Domark
Licenced To Kill	1987	Alternative Software
Lickey Route	1985	Dee-Kay Systems
Light Cycle	1983	PSS
Light Cycles	1983	Paean Systems
Lines	1984	CET
Litecycles	1983	Pajsoft
Locks Of Luck	1986	Magus
Loco Motion	1985	BBC Soft
Lode Runner	1985	Software Projects
London Adventure	1986	Cambridge ELT Software
Look Sharp	1985	Mirrorsoft
Looney Lift	1983	H & H Software
Loony Loco	1985	Kansas City Systems
Loopz	1991	Audiogenic Software Ltd.
Lords Of Time	1984	Level 9 Computing
Lost City	1983	Superior Software
Lost In Space	1983	Salamander
Lunar Invasion	1987	Alternative Software
Lunar Jetman	1985	Ultimate Play The Game, U.S. Gold
Lunar Lander	1982	A&F Software
Mad Monty	1983	Screenplay
Magic Adventure 1	1983	Kansas City Systems
Magic Eel	1982	Beebugsoft
Magic Mushrooms	1985	Acornsoft, Superior/Acornsoft
Main-Line	1982	CSL Microdata
Making The Most Of The Micro (Patience, Dice Game)	1984	BBC Soft
Mallard	1988	SRS
Manage	1983	Cases Computer Simulations
Mancala	1988	Inspiring Software
Mango	1987	Blue Ribbon
Maniac Mower	1983	Kansas City Systems
Manic Miner	1984	Software Projects, Beau Jolly
Mars Lander	1983	BBC Soft
Mars Mission	1985	Acorn User, Micrograf
Martello Tower	1984	ESM
Martian Attack	1983	Micro Power Ltd.
Martians	1982	Micro Power Ltd.
Master Break	1991	Superior/Acornsoft
Master Cutler	1984	Dee-Kay Systems
Masters Of The Universe – Super Adventure	1986	U.S. Gold, Adventure Soft UK
Match Day	1985	Ocean
Maths Orbiter	1984	Elm Computers
Mayday	1984	Bevan Technology, Clemoes Software
Maze (Acornsoft)	1984	Acornsoft, Superior/Acornsoft
Maze (CET)	1984	CET
Maze Invaders	1982	Micro Power Ltd.
Maze Man	1984	CJE Micros
Mega Apocalypse	1988	Martech
Mega Force	1987	Tynesoft
Megarok	1987	Bug-Byte
Mendips Stone	1986	Dee-Kay Systems
Merlin's Castle	1984	ESM
Merry Xmas Santa	1985	Icon
Merry-Go-Round	1985	Dee-Kay Systems
Meteor Mission	1984	Acornsoft
Meteors	1982	Acornsoft, Superior/Acornsoft
Mexico '86	1985	Qual-Soft
Micro Derby	1982	Bug-Byte
Micro Olympics	1985	Database Publications, Alternative Software
Microball	1987	Alternative Software
Microbe	1983	Virgin Games
Microcosm	1985	Firebird Software
Microgo1	1984	Edge Computers Ltd.
Microquest	1983	Glengary Soft
Midway	1988	Design People Software
Mikie	1986	Imagine
Millionaire	1984	Incentive, Beau Jolly
Mined Out	1983	Quicksilva
Minefield (Eduquest)	1982	Eduquest
Minefield (Graphic Research)	1983	Graphic Research Ltd.
Miner	1983	Ixion Software
Mineshaft	1984	Durell, Beau Jolly, Alternative Software
Missile Attack	1983	Doctor Soft
Missile Base	1982	Acornsoft
Missile Control (CJE)	1982	CJE Micros
Missile Control (Gemini)	1983	Gemini
Missile Strike	1984	Superior Software
Mission XP2	1986	Holl-Soft
Model A Invaders	1982	IJK Software
Model B Invaders	1982	IJK Software
Monaco	1983	Alligata
Monkey Nuts	1988	Bug-Byte
Monopoly	1985	Leisure Genius
Monster Mash	1986	Unicorn Software
Monsters	1982	Acornsoft, Superior/Acornsoft
Monsters & Magic	1984	ISP Marketing Ltd.
Moon Buggy	1985	Kansas City Systems
Moon Cresta	1986	Incentive, Alternative Software
Moon Mission	1984	Superior Software, Beau Jolly
Moon Raider	1983	Micro Power Ltd., Beau Jolly
Mouse Trap	1986	Tynesoft
Mr. Ee!	1984	Micro Power Ltd., Beau Jolly
Mr. Freeze	1985	Firebird Software
Mr. Mephisto	1983	Euro-Byte
Mr. Wimpy	1983	Ocean
Mr. Wiz!	1984	Superior Software
Munchman	1983	Kansas City Systems
Munchyman	1982	Micro Power Ltd.
Music Quiz	1983	Acornsoft, Ivan Berg Software
Mutant Invaders	1982	IJK Software
Mutant Spiders	1983	Superior Software
Myorem	1986	Robico
Mystery Fun House	1984	Adventure International
Mystery Mission	1987	Alpine Software
Mystery Of The Java Star	1984	Shards Software
Mystery Of The Lost Sheep	1986	Central Computing
Napoleon	1983	Molimerx Ltd.
Neanderthal Man	1984	Alligata
Nemesis	1983	Micro Power Ltd.
Network Solent And Sarum Fleet Manager	1990	Ashley Greenup
Neutron	1984	Superior Software
Nevryon	1990	4th Dimension, Superior/Acornsoft
New Testament Adventure Quiz	1985	BIBLEchip
Nifty Lifty	1984	Visions Software
Night Strike	1986	Alternative Software
Night World	1985	Alligata
Nightflite	1983	Hewson Consultants
Nightmare	1985	Southway Software
Nightmare Maze	1984	MRM Software
Nightshade	1985	Ultimate Play The Game, U.S. Gold, Ricochet
Noc-A-Bloc	1983	Virgin Games
Not A Penny More, Not A Penny Less	1987	Domark
Noughts + Crosses	1988	Inspiring Software
Noughts And Crosses	1982	BBC Soft
Number Chaser	1984	Acornsoft
Number Games	1986	BBC Soft
Number Gulper	1983	Acornsoft
Number Puzzler	1983	Acornsoft
Nutcraka	1984	Software Projects
Oblivion	1983	Bug-Byte
Ogles	1983	Games Machine Ltd.
Old Father Time	1983	Bug-Byte
Olympic Decathlon	1985	Alligata
Omega	1983	Beebugsoft
Omega Orb	1987	Audiogenic Software Ltd., Atlantis
Omega Probe	1984	Optima, Micro User
One Last Game	1984	Bevan Technology, Clemoes Software
Operation Safras	1987	Shards Software
Orbit Zero	1983	Graphic Research Ltd.
Orbital	1989	Impact
Orpheus And The Underworld	1985	A&F Software
Osprey	1984	Bourne
Ossie	1984	Peaksoft
Overdrive	1984	Superior Software
Owzat	1983	Virgin Games
Oxbridge	1986	Tynesoft
Painter (A&F)	1983	A&F Software
Painter (Micro Power) (aka Demon Decorator)	1983	Micro Power Ltd.
Painter (Thor)	1984	Thor
Palace Of Magic	1986	Superior/Acornsoft, Superior/Blue Ribbon
Pandemonium	1986	Top Ten
Panik	1987	Atlantis
Pantry Antics	1985	BBC Soft
Paperboy	1987	Elite, Encore
Paradox (aka Timeslip)	1993	Really Good Software Company
Paranoid Pete	1984	Ubik
Paras	1983	Lothlorien, Paxman Promotions
Pass Go	1983	Kay Dee Software
Passport To Death	1983	Silverlind Ltd.
Patience	1982	IJK Software
Paul Daniels' Magic Show	1984	Acornsoft
Pay Off	1984	Bignose Software
Peak Fleet Manager	1986	Dee-Kay Systems
Pearl Harbour	1983	Microgame Simulations
Pedro	1984	Imagine
Peg Leg	1983	IJK Software
Pengi	1984	Visions Software
Penguin	1983	H-Soft
Pengwyn	1983	Postern
Pentiles	1983	Silverlind Ltd.
Percy Penguin	1984	Superior Software, Superior/Acornsoft, Superior/Blue Ribbon
Perplexity	1989	Superior/Acornsoft
Perseus And Andromeda	1983	Digital Fantasia, Channel 8 Software, Paxman Promotions, Adventure International, Molimerx Ltd.
Pete The Plastered Postman	1982	Argus Press Software, Personal Computing Today
Pettigrew's Diary	1984	Shards Software
Phantom	1987	Tynesoft
Phantom Combat	1985	Doctor Soft
Pharaoh's Curse	1984	H-Soft
Pharaoh's Tomb	1982	A&F Software
Philosopher's Quest (Acornsoft)	1982	Acornsoft
Philosopher's Quest (Topologika)	1987	Topologika
Pilgrim's Progress	1984	Scripture Union
Pimania	1982	Automata
Pinball Arcade	1983	Kansas City Systems
Pipe Mania	1990	Empire, Superior/Acornsoft
Pipeline	1988	Superior/Acornsoft, Superior/Blue Ribbon
Piquet	1983	Gemini
Pirate	1983	Chalksoft
Pirate Adventure	1984	Adventure International
Pirates	1983	Screenplay
Pirates In Space	1982	Bug-Byte
Pirate's Peril	1986	Heyley Software
Plan B	1987	Bug-Byte
Plan B2	1987	Bug-Byte
Plane Crash	1988	Labyrinth
Planes	1982	A&F Software
Planetarium	1983	Superior Software
Planetfall	1983	Argus Press Software, Computing Today
Planetoid	1982	Acornsoft, Superior/Acornsoft
Plankwalk	1983	Virgin Games
Play Your Cards Right	1986	Britannia
Playbox	1984	Comsoft
Plegaron People Eaters	1983	R.H. Software
Plunder	1984	Cases Computer Simulations
Plutonium Plunder	1984	Micro Power Ltd.
Podd	1983	ASK, Acornsoft, ESM
Poker	1986	Duckworth
Poker Dice	1982	Micro Power Ltd.
Polar Perils	1984	Squirrel Software
Polaris	1982	Bug-Byte
Pole Position	1984	Atarisoft
Polecat	1982	A&F Software
Pontoon (H-Soft)	1983	H-Soft
Pontoon (IJK)	1982	IJK Software
Pontoon (M & M Software)	1983	M & M Software
Pontoon (Superior)	1982	Superior Software
Pony Express	1986	Holl-Soft
Pool Hall	1983	Dynabyte
Positron	1983	Micro Power Ltd.
Potholer	1984	Southway Software
Powerboat Racing	1982	Futura Software
Powerplay	1985	Arcana Software Design
Predator	1989	Superior/Acornsoft, Superior/Blue Ribbon
Prison	1985	Swift
Pro Boxing Simulator	1990	Codemasters
Pro Golf	1988	Atlantis
Programmer's Revenge	1984	Colisoft
Project Thesius	1986	Robico
Proteanse	1983	Dk'Tronics
Protector	1983	Quicksilva
Psycastria	1986	Audiogenic Software Ltd.
Psycastria 2	1989	Audiogenic Software Ltd.
Puff	1984	ESM
Puzzles	1987	NRG
Pyramid And Casino	1984	Garland Computing
Pyramid Of Doom	1984	Adventure International
Q*Bert	1983	Superior Software
Q*Bix	1986	Alligata, Unicorn Software
Q-Man	1984	MRM Software
Q-Man's Brother	1983	MRM Software
Q-Master	1991	4th Dimension
Queen Street Control		Dee-Kay Systems
Quest	1988	Superior/Acornsoft, Superior/Blue Ribbon
Quest For Freedom	1986	IJK Software
Quest For The BBC Joystick	1985	Delta 4 Software
Quest For The Holy Grail	1984	Epic Adventures
Questprobe Featuring Spider-Man	1985	Adventure International
Questprobe Featuring The Hulk	1984	Adventure International
Questprobe Featuring The Human Torch And The Thing	1986	Adventure International
Quiz Quest	1986	Alligata
Quondam	1984	Acornsoft
Qwak!	1989	Superior/Acornsoft
R.T.C. Birmingham New Street	1987	Dee-Kay Systems
R.T.C. Bristol	1992	Ashley Greenup
R.T.C. Buxton	1986	Dee-Kay Systems
R.T.C. Crewe	1987	Dee-Kay Systems
R.T.C. Doncaster	1987	Dee-Kay Systems
R.T.C. Exeter	1990	Ashley Greenup
R.T.C. Kings Cross (Ashley Greenup)	1990	Ashley Greenup
R.T.C. Kings Cross (Dee-Kay Systems)	1985	Dee-Kay Systems
R.T.C. Leeds	1989	Ashley Greenup
R.T.C. Lime Street	1985	Dee-Kay Systems
R.T.C. Manchester Piccadilly	1991	Ashley Greenup
R.T.C. Paddington	1986	Dee-Kay Systems
R.T.C. Penzance	1985	Dee-Kay Systems
R.T.C. Peterborough	1991	Ashley Greenup
Raid Over Moscow	1986	U.S. Gold
Railfreight Operations Manager Cornish China Clay	1991	Ashley Greenup
Ransack!	1987	Audiogenic Software Ltd.
Ransom	1987	Incentive
Rat Race	1985	STL
Ravage	1985	Blue Ribbon
Ravenskull	1986	Superior/Acornsoft, Superior/Blue Ribbon
Reading Station Control	1987	Dee-Kay Systems
Rebel Planet	1986	U.S. Gold, Adventure Soft UK
Red Moon	1985	Level 9 Computing
Red Skies Over Accrington	1984	Vampyre Software
Redcoats	1984	Lothlorien
Reluctant Hero	1988	Elk Adventure Club, Electron User Group
Renegade Robots	1983	Senator
Repton	1985	Superior Software, Superior/Blue Ribbon, Beau Jolly
Repton 2	1985	Superior Software, Superior/Blue Ribbon
Repton 3	1986	Superior/Acornsoft, Superior/Blue Ribbon
Repton Infinity	1988	Superior Software
Repton Thru Time	1988	Superior/Acornsoft, Superior/Blue Ribbon
Return Of Flint	1984	Potter Programs
Return Of R2	1987	Blue Ribbon
Return Of The Jedi	1988	Domark
Return Of The Warrior	1984	Larsoft
Return To Doom	1988	Topologika
Return To Eden	1984	Level 9 Computing
Revenge Of Zor:	1983	Kansas City Systems
Reversi (Computer Concepts)	1982	Computer Concepts
Reversi (Kansas City Systems)	1984	Kansas City Systems
Reversi (Micro Power)	1982	Micro Power Ltd.
Reversi (Microbyte)	1983	Microbyte
Reversi (Silverlind)	1983	Silverlind Ltd.
Reversi (Superior)	1983	Superior Software
Revs	1985	Acornsoft
Revs 4 Tracks	1985	Acornsoft
Revs Plus Revs 4 Tracks	1986	Superior/Acornsoft
Rick Hanson	1985	Robico
Ricochet	1989	Superior/Acornsoft
Rig Attack	1985	Tynesoft
Rik The Roadie	1987	Alternative Software
Road Runner	1983	Superior Software
Robin Hood	1984	Nottinghamshire Schools Computer Centre, Micro Express
Robin Of Sherwood (Adventure International)	1985	Adventure International
Robin Of Sherwood (Reflections Software)	1985	Reflections Software
Robo Brain	1985	M.G.B Software Support
Robo Swamp	1982	Software For All
Roboman	1984	Alligata
Roboto	1985	Bug-Byte
Robotron	1984	Silversoft Ltd.
Robotron: 2084	1984	Atarisoft
Rocket Raid	1982	Acornsoft, Superior/Acornsoft
Rockfall	1986	Alternative Software, Micro User, Electron User
Rocky	1983	Superior Software
Rohak The Swordsman	1988	Elk Adventure Club
Roman Empire	1982	Lothlorien, Paxman Promotions
Rome '90	1989	Qual-Soft
Roulette	1982	Micro Power Ltd.
Round Ones	1987	Alternative Software
Roundheads And Cavaliers	1986	Lothlorien, Argus Press Software
Row Of Four	1982	Software For All
Royal Quiz	1983	Acornsoft, Ivan Berg Software
Royal Scot	1984	Dee-Kay Systems
Rubble Trouble	1983	Micro Power Ltd.
Rubik Cube	1982	Computer Concepts
Sabre Wulf	1984	Ultimate Play The Game, U.S. Gold
Sadim Castle	1984	MP Software Ltd.
Saigon	1988	Tynesoft
Sailplane!	1987	Pavilion Software
Saloon Sally	1984	Psion
Samantha Fox Strip Poker	1988	Martech
Santa's Delivery	1988	Tynesoft
Saracoid	1987	Audiogenic Software Ltd.
SAS Commander	1984	Comsoft
Satan's Challenge or Nevil Rides Out	1984	Microtest Ltd.
Savage Island Part 1	1984	Adventure International
Savage Island Part 2	1984	Adventure International
Savage Pond	1984	Starcade, Bug-Byte
Scan	1983	Paean Systems
Scapeghost [picture disc]	1989	Level 9 Computing
Scapeghost [Text]	1989	Level 9 Computing
Science Fiction Quiz	1983	Acornsoft, Ivan Berg Software
Scoop	1986	British Telecom
ScotRail Class 47 Fleet Manager	1990	Ashley Greenup
ScotRail Express	1985	Dee-Kay Systems
Scrabble	1984	Leisure Genius
Scramble	1985	Swift
Screwball	1984	MRM Software
Sea Adventure	1984	Virgin Games
Sea Lord	1983	Bug-Byte
Sea Wolf	1984	Optima
Secret Mission	1984	Adventure International
Secret River	1984	Triffid Software Research
Secret Sam 1	1983	MRM Software, Blue Ribbon
Secret Sam 2	1983	MRM Software, Blue Ribbon
Secta Invaders	1983	PSS
Seek	1982	Micro Power Ltd.
Selladore Tales – Black River Quest	1991	Sherston Software
Sentinel	1983	PSS
Serpent's Lair	1984	Comsoft
Shadowfax	1984	Postern
Shanghai Warriors	1989	Players
Shark	1988	Audiogenic Software Ltd.
Shark Attack	1983	Romik
Shedmaster Bounds Green	1987	Dee-Kay Systems
Shedmaster Finsbury Park	1988	Dee-Kay Systems
Shuffle	1985	Budgie, Alligata
Shuttle	1983	Molimerx Ltd.
Shuttle Simulator	1983	Microdeal
Siege	1984	Postern
Sim	1984	Viper
Sim City	1990	Superior/Acornsoft
Sinbad	1984	Virgin Games
Sink The Bismarck	1986	Design People Software
Sir Francis Drake Adventure Game	1983	LCL
Sixers	1984	OIC
Ski Slalom	1983	R.H. Software
Skyhawk (Bug-Byte)	1986	Bug-Byte
Skyhawk (Pace)	1985	Pace
Sleigh Bells	1983	Gemini
Slicker Puzzle	1984	Dk'Tronics
Sliding Block Puzzles	1983	Acornsoft
Smash & Grab	1984	Superior Software, Superior/Blue Ribbon, Beau Jolly
Snail Trail	1983	R.H. Software
Snake (Computer Concepts)	1982	Computer Concepts
Snake (Kansas City Systems)	1983	Kansas City Systems
Snake Pit	1983	Postern
Snapper	1982	Acornsoft
Snig	1982	Computercat
Snooker (Acornsoft)	1983	Acornsoft
Snooker (Vision Software)	1983	Visions Software, Beau Jolly
Snorter	1983	Beebugsoft
Snowball	1983	Level 9 Computing
Soccer Boss	1989	Alternative Software
Soccer Supremo	1985	Qual-Soft
Solitaire	1984	MRM Software, 8-Bit Software
Son Of Blagger	1984	Alligata
Sooty'S Fun With Numbers	1991	Friendly Learning
Sorcery	1984	Pace
South Devon Hydraulics	1986	Dee-Kay Systems
South Wales Executive	1989	SRS
Southern Belle	1987	Hewson Consultants, Beau Jolly
Space Adventure	1983	Pro Software, Virgin Games
Space Adventure 1: Mission Vadros	1983	First Byte Software
Space Arena	1983	Ozark Software, Pase Software
Space Caverns	1986	Tynesoft
Space Fighter	1982	Superior Software
Space Hawks	1982	Computer Concepts
Space Hi-Way	1983	Amcom
Space Intruders	1983	Interceptor
Space Invaders (Bug-Byte)	1982	Bug-Byte
Space Invaders (Pro Software)	1982	Pro Software
Space Invaders (Superior)	1982	Superior Software
Space Jailer	1983	Micro Power Ltd.
Space Kingdom	1982	Cosma, Software For All
Space Maze	1982	Micro Power Ltd.
Space Pilot	1984	Superior Software
Space Raiders	1983	R.H. Software
Space Ranger	1986	Audiogenic Software Ltd.
Space Rescue (Alligata)	1983	Alligata
Space Shuttle Pilot	1984	Oakleaf Computers
Space Station Alpha	1984	Icon
Space Warp	1982	Bug-Byte
Spaceguard	1983	MP Software Ltd.
Spaceman Sid	1984	English Software
Spanish Gold – Part 1	1983	Chalksoft
Spanish Gold – Part 2	1983	Chalksoft
Special Operations	1984	Lothlorien, Beau Jolly
Spectapede	1984	Mastertronic
Spectipede	1984	Mastertronic
Spellbinder	1987	Superior/Acornsoft, Superior/Blue Ribbon
Sphere Of Destiny	1987	Audiogenic Software Ltd.
Sphere Of Destiny 2	1989	Audiogenic Software Ltd.
Sphinx Adventure	1982	Acornsoft
Spitfire '40	1987	Mirrorsoft, Alternative Software
Spitfire Command	1983	Superior Software
Spitfire Flight Simulator	1983	Alligata
Spooks And Spiders	1984	Software Invasion
Spooksville	1988	Blue Ribbon
Spooky Manor	1984	Acornsoft
Sporting Triangles	1989	CDS Software Ltd.
Sporting Triangles (Home Computer Club) (expansion)		CDS Software Ltd.
Spot-On Games	1988	Brilliant Computing
Springfyren	1983	Groser Data ApS
Spy Hunter	1985	U.S. Gold
Spy vs Spy	1987	Tynesoft
Spycat	1988	Superior/Acornsoft, Superior/Blue Ribbon
Squares	1986	Database Publications
Squeakaliser	1986	Bug-Byte
Squeeze	1984	Acornsoft, ASK
Staircase Stampede	1984	Comsoft
Stairway To Hell	1985	Software Invasion
Star Battle	1983	Superior Software
Star Clash	1986	Gremlin
Star Drifter	1985	Firebird Software
Star Force Seven	1983	Bug-Byte, Argus Press Software
Star Hawks	1983	Orion Software, Kay-Ess Computer Products
Star Maze	1984	Software Invasion
Star Maze II	1984	Mastertronic, Kay Dee Software
Star Port	1990	Superior/Acornsoft
Star Striker	1984	Superior Software, Beau Jolly
Star Trader	1983	First Byte Software
Star Trek (IJK) / Candyfloss	1982	IJK Software
Star Trek (Micro Power)	1982	Micro Power Ltd.
Star Trek Adventure	1983	Superior Software
Star Warp	1984	Superior Software
Star Wars	1987	Domark
Starfire	1982	Beebugsoft
Starfleet Encounter	1984	Micro Power Ltd.
Starforce Lander	1983	First Byte Software
Starquake	1987	Bubble Bus, 8-Bit Software
Starship Command	1983	Acornsoft, Superior/Acornsoft
Starship Discovery	1984	Alligata
Starship Quest	1987	Elk Adventure Club
Startrek	1983	Logic Systems, R.H. Software
Statix	1984	Psion
Steve Davis Snooker	1985	CDS Software Ltd., Blue Ribbon
Stig Of The Dump	1986	Sherston Software
Stix	1984	Supersoft, Audiogenic Software Ltd.
Stock Car	1983	Micro Power Ltd., Beau Jolly
Stock Market	1983	Argus Press Software
Stockbrokers		Forward
Storm Cycle	1989	Atlantis
Stranded	1984	Superior Software
Stranded! (Heyley)	1987	Heyley Software
Stranded! (Robico)	1989	Robico
Strange Odyssey	1984	Adventure International
Strategy I: Invasion	1983	Argus Press Software
Strategy II: Hunt For The Bismark	1983	Argus Press Software
Stratobomber	1982	IJK Software
Street Machine	1986	Software Invasion
Street Patroller	1986	Central Computing
Street Patroller Remix	1990	Central Computing
Strike Force Harrier	1985	Mirrorsoft, Beau Jolly, Alternative Software
Strip Poker II Plus	1988	Anco Software
Stryker's Run	1986	Superior/Acornsoft, Superior/Blue Ribbon
Sub Strike	1985	TDS
SubKiller	1983	Dk'Tronics
Submarine	1983	Soft Options
Submarine Simulator	1983	Anthony Gaisford Software
Subway Vigilante	1989	Players Premier
Subway Vigilante [alternative version]	1989	Players Premier
Suds	1986	Riverdale Software
Suicide Island	1984	Dollarsoft
Summer Olympiad	1988	Tynesoft, Micro Value, Superior/Acornsoft
Super 7 (Bouncer (DACC), Chopper Chase, Creatures Of The Deep, Firechief, Space Pilot Test, Space Rescue (DACC), The Guns Of Navarone)	1983	DACC
Super Fruit	1983	Dk'Tronics
Super Golf	1982	Squirrel Software
Super Gran: The Adventure	1985	Tynesoft, Electron User Group
Super Hangman	1982	IJK Software
Super Invaders	1982	Acornsoft
Super Pool	1984	Software Invasion
Super Spy Flint	1984	Potter Programs, Electron User Group
Superfruit	1983	Simonsoft
Superior Soccer	1989	Superior/Acornsoft, Superior/Blue Ribbon
SuperLife	1982	Golem
Superman: Man Of Steel	1989	Tynesoft
Superman: The Game	1987	First Star
Supermarket	1983	COIC Software
Survivor	1983	MP Software Ltd.
Swag!	1984	Micro Power Ltd., Beau Jolly
Swamp Monsters	1982	MP Software Ltd.
Swarm	1984	Computer Concepts
Swarmers' Revenge	1983	Beebugsoft
Swoop	1982	Micro Power Ltd.
Sword Master	1983	Acorn User, Micrograf
Swords And Sorcery	1984	Kansas City Systems
Syncron	1988	Superior Software, Superior/Blue Ribbon
System 15000	1984	AVS
System 8	1988	Blue Ribbon
Table Adventures	1984	Acornsoft
Tactic	1992	Superior/Acornsoft
Tales Of The Arabian Nights	1985	Interceptor, Beau Jolly
Tank Attack (CDS)	1989	CDS Software Ltd.
Tank Attack (GEM)	1983	GEM
Tanks	1986	Design People Software
Tanks!	1983	Salamander
Tapper	1985	U.S. Gold
Tarzan	1984	Alligata, Beau Jolly
Task-Force	1983	R.H. Software
Tees-Tyne Pullman	1986	Dee-Kay Systems
Tellscope	1985	Acorn User
Tempest	1985	Superior Software
Temple Of Terror	1987	U.S. Gold, Adventure Soft UK
Templeton	1986	Bug-Byte
Ten Little Indians	1983	Digital Fantasia, Channel 8 Software, Paxman Promotions, Adventure International, Molimerx Ltd.
Tennis	1986	Bug-Byte
Terrormolinos	1985	Melbourne House
Test Match	1984	Computer Rentals Ltd.
Tetrapod	1984	Acornsoft
Tetris	1987	Mirrorsoft
Thai Boxing	1986	Anco Software
Thames Local	1986	Dee-Kay Systems
The Abominable Snowmen	1984	WGames
The Adventures Of Buckaroo Banzai Across The 8th Dimension	1987	U.S. Gold, Adventure International
The Archers	1986	Mosaic Publishing Ltd., Level 9 Computing
The Atlantic Coast Express	1988	SRS
The Avaunting	1984	Ixion Software
The Axe Of Kolt	1988	Elk Adventure Club
The Banished Prince	1985	Orbit
The Big K.O.!	1987	Tynesoft
The Boss	1984	Peaksoft
The Box Of Treasures	1986	4Mation Educational Resources
The Count	1984	Adventure International
The Curse Of The Middle Kingdom	1982	Pro Software
The Dam Busters	1985	U.S. Gold
The Discovery	1984	Magic Software
The Druid's Circle	1986	Holl-Soft
The Elizabethan	1986	Dee-Kay Systems
The Empire Strikes Back	1988	Domark
The Evil Dead	1984	Palace, Beau Jolly
The Eye Of Zolton	1983	Softek
The Fall Of Rome	1984	Argus Press Software
The Feasibility Experiment	1982	Digital Fantasia, Channel 8 Software, Paxman Promotions, Adventure International, Molimerx Ltd.
The Ferryman Awaits	1985	Kansas City Systems
The Five Doctors & The Twin Dilemma	1984	W. Games
The Five Doctors And The Twin Dilemma	1984	WGames
The Five Stones Of Anadon	1983	Softek
The Four Wands	1988	D.W. Gore
The Frog (HelixSoft)	1982	HelixSoft
The Frog (Software For All)	1983	Software For All
The Genesis Project	1985	Audiogenic Software Ltd.
The Giddy Game Show	1987	Mirrorsoft
The Golden Baton	1982	Digital Fantasia, Channel 8 Software, Paxman Promotions, Adventure International, Molimerx Ltd.
The Golden Figurine	1988	Atlantis
The Golden Voyage	1984	Adventure International
The Great Wall	1986	Artic & Unicorn Software, Tynesoft
The Greedy Dwarf	1984	Goldstar
The Growing Pains Of Adrian Mole	1987	Level 9 Computing, Mosaic Publishing Ltd.
The Guy In The Hat	1984	MRM Software
The Hacker	1984	Firebird Software
The Haunted Abbey	1984	A&F Software
The Hobbit	1985	Melbourne House
The Horse Lord	1984	Century Communications Ltd.
The Hunt: Search For Shauna	1987	Robico
The Inca Treasure	1989	D.W. Gore
The Inter-City	1988	SRS
The Ket Trilogy (The Temple Of Vran, The Mountains Of Ket, The Final Mission)	1985	Incentive
The Knights Of Camelot	1985	AUCBE
The Last Ninja	1988	Superior/Acornsoft, Superior/Blue Ribbon
The Last Ninja 2	1989	Superior/Acornsoft, Superior/Blue Ribbon
The Last Of The Free	1986	Audiogenic Software Ltd., Atlantis
The Life Of Repton	1987	Superior/Acornsoft, Superior/Blue Ribbon
The Living Body	1985	Martech
The Living Daylights	1987	Domark
The Lord Of The Rings: Game One	1985	Melbourne House
The Lost Crystal	1987	Epic Adventures
The Lost Frog	1984	ESM
The Lost Slipper	1986	Jack And Jill Software, 8-Bit Software
The Mad Painter	1986	Jack And Jill Software, 8-Bit Software
The Magic Sword	1985	Database Publications
The Maze Engine	1986	Crash Barrier
The Mid-Day Scot	1986	Dee-Kay Systems
The Mine	1983	Micro Power Ltd., Beau Jolly
The Network	1986	Top Ten
The Nine Dancers	1986	Larsoft
The Pen And The Dark	1984	Mosaic Publishing Ltd.
The Perils Of Percival Penguin	1984	Willow Software
The Pieman Quins	1983	Musicsoft, Duckworth
The Pines Express	1989	SRS
The Price Of Magik	1986	Level 9 Computing
The Prophecy	1984	Larsoft
The Puppet Man	1987	Larsoft
The Purple Crystal Of The Heavens	1990	Soft Rock Software
The Quest Of Gondor	1983	Doctor Soft
The Red Arrows	1985	Database Publications, Alternative Software
The Ring Of Time	1983	Kansas City Systems
The Sacred Pyramid	1990	Soft Rock Software
The Saga Of Erik The Viking	1984	Level 9 Computing, Mosaic Publishing Ltd.
The Secret Diary Of Adrian Mole Aged 13¾	1985	Level 9 Computing, Mosaic Publishing Ltd.
The Sentinel	1988	Firebird Software, Superior/Acornsoft
The Seventh Star	1984	Acornsoft
The Shrinking Professor's Quest	1983	A&F Software
The Sorcerer Of Claymorgue Castle	1984	Adventure International
The Sorcerer's Kingdom	1983	Glengary Soft
The Staff Of Law	1984	Potter Programs, Electron User Group
The Sting	1984	Gemini
The Stolen Lamp	1983	Lothlorien, Paxman Promotions
The Survivors	1987	Atlantis
The Taroda Scheme	1987	Heyley Software
The Thames-Clyde Express	1988	SRS
The Time And Magik Trilogy	1988	Mandarin, Level 9 Computing
The Times Crossword Program: The Times Computer Crosswords Volume 1	1987	Akom
The Times Crossword Program: The Times Jubilee Puzzles 1932 to 1987	1988	Akom
The Tombs Of Arkenstone	1984	Arnold-Wheaton Software
The Twin Orbs Of Aalinor	1985	Potter Programs
The Ultimate Prize	1986	Heyley Software
The Valley	1982	Argus Press Software, Computing Today
The Way Of The Exploding Fist	1985	Melbourne House
The Way Of The Exploding Fist [Alternative version]	1985	Melbourne House, Beau Jolly, Mastertronic, Ricochet
The Weetabix Versus The Titchies	1984	Romik
The Wheel Of Fortune	1984	Epic Adventures
The White Barrows	1982	Argus Press Software, Personal Software, Computing Today
The Wizard	1982	Quicksilva
The Wizard Of Akyrz	1983	Digital Fantasia, Channel 8 Software, Paxman Promotions, Adventure International, Molimerx Ltd.
The Wizard's Challenge	1983	Micro Power Ltd.
The Wizard's Citadel	1984	Triffid Software Research
The World Travel Game	1983	Hessel
The Worm In Paradise	1985	Level 9 Computing
The Worst Witch	1988	Sherston Software
Theatre Quiz	1983	Acornsoft, Ivan Berg Software
Thrust	1986	Superior Software, Superior/Acornsoft, Superior/Blue Ribbon, Beau Jolly
Thunderball	1984	Mastertronic
Thunderstruck	1985	Audiogenic Software Ltd.
Thunderstruck II: The Mindmaster	1986	Audiogenic Software Ltd.
Time Lords	1984	Red Shift
Time Machine	1982	Digital Fantasia, Channel 8 Software, Paxman Promotions, Adventure International, Molimerx Ltd.
Time Traveller (Software for All)	1982	Software For All, Cosma
Time Traveller (Sulis Software)	1983	Sulis Software
Timetrek	1982	Micro Power Ltd.
Tomb Of Death	1986	Holl-Soft
Tomb Of Syrinx	1987	Power House
Tower Of Alos	1982	A&F Software
Towntest	1983	Silverlind Ltd.
Traditional Board Games	1984	Garland Computing
Traditional Games	1983	Gemini
Trafalgar	1983	Squirrel Software
Transistor's Revenge	1983	Softspot
Trapper	1987	Blue Ribbon
Treasure Hunt	1986	Macsen
Trek	1983	Acorn User
Trek II	1986	Tynesoft
Trench	1984	Virgin Games
Trivial Pursuit - Baby Boomer Edition	1988	Domark
Trivial Pursuit - Genus Edition	1988	Domark
Trivial Pursuit - Young Players Edition	1988	Domark
Trivial Pursuit II - A New Beginning	1989	Domark
Tudoroll	1984	J. Morrison
Turbo	1984	Kansas City Systems, 8-Bit Software
Turf-Form	1988	Blue Ribbon
Tutankhamun's Revenge	1987	Bug-Byte
Twenty Crossword Puzzles	1983	Microtrust Software
Twin Kingdom Valley	1983	Bug-Byte, Beau Jolly
Tycoon	1983	Warlock Computer Software
UIM	1989	4th Dimension
UK PM	1984	IJK Software
Ultron (Icon)	1984	Icon, Audiogenic Software Ltd.
Ultron (Viper)	1984	Viper
Uncle Claude	1984	Alligata
Uranians	1986	Bug-Byte
Uridium	1987	Hewson Consultants
US Drag Racing	1986	Tynesoft
Valley Of The Kings	1984	MP Software Ltd.
Valley Of The Pharaohs	1983	First Byte Software
Vampire Castle	1983	Acorn User, Micrograf
Vectors Maths Tutor	1984	Salamander
Vegas Jackpot	1986	Mastertronic
Vertigo	1991	Superior/Acornsoft
Video Card Arcade	1987	Blue Ribbon
Video Classics	1988	Silverbird
Video Fruit Machine	1982	Alligata
Video Pinball	1988	Alternative Software
Video's Revenge	1985	Budgie, Alligata
Village Of Lost Souls	1987	Robico, Magus
Vindaloo	1986	Tynesoft
Viper	1983	R.H. Software
Volcano	1984	Acornsoft
Voodoo Castle	1984	Adventure International
Vortex	1983	Software Invasion
W.A.R.	1986	Martech
Walk The Plank	1985	Mastertronic
Wall	1982	Micro Power Ltd.
Wall 'Em In	1982	Software For All
Wallaby	1984	Superior Software
War at Sea (Blockade, Sub Hunt)	1984	Betasoft
Warehouse	1987	Top Ten
Warlord Of Doom	1984	Visions Software
Warp-1	1984	Icon
Waterloo	1985	Lothlorien
Waxworks	1984	Digital Fantasia, Channel 8 Software, Paxman Promotions, Adventure International, Molimerx Ltd.
Web Runner	1983	Alligata
Web War	1985	Artic, Beau Jolly
Welcome Tape / Welcome Disc (Yellow River Kingdom, Bat 'n' Ball, Adventure (BBC Soft))	1981	BBC Soft
West	1984	Talent Computer Systems
Westquest	1983	Pase Software, 8-Bit Software, Ozark Software
Wet Zone	1985	Everiss Software, Tynesoft
What's Eeyore's	1986	Magus
Wheeler Dealer	1983	OIC
Where?	1982	Micro Power Ltd.
White Knight MK11	1983	BBC Soft
White Knight MK12	1984	BBC Soft
White Magic	1989	4th Dimension
White Magic 2	1989	4th Dimension
Whizz Pack 1 (Space Shapes, Runaway Rocket)	1985	Computer Rentals Ltd.
Whizz Pack 2 (Cosmic Containers, Crazy Cows)	1985	Computer Rentals Ltd.
Who Dares Wins 2	1986	Alligata
Whoopsy	1985	Shards Software
William The Conqueror	1984	Molimerx Ltd.
Winged Warlords	1984	Superior Software
Winter Olympiad '88	1988	Tynesoft, Micro Value, Superior/Acornsoft
Winter Olympics	1986	Tynesoft
Winter Wonderland	1987	Incentive
Wizadore	1985	Imagine
Wizzy's Mansion	1985	Audiogenic Software Ltd.
Woks	1986	Artic & Unicorn Software
Wolfpack III	1983	Doctor Soft
Wonder Worm	1984	Thor
Wongo	1984	Icon
Woodbury End	1985	Shards Software, Electron User Group
Woodland Terror	1983	MP Software Ltd.
Word Games With The Mr. Men	1986	Mirrorsoft
Word Mover	1985	BBC Soft
Word Square, Sea Battle, Pick-A-Pair	1984	Garland Computing
Word Worm	1983	Longman Micro Software, ITMA
Wordplay	1986	BBC Soft
World	1983	Himap
World Cup Manager	1982	Cosma, Software For All
World Geography (4Mation)	1983	4Mation Educational Resources
World Geography (Micro Power)	1982	Micro Power Ltd.
World War 1	1986	Lothlorien, Argus Press Software
Worm / Labyrinth	1982	POM Software
Wychwood	1984	Larsoft
Xadomy	1984	Brassington
Xanadu Adventure	1982	Hopesoft
Xanadu Cottage	1984	Alligata
Xanagrams	1983	Postern
XOR	1987	Logotron Recreational Products, Astral Software Limited
Yahtzee	1982	Micro Power Ltd.
Yes Prime Minister	1988	Mosaic Publishing Ltd.
Yes, Chancellor	1985	Chalksoft, Topologika
Yie Ar Kung-Fu	1985	Imagine, Hit Squad
Yie Ar Kung-Fu II	1986	Imagine
Yoyo!	1985	Top Ten, Fast Access
Zalaga	1983	Aardvark, Beau Jolly, Alternative Software, ProAction
Zany Kong	1983	Solar Soft
Zany Kong Junior	1984	Superior Software
Zarm	1983	Micro Power Ltd.
Zelda Meets The Bug Eyes	1985	Icon
Zenon	1988	Impact
Ziggy	1987	Audiogenic Software Ltd.
Zombie Island	1982	Software For All
Zombies	1982	Micro Power Ltd.
Zorakk The Conqueror	1985	Icon
