= Bomb Alley (disambiguation) =

Bomb Alley is a computer game. Bomb Alley may also refer to

- 1942 Operation Vigorous
- 1982 Battle of San Carlos during the Falklands War
- 3D Bomb Alley, a computer game
- Bomb Alley, part one of the 2011 limited series Butcher, Baker, Candlestickmaker by Garth Ennis and Darick Robertson
