= Bonecrusher =

Bonecrusher may refer to:

- Bone crusher, a machine used to crush animal bones
- Bonecrusher (horse), a New Zealand racehorse
- Bonecrusher (Transformers), a robot supervillain in the Transformers robot superhero franchise.
- Bone Crusher (rapper) (born 1971), American rapper
- James Smith (boxer) (born 1953), American boxer nicknamed Bonecrusher
- "Bonecrusher", a song by American rock band Soulhat

== See also ==
- Bonebreaker, a Marvel Comics super villain
- Bone Cruncher, a 1987 video game
