= The Secret River (disambiguation) =

The Secret River is a 2005 historical novel by Australian author Kate Grenville.

The Secret River may also refer to:

== Related to the novel by Grenville ==
- The Secret River (play), a 2013 play by Andrew Bovell
- The Secret River (TV series), a 2015 television series

== Other uses ==
- The Secret River (Rawlings book), a 1955 children's book by Marjorie Kinnan Rawlings
- The Secret River (video game), a 1984 video game
- The Secret River, or Secret Love, a 2010 South Korean film
