= Blue Ribbon (software house) =

Former video game publisher

Blue Ribbon Software
- Genre: Video game publisher
- Founded: 1985
- Defunct: 1991
- Headquarters: Doncaster, South Yorkshire, UK

Blue Ribbon was the budget computer software publishing label of CDS Micro Systems.

The label launched in 1985 mostly made up of games from the MRM Software back catalogue. MRM had been a label producing games for the BBC Micro and Acorn Electron. Blue Ribbon reissued these and also converted them to other platforms including Atari 8-bit, Amstrad CPC, MSX and Commodore 16/Plus/4. By the late 80s, Blue Ribbon were also releasing games for the ZX Spectrum and Commodore 64 including reissues of games for publishers including Superior Software, Bubble Bus and Artic as well as games originally published at full price by CDS. This included the first stand alone releases for games previously only available on compilations (e.g. Syncron and Camelot from Superior and Video Card Arcade and Dominoes from CDS). The Superior games were released as joint Superior/Blue Ribbon releases and carried advertisements for current Superior full price games. Although a small number of compilations were released on disk, all individual releases were on cassette between £1.99 and £2.99. The label's final releases were in 1991 and CDS never used the Blue Ribbon label for 16-bit releases.

== Releases ==
=== Original releases ===
- Astro Plumber (BBC, Electron, CPC, C16, MSX)
- Bar Billiards (BBC, Electron)
- Condition Red (BBC, Electron)
- Diamond Mine II (BBC, Electron, CPC, C16/Plus/4, MSX)
- Joey (BBC, Electron, C16)
- Ravage (BBC, Electron)
- M-Droid (MSX)
- Trapper (BBC, Electron)
- Return of R2 (BBC, Electron)
- Mango (BBC, Electron)
- 3D Dotty (BBC, Electron)
- Spooksville (BBC, Electron)
- System 8: The Pools Predictor (BBC, Electron, Atari, CPC, C16, C64, ZX, MSX)
- Turf-Form: Beat the Bookie (BBC, Electron, Atari, CPC, C16, C64, ZX, MSX)
- Hi-Q-Quiz (BBC, Electron, CPC, C64, ZX)
- Syntax (CPC, C64, ZX)
- Wulfpack (CPC, C64, ZX)
- Balloon Buster (BBC, Electron, CPC)

=== Reissues and ports ===
==== MRM Software ====
- 3D Munchy / Hangman (BBC)
- Banana Man / Secret Sam 1 (BBC)
- Guy In The Hat / Secret Sam 2 (BBC)
- Castle Assault (BBC, Electron, Atari, CPC)
- Darts (BBC, Electron, Atari, CPC, C64, ZX, MSX)
- Diamond Mine (BBC, Electron, Atari, CPC, C16)
- Q Man (BBC)
- Q Man's Brother (BBC)
- Screwball (BBC, Atari, CPC)
- Artist (a.k.a. Artmaster) (BBC, CPC)
- Nightmare Maze (BBC, Electron, Atari, CPC)

==== CDS Software ====
- Caterpillar / Leapfrog (ZX)
- Gobble a Ghost / 3D Painter (ZX)
- Spectrum Safari / Winged Warlords (ZX)
- Timebomb / Magic Meanies (ZX)
- Pool (CPC, ZX)
- Video Card Arcade (BBC, Electron, CPC, C64, ZX) - previously only available as part of The Complete Home Entertainment Centre
- Golf (BBC, Electron) - reissue of Birdie Barrage
- Steve Davis Snooker (BBC, Electron, Atari, CPC, C16, C64, ZX, MSX)
- Dominoes (BBC, Electron, CPC, ZX) - previously only available as part of The Complete Home Entertainment Centre

==== Bubble Bus Software ====
- The Ice Temple (CPC, C64, ZX)
- Wizard's Lair (CPC, C64, ZX, MSX)
- Moonlight Madness (ZX)
- Cave Fighter (C16, C64)

==== Artic Computing ====
- Rugby (ZX) - reissue of International Rugby

==== Artworx ====
- Ice Hockey (C64) - reissue of International Hockey
- Strip Poker (C64)

==== Superior Software ====
- Repton (BBC, Electron)
- Karate Combat (BBC, Electron)
- Percy Penguin (BBC, Electron)
- Mr Wiz (BBC, Electron)
- Stryker's Run (BBC, Electron)
- Citadel (BBC, Electron)
- DeathStar (BBC, Electron)
- Smash and Grab (BBC, Electron)
- Repton 2 (BBC, Electron)
- Thrust (BBC, Electron)
- Ravenskull (BBC, Electron)
- Galaforce (BBC, Electron)
- Codename: Droid (BBC, Electron)
- Crazee Rider (BBC, Electron)
- Syncron (BBC, Electron) - previously only available on a Superior Collection compilation
- Repton Around The World (BBC, Electron) - reissue of Around the World in 40 Screens
- Palace of Magic (BBC, Electron)
- Elixir (BBC, Electron)
- The Life of Repton (BBC, Electron)
- Spellbinder (BBC, Electron)
- Quest (BBC, Electron)
- Spycat (BBC, Electron)
- Repton Thru Time (BBC, Electron)
- Pipeline (BBC, Electron)
- Barbarian (BBC, Electron)
- Repton 3 (BBC, Electron)
- Bonecruncher (BBC, Electron)
- Bug Blaster (BBC, Electron) - originally an Alligata game that had featured on a Superior compilation
- Camelot (BBC, Electron) - previously only available on a Play It Again Sam compilation
- Galaforce 2 (BBC, Electron) - previously only available on a Play It Again Sam compilation
- Barbarian II (BBC, Electron)
- The Last Ninja (BBC, Electron)
- Predator (BBC, Electron)
- Ballistix (BBC, Electron)
- Superior Soccer (BBC, Electron)
