= Bun Fun =

1983 video game

- Developer(s): A. J. Turner
- Publisher(s): Squirrel
- Platform(s): BBC Micro, Acorn Electron
- Release: 1983
- Genre(s): Action
- Mode(s): Single-player

Bun Fun is a video game written by A.J. Turner for the BBC Micro home computer and published by Squirrel Software on cassette in 1983 It was later ported to the Acorn Electron.

== Gameplay ==
In the game, the player manages a production line. A number of buns sit on a conveyor belt and, by rhythmic tapping of two keys on the computer, the player decorates them with icing, sugar and walnuts to produce a 'gudbun'. The more gudbuns the player produces, the more wages that player earns.
