= Spycat =

1988 video game

- Publishers: Superior Software; Acornsoft
- Designer: Peter Scott (as Dylan)
- Platforms: Acorn Electron, BBC Micro
- Release: 1988
- Genre: Action-adventure
- Mode: Single-player

Spycat: An Interactive Exposé of M.I.4 1/2 is an action-adventure game for the BBC Micro and Acorn Electron, written by Peter Scott (under the pseudonym Dylan) and published by Superior Software in 1988. The game is a parody of the scandal surrounding the Spycatcher book.

== Gameplay ==
Acorn Electron screenshot showing the opening screen in Blackhall (the game's version of Whitehall)

Spycat is loosely based on the then current scandal surrounding the release of Spycatcher, the memoirs of former MI5 officer and Assistant Director Peter Wright. The player takes the role of the Spycat, Peter Correct, who has worked for M.I.4 1/2 for fifty years but finds out he is to be forced to retire with a low pension. The player must collect classified research documents (among other items), then flee to Greenland to write his memoirs. Other characters found in the game include Sir Clive Amstrad (an amalgamation of Clive Sinclair and Alan Sugar) as technical expert "Q" and the Prime Minister Margo Thatch (Margaret Thatcher).

The game takes the form of an arcade adventure with the player moving through a series of locations and rooms, collecting and using items to progress. The player must avoid CCTV cameras and "Q"'s electronic devices that will drain Spycat's energy. The actions in the game (e.g. picking up and using items, opening doors) are controlled using an icon panel at the top of the screen.

== Development and release ==
Author Peter Scott completed the game while still under exclusive contract to Audiogenic. Unhappy with their promotion of his games, he offered Spycat to Superior Software who wanted to publish it. Scott needed to give twelve months notice to get out of the deal with Audiogenic so Spycat (and other games he released in 1988) had to be credited only to the pseudonym Dylan. It became the first of ten full price games Scott created for Superior between 1988 and 1990.

The game was released in 1988 by Superior Software on cassette for the Acorn Electron and BBC Micro as well as 5.25" floppy disk for the BBC Micro and 3.5" disk for the Master Compact.

== Reception ==
Electron User gave the game an overall score of 7/10 with reviewer Chris Nixon finding the icon control panel "tiresome" and "unwieldy" but this is his "only complaint in an otherwise excellent game". He concludes: "Spycat is an excellent arcade adventure with a strong vein of humour underlying all the action".

== Legacy ==
Spycat was included on the Play It Again Sam 9 compilation in 1989 and was reissued as part of the Superior / Blue Ribbon budget range in 1990.
