= Elixir (video game) =

1987 video game

- Developers: Richard Williams, John Llewellyn, Chris Hyde
- Publisher: Superior Software
- Platforms: Acorn Electron, BBC Micro
- Release: 1987
- Genre: Platform
- Mode: Single-player

Elixir is a video game for the Acorn Electron and BBC Micro released in 1987 by Superior Software. It is a platform game in which the player takes the role of a shrunken scientist.

== Plot ==
Laboratory's shelves, navigated by Cyril to the lower right (BBC Micro)

The story follows a scientist, named Cyril, who accidentally manages to shrink himself. In order to restore him to his normal size the player has to navigate their way around the laboratory, collecting vitamin pills and finding the elixir of the title.

== Release ==
The game was released in 1987 for the Acorn Electron and BBC Micro on a wide variety of media. It was available on cassette and 5.25" DFS floppy disk as well as ADFS 3.5" disk for the Acorn Electron Plus 3 and Master Compact. It was included on the Play It Again Sam 5 compilation in 1988 and also re-released in 1990 as part of the Superior/Blue Ribbon budget range.

== Reception ==
Elixir was not as widely praised as other Superior releases. When reviewing the PIAS 5 compilation, Electron User found the game lacking compared to the "superb" Imogen (also on the compilation), saying "Elixir is an arcade adventure that originates from the opposite end of the quality spectrum". Acorn User said that "the logical puzzles are well thought out... and give players something to get their teeth into".
