= Diamond Mine (video game) =

1984 video game

- Developer: Mike Williams
- Publishers: MRM Software; Blue Ribbon
- Platforms: Acorn Electron, Amstrad CPC, Atari 8-bit, BBC Micro, Commodore 16 / Plus/4
- Release: 1984
- Genre: Maze
- Mode: Single-player

Diamond Mine is a maze video game first published by MRM Software for the Acorn Electron and BBC Micro in 1984. Diamond Mine was reissued by Blue Ribbon in 1985 and ported to other systems in 1985 and 1986. Blue Ribbon released a sequel, Diamond Mine II, at the same time. Both games are similar to the 1983 game Oil's Well, which itself is a re-themed version of the 1982 Anteater arcade video game.

== Gameplay ==
Electron version

The aim of the game is to guide a pipe through a maze-like mine to collect diamonds while avoiding hitting the walls or the patrolling monsters. The player has a set length of pipe for each level. Once the pipe has started moving, it cannot stop and if it is retracted, that section of pipe is lost. If the pipe is hit by a monster or hits a wall, twice the amount of pipe is lost. Diamonds are placed sporadically in the maze and there is no way to kill the monsters.

== Legacy ==
Diamond Mine II (Plus/4 enhanced version)

In 1985, Blue Ribbon published a sequel from the same programmer, Diamond Mine II. The screen layout is even closer to Anteater than the original. The pipe can pause, can be retracted at any time without penalty and the walls cannot be hit. The monsters can be killed by touching them with the end of the pipe and they do not move while the pipe is being retracted. The maze is also populated by regular diamonds which more resemble the dots in a Pac-Man maze.
