= 3D Dotty =

1987 video game

- Publisher: Blue Ribbon
- Designer: J.L. Harris
- Platforms: BBC Micro, Electron
- Release: 1987
- Genre: Maze
- Mode: Single-player

3D Dotty is a maze video game written by J.L. Harris and published by Blue Ribbon for the Acorn Electron and BBC Micro home computers in 1987. Each screen consists of vertically stacked mazes connected by ladders. The goal is to collect all of the dots while avoiding a fungus.

== Gameplay ==
Contact with the fungus reduces energy, and a life is lost when the energy reaches zero. The fungus can be blocked, but only three blocks are permitted at any one time. On completing a screen bonus points are given proportional to the amount of energy remaining. Extra lives are awarded when the score reaches 5,000 and 10,000 points.

There are eight different screens. After the eighth, the screens are repeated, but energy is reduced by two units upon contact with the fungus. A practice mode allows trying any of the screens.
