= Camelot (video game) =

1989 video game

- Cassette cover
- Developer(s): Tony Oakden
- Publisher(s): Superior Software; Blue Ribbon; Acornsoft
- Platform(s): Acorn Electron; BBC Micro
- Release: 1989: Play it Again Sam 9 compilation 1990: Standalone
- Genre(s): Platform, action-adventure
- Mode(s): Single-player

Camelot is a computer game written by Tony Oakden and published in the UK in 1989/90 for the BBC Micro and Acorn Electron. The game was first published by Superior Software and Acornsoft as part of the Play it Again Sam 9 compilation in 1989 and was subsequently re-published as a standalone title in 1990 by Superior Software and Blue Ribbon.

== Description ==
In-game screenshot (BBC Micro)

The game is very similar to Oakden's previous game Quest which itself has some elements in common with an earlier BBC/Electron title, Citadel. Camelot is also a platform adventure game set in a large flip-screen castle and the player also has a set amount of energy which runs down when in contact with enemy sprites or hazards.

The backstory given in the cassette inlay indicates that the player (as the King) has been deposed from the throne for mismanaging the kingdom. To convince the people that the king deserves another chance to return to throne again, the player must fight their way through the castle and surrounding terrain, facing various enemies such as witches, warlocks and soldiers. To complete the quest, 3000 points are needed, which can be obtained by finding six bags of gold, scattered around the game. Each bag is worth 450 points, although the player can gain extra points by killing the enemy sprites.

The player has four-way directional controls, left, right, up and down (for climbing ladders) and there are also separate keys for jump, firing a fireball, picking up objects and using a spell book. Energy can be replenished by finding hearts hidden in caskets, although some caskets contain daemons instead, which drain the player's energy. The game does have a time limit, but extra time is gained by opening doors and solving puzzles, so the player must work out a logical sequence of puzzle-solving such that the clock does not run down to zero.

The game is considered quite challenging, although a small program has been written by C.J. Richardson which enables POKEs for various cheat modes such as infinite time and energy, big jumps and climb anywhere.

== Reception ==
In the Electron User review of the Play It Again Sam 9 compilation, Camelot received a glowing review with main reviewer Jon Revis concluding "first rate graphics and difficult gameplay make Camelot a suitable challenge for even the most accomplished arcade adventurers" and in his second opinion, Roland Waddilove said "forget the other games - they can be considered freebies - the main attraction is Camelot. I loved it".

Crispin Boylan's review of Camelot praises the graphics as "good" and the colours as "nice and bright" but also states that the game's plot is "a bit thin on the ground" and the animation is not really up the standard of contemporary titles. He also notes that the game has some "beeps" but that there is no in-game music.
