= 3D Bomb Alley =

1984 video game

- Publisher: Software Invasion
- Designer: Simon Vout
- Platforms: BBC Micro, Acorn Electron
- Release: 1984
- Genre: Shooter
- Modes: Single player, multiplayer

3D Bomb Alley is a video game developed by Simon Vout and published in 1984 by Software Invasion for the BBC Micro and Acorn Electron. It is based on the 1982 Battle of San Carlos in the Falklands War when San Carlos Water became known as "Bomb Alley".

== Gameplay ==
A static background is displayed of a sea inlet, looking out to sea with hills on either side, on which the player's ships and enemy aircraft are superimposed. The player controls an anti-aircraft cannon, located at his or her point of view, with a crosshair on the screen.

Aircraft approach in perspective, starting as dots in the distance and increasing in apparent size and speed until they pass overhead or are shot down. Each aircraft allowed to reach the inlet drops a bomb into the water, destroying one of the ships. The player starts with three vessels and gains another for every ten aircraft hit. Their turn ends when the last remaining ship is bombed. The number of aircraft approaching at once is proportional to the size of the fleet in the inlet.

== Reception ==
Electron User magazine said players must have quick reactions to be successful at the game. The plane exploding animations on the Election version are in magenta and green. This can lead to reviewers erroneously thinking the game was using graphics designed for 3D glasses.
