= The Secret River (video game) =

1984 video game

- Publisher: Triffid Software Research
- Release: 1984
- Genre: Adventure

The Secret River is a 1984 video game published by Triffid Software Research.

== Gameplay ==
The Secret River is an adventure game in the Runemagic series, with approximately 64 locations.

== Reception ==
Mike White reviewed The Secret River for White Dwarf #63, giving it an overall rating of 8 out of 10, and stated that "A few tips: read messages as they are punctuated; stay cool when amazed; beware resurrection; go through unseen exits; trust in the Lord; and remember valour."
