= Syncron (video game) =

1987 video game

- Publishers: Superior Software; Blue Ribbon
- Designer: Gary Partis
- Platforms: Acorn Electron; BBC Micro
- Release: EU: 1987
- Genre: Scrolling shooter
- Mode: Single-player

Syncron is a vertically scrolling shooter written by Gary Partis for the BBC Micro and Acorn Electron and published by Superior Software in 1987.

== Overview ==
Acorn Electron screenshot. The player is heading down the screen and has just passed a tall building.

The player must collect a number of orbs by first blasting off their covers, then flying over them to pick them up before depositing them by landing on a runway. They must also destroy alien spacecraft and targets on the scrolling landscape to obtain a set number of points before proceeding to the enemy headquarters and destroying that to move on to the next level.

The game vertically scrolls, with the player being able to change direction at any time, but not change speed. The landscape loops with the player being able to reach the bottom by travelling up far enough, and vice versa. The game is incredibly fast and smooth scrolling (particularly for the Acorn Electron which lacks hardware scrolling ability), and the author once stated that he designed Syncron as an exercise in pure speed rather than playability. The levels feature tall buildings that need to be avoided. As the scrolling is so fast, the player must learn the layout of the level to avoid these hazards.

== Release ==
The game was first released in 1987 as the lead game on The Superior Collection compilations (vol. 1 for the BBC Micro, vol. 3 for the Electron). It was eventually given its own release as part of the Superior Software / Blue Ribbon budget series in 1989. This version uses cover-art also used on the similar Blue Ribbon game Syntax (for Amstrad CPC, Commodore 64 and ZX Spectrum).
