= The Dungeon (1993 video game) =

- Cover art (Acorn Archimedes)
- Developers: Martin Dennett, John Parker, David Postlethwaite, Gordon J. Key
- Publisher: The Fourth Dimension
- Platform: Acorn Archimedes
- Release: 1993
- Genres: First-person, Role-playing
- Mode: Single player

The Dungeon is a single-player real-time role-playing video game featuring a 3D first-person perspective with texture mapping. It was published by The Fourth Dimension for the Acorn Archimedes home computer in 1993.

== Plot ==
You control a team of four adventurers (Anthea, Helena, Horace and Moroth) as they attempt to escape the multi-level dungeon they have fallen into.

Along the way they must explore, fight creatures, cast spells, solve puzzles, avoid traps, pick up useful objects such as food and weaponry and gather as much treasure as they can carry.

== Gameplay ==
The gameplay is very similar to previous dungeon-based video games such as Dungeon Master

== Reviews ==
The BBC Acorn User magazine games review of 1993/94 listed The Dungeon at number 37 in the Top 100 Games. Summary: "Dungeon is like Gauntlet but in stunning 3D."

BBC Acorn User magazine reviewed The Dungeon in their October 1993 edition. Summary: "To spend so much effort on a smooth and well-coded game, then spoil it with poor graphics is sadly an all-too-familiar scenario. Despite this, the game has been put together skilfully. And as Dungeon is the only real role player available on the Arc, this one has to be a must for anyone into adventure games."

Acorn Computing magazine reviewed The Dungeon in their October 1993 edition. Summary: "The Dungeon is a really entertaining introduction to roleplaying games on the 32-bit machine and the gameplay is superb. It's a pity that the excellent smooth scrolling background graphics are let down by inferior sprites. But it's early days. In theatrical terms: It's a cracking play with a great plot and some superb scenery. Shame about the cast."

Acorn Archimedes World magazine reviewed The Dungeon in their October 1993 edition. Summary: Graphics 81%, Sound 62%, Gameplay 86%, Overall 84%.

Micro Computer Mart magazine reviewed The Dungeon in a 1993 edition. Summary: "I am very satisfied with quality and appeal of this game. The scope is immense, the details magnanimous and the value for money extraordinary. For just £34.95 you are getting a first class game from a first class software house. This one comes highly recommended."

== Technical ==
The Dungeon was supplied on three 3.5-inch floppy disks.

The Dungeon ran on Acorn Archimedes computers with at least 2 MB of RAM installed.

The Dungeon ran on ARM2 processor machines at up to 12.5 frames per second and on ARM3 machines at up to 25 frames per second.

The Dungeon used triple screen buffering.
