= Dan Pedoe =

Dan Pedoe may refer to:

- Daniel Pedoe (1910–1998), English-born mathematician and geometer
- Dan Tunstall Pedoe (1939–2015), cardiologist
