= Apocalypse (1990 video game) =

- Developer: Gordon J. Key
- Publisher: The Fourth Dimension
- Designer: Gordon J. Key
- Platform: Acorn Archimedes (RISC OS)
- Release: 1990
- Genre: Shoot 'em up
- Mode: Single-player

Apocalypse is a futuristic 3D space shoot 'em up game released in 1990 for the Acorn Archimedes written by Gordon J. Key and published by The Fourth Dimension.

In 1993 Acorn User magazine published a list of its top 100 games, with Apocalypse featuring at number 56.

== Plot ==
Sometime in the future, computers have evolved into sentient, mobile life-forms known as 'Rakonans'. They then proceed to conquer numerous planets, depleting the natural resources until nothing is left, and then swarming in a locust-like fashion to the next planet. The consequence of this is that humans then enter into conflict with the Rakonans in order to survive.

The game sees the player acting as a Llanerk (a type of assault aircraft in the form of a flying saucer) pilot for the 'Royal Guild of Spacing'. During the course of the game, nine planets must be 'sterilised' by removing a set number of Rakonan units.

Apocalypse is notable for the extremely high review scores awarded by The Micro User, and was only the second game on the Archimedes to feature fast, realtime true 3D polygon graphics (the first being David Braben's Zarch (1988), published by Superior Software).
