= Evi (software) =

Software company of the United Kingdom

Evi (formerly True Knowledge)
- Company type: Private
- Website type: Answer Engine
- Available in: English
- Headquarters: Cambridge, England
- Founder: William Tunstall-Pedoe
- Industry: Internet
- Products: Evi, Amazon Alexa
- Parent: Amazon.com, Inc.
- Website: evi.com
- Registration: Yes
- Launched: 7 November 2007; 18 years ago
- Current status: Beta

Evi (formerly True Knowledge) is a technology company in Cambridge, England, founded by William Tunstall-Pedoe, which specialises in knowledge base and semantic search engine software. Its first product was an answer engine that aimed to directly answer questions on any subject posed in plain English text, which is accomplished using a database of discrete facts. The True Knowledge Answer engine was launched for private beta testing and development on 7 November 2007.

In January 2012 True Knowledge launched a major new product Evi (pronounced ee-vee), an artificial intelligence program which can be communicated with using natural language via an app on iPhone and Android.

The company changed its name from True Knowledge to Evi in June 2012.

In October 2012, Evi was acquired by Amazon and is now part of the Amazon group of companies. The technology and team became a key part of Amazon Alexa assistant (debuting with the Amazon Echo).

== Core technology premise ==
The True Knowledge Answer Engine attempts to comprehend posed questions by disambiguating from all possible meanings of the words in the question to find the most likely meaning of the question being asked. It does this by drawing upon its database of knowledge of discrete facts. As these facts are stored in a form that the computer can understand, the answer engine attempts to produce an answer to what it comprehends to be the question by logically deducing from them.

For example, if one were to type in "What is the birth date of George W. Bush?", True Knowledge would reason from the facts "George W. Bush is a president", "George W. Bush is a human being", "A president is a subclass of human being", "Date of creation is a more general form for birth date", and "the 6th of July is the date of creation for George W. Bush", to produce the simple answer, "the 6th of July". True Knowledge differs from competitors like Freebase and DBpedia in that they offer natural language access. Unlike the others however, users who post information to True Knowledge granted the company a "non-exclusive, irrevocable, perpetual licence to use such information to operate this website and for any other purposes".

== Knowledge accumulation and verification ==
Evi gathers information for its database in two ways: importing it from "credible" external databases (which for them includes Wikipedia) and from user submission following a consistent format and detailed process for input. True Knowledge strives to monitor this user submitted knowledge in multiple ways.

One method involves a system of checks and balances in some ways similar to Wikipedia's, allowing users to modify or "agree"/"disagree" with information presented by True Knowledge. The system itself also assesses submitted information due to the fact that the information is submitted as discrete facts that computers can understand. The system is able to reject any facts that are semantically incompatible with other approved knowledge. On 21 November 2008, True Knowledge announced on its official blog that over 100,000 facts had been added by beta users and as of August 2010, the True Knowledge database overall contained 283,511,156 facts about 9,237,091 things.

In November 2010, True Knowledge used some 300 million facts to calculate that Sunday, 11 April 1954, was the most boring day since 1900.

== Financing ==
On 7 May 2007, True Knowledge Ltd. announced it would be "actively seeking investments following several years of internally-funded development". Then, on 17 September 2007, Octopus Ventures, a British venture capitalist firm, announced its investment of more than $1.2 million into True Knowledge, the first significant investment into the company, allowing it to further develop its website and achieve critical milestones towards bringing the True Knowledge Answer Engine to market. On 30 July 2008, True Knowledge announced it had raised another $4 million in a second round of funding from Octopus Ventures and other investors that would be used towards expanding its staff, developing new products, and moving towards a rollout within 12 months.

Evi was purchased by Amazon in 2013, which created speculation about Amazon building its own smartphone.

== Evi app ==
Evi was launched to the public in January 2012 through the iTunes App Store and Android Marketplace (now rebranded as Google Play). The following month, Apple initially threatened to pull Evi from its App Store for being too similar to its own product Siri, but allowed it to remain in the App Store.

Evi is a cloud-based Artificial Intelligence (AI) which builds upon the core semantic search technology developed by the company and adds conversation, external APIs, location sensitivity and other features. Users can talk to Evi via an iPhone and Android app. Voice is supported. The company calls this "conversational search".

In May an update was released on both Android and iOS that introduced voice controls for phone, SMS, and Email. This was announced as the first phase of phone control updates which are planned to add further functionality and deeper integration with device features.

== See also ==
- Cortana
- Cyber Chess
- Cyc
- IVONA
- Wolfram Alpha
- YAGO (database)
- Yap (company)
