= William Tunstall-Pedoe =

British AI entrepreneur (born 1969)

William Tunstall-Pedoe FREng
- Born: 29 January 1969 (age 57)
- Citizenship: British
- Education: Cambridge University
- Awards: FREng
- Scientific career
- Fields: Artificial Intelligence
- Workplaces: Evi; Amazon; UnlikelyAI; Amazon Alexa; Acorn Computers; Isaac Newton Institute
- Website: www.williamtp.com

William Tunstall-Pedoe (born 29 January 1969) is a British entrepreneur and computer scientist whose primary field of expertise is Artificial Intelligence. He was the founder and CEO of Evi (formerly True Knowledge), a pioneering voice assistant, semantic search and question answering startup, and following the acquisition of Evi by Amazon was a key member of the team that built and launched Amazon Alexa.

Tunstall-Pedoe is currently the founder and CEO of UnlikelyAI, a British start-up focused on producing safe, general intelligence using neuro-symbolic methods.

== Early life and family ==
In 1969, Tunstall-Pedoe was born into a family of medical professionals in Dulwich.

Tunstall-Pedoe is the son of Hugh Tunstall-Pedoe and nephew of Dan Tunstall-Pedoe, and the grandson of the mathematician Daniel Pedoe, and the great nephew of Colditz escapee Pete Tunstall.

In 1982, when he was 13 years old, Tunstall-Pedoe moved to Scotland, where he wrote commercial software for a business run by the computer teacher while at the High School of Dundee. He subsequently studied computer science at Churchill College, Cambridge.

== Career ==
Tunstall-Pedoe has been an angel investor and advisor to numerous startup companies, including working as a fellow at Creative Destruction Lab at the Rotman School of Management and Said Business School.

In 2010 Tunstall-Pedoe's engine Evi calculated that Sunday, 11 April 1954, was the most boring day in history.

=== The Da Vinci Code and anagrams ===
Tunstall-Pedoe created an AI anagram generated application called Anagram Genius that turned any text into relevant anagrams. Dan Brown used the software to create the anagrams that were integral to the plot of The Da Vinci Code novel and his name appears in the acknowledgements in the book. The same anagrams were used in the film The Da Vinci Code.

=== AI chess ===
In 1993, at just 24 years of age, Tunstall-Pedoe developed "Cyber Chess", which was published by the Fourth Dimension. It was an early commercial chess-playing program where the weights were tuned with a Genetic Algorithm.
