= Powerband (video game) =

1990 video game

- Developer: Gordon J. Key
- Publisher: The Fourth Dimension
- Designer: Gordon J. Key
- Platform: Acorn Archimedes (RISC OS)
- Release: 1990
- Genre: Racing
- Mode: Single player

Powerband is a Formula 1-style racing game for the Acorn Archimedes published in 1990. It was written by Gordon J. Key and published by The Fourth Dimension. The game was released on a single 3.5" floppy disk.

== Gameplay ==
The game involves racing against 11 AI cars around circuits for a set number of laps (between 1 and 99), aiming to finish ahead of as many as possible. All cars are of the same generic design but feature differing simple colour schemes. As the game was unlicensed driver names were created for the game, based on puns (Ali Rimms, Terbie Blower, Cruncher Gears, Torson Barrs, Eeza Weaver, Wilson Phyre), though actual circuits were used. The game has three modes - Fun, Race and Championship. The former allows racing with any permutation of laps, car modifications, invincibility etc., while the latter has a set series of races with a points-scoring system. Race mode effectively creates a non-championship race. Colliding with another car will penalise the player in that his car will stand still for a few seconds and the rival will continue; colliding with a barrier head-on on either Race or Championship modes will result in the destruction of the player's car. Limited mechanical failures are also incorporated into the game, as is tyre wear - while the game features no pit stops choosing soft compound tyres for a long race will result in a loss of grip.

The car has a limited number of modification options, including engine size, tyre type, gearbox type, steering ratio, wing positioning etc. Some of these options - such as "Va-Voom" engines, Pythonesque steering (which makes the car do the opposite to the gamer's mouse movements) and limpet tyres are only available on Fun mode. The game features no testing/practice option, with grid positions chosen at random and the Fun mode intended for learning of circuits. The game's pause screen features a track map informing the player of his position and those of the other cars.

While the game was unlicensed it featured primitive recreations of numerous circuits used for Formula 1 races, including Monaco, Silverstone, Brands Hatch, Hockenheim, Paul Ricard, Adelaide, Detroit, Suzuka, Spa, the Hungaroring, Montreal, Buenos Aires, Interlagos - plus Wellington in New Zealand. Twelve of the sixteen featured circuits will be chosen at random and in a random order for a championship season.

== Controls ==
As with E-Type the player controls the car using the mouse. The three Acorn mouse buttons represent (from left) the Clutch, Brake and Accelerator. This adds to the "realism" of the game as this corresponds to the typical layout of the car's foot pedals. Keyboard keys are used for gear changes (in Manual or Electronic gearbox mode).
