= Galactic Dan =

1992 video game

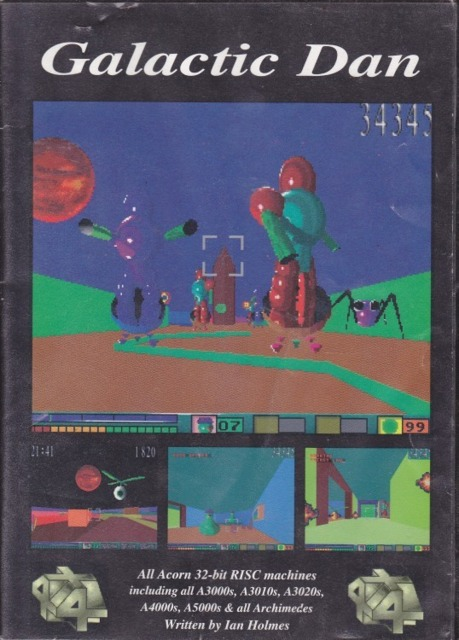
- Publisher(s): The Fourth Dimension (company)
- Designer(s): Ian Holmes, James Davidson
- Platform(s): Acorn Archimedes
- Release: 1992
- Genre(s): First-person shooter
- Mode(s): Single-player

Galactic Dan is a video game for the Acorn Archimedes, originally published by The Fourth Dimension (company) in 1992. It is a first-person shooter set in space.

== Gameplay ==
The game is a fast first-person shooter featuring ray-traced sprites and sampled sound effects. The player runs and jumps around a 3D maze of walls and platforms, rescuing hostages while avoiding or shooting robots on hoverboards, and solving simple puzzles.

== Reception ==
The game was positively reviewed by Acorn User and ARM Club magazine, the latter calling it "a fast moving vector style game, featuring some stunning ray traced graphics... turns out to be the best thing I have seen from 4th Dimension in ages - great fun!"

Galactic Dan was a state-of-the-art first-person shooter for the time, but was eclipsed by Wolfenstein 3D which was released around the same time.
