= Cyber Chess =

1993 video game

- Developer: William Tunstall-Pedoe
- Publisher: The Fourth Dimension
- Platform: Acorn Archimedes
- Release: 1993
- Genre: Chess

Cyber Chess is a chess-playing computer program developed by William Tunstall-Pedoe. It was written for the Acorn Archimedes and published commercially by The Fourth Dimension.

== Development ==
Evaluation of moves was tuned by use of a genetic algorithm.

== Gameplay ==
The game provides play against another human or the computer (at various levels of difficulty). Saved games and graphics export as vector Drawfiles are supported.

== Reception ==
In Acorn User's games review of 1993/94, Cyber Chess was listed number 55 in the Best 100 Games. The game was well received by the magazines Acorn Computing and Archimedes World, but the retail price of £35 was criticised by The Icon Bar in an article about the marketing of RISC OS games.
