= Treasure Truck =

Free subscription-based service offered to Amazon customers in the US and UK

The Amazon Treasure Truck
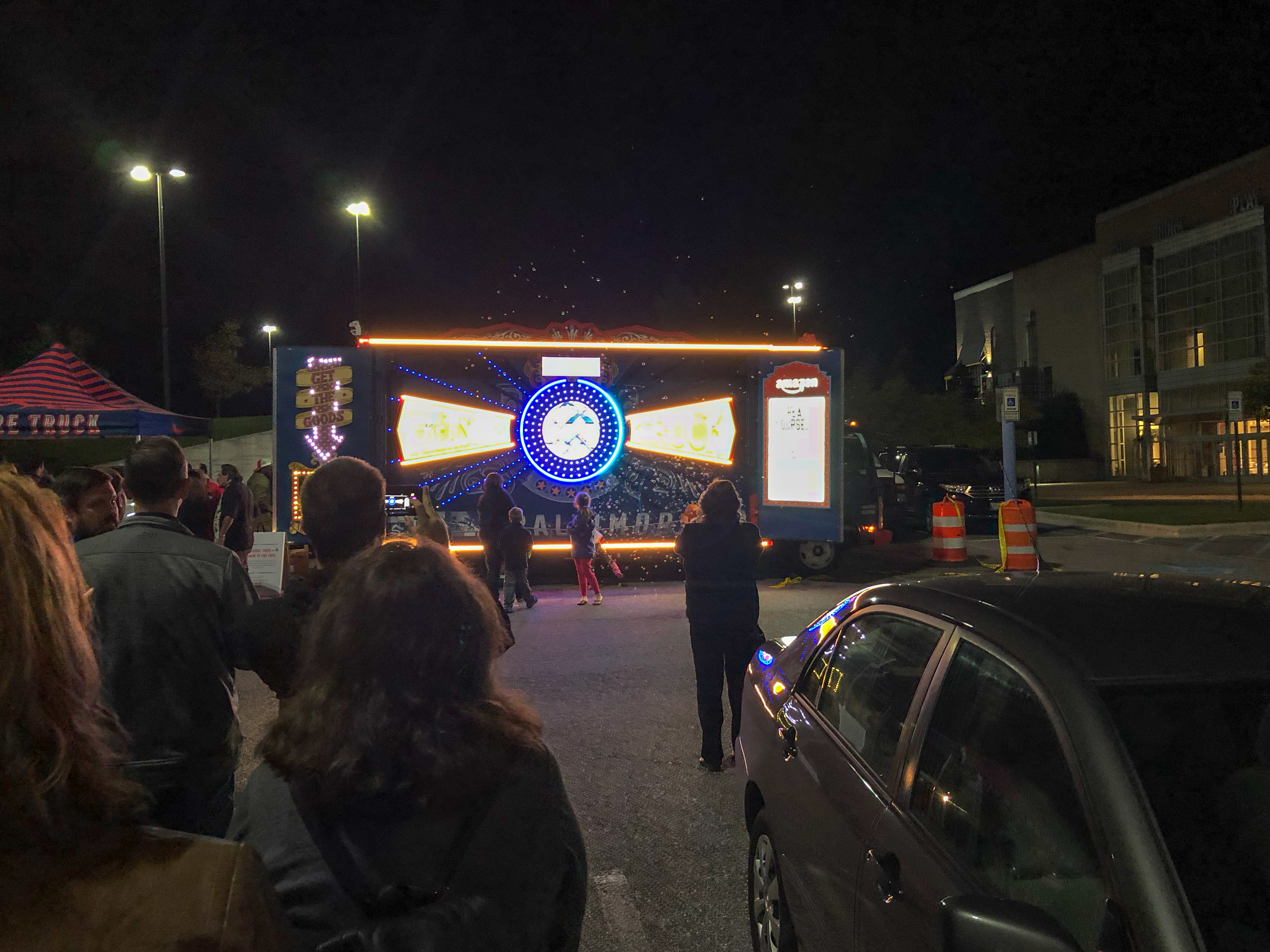
- An Amazon Treasure Truck in Baltimore
- Founded: June 25, 2015; 10 years ago
- Defunct: November 2, 2022
- Areas served: US and UK
- Owner: Amazon
- Website: Treasure Truck (US); Treasure Truck (UK)

Treasure Truck was a free subscription-based service offered to Amazon customers in the US and UK. It notified subscribers of hand selected offers and experiences via SMS.

== History ==
The first Treasure Truck was released in Amazon's hometown of Seattle in June 2015. Initially, Treasure Truck offered one item at a time, which customers ordered using the Amazon app and picked up at a designated location the same day. As part of a holiday promotion, Seattle Seahawks player Marshawn Lynch drove the Treasure Truck around Seattle in December 2016 selling a limited-edition beast-mode Echo. In December 2017, two cities in the United Kingdom became the first international locations for the Treasure Truck program. Each Treasure Truck was active up to 5 days per week.

== Offers ==
Treasure Truck's one-day offers included popular, trending, or interesting products from a wide variety of product categories. Previous offers included housewares, tech gadgets, smart home devices, outdoor gear, beauty items, games, and toys.

== Shift to delivery ==
After pausing offers during the COVID-19 pandemic, Treasure Truck resumed offers in both the US and UK in August and September 2020, respectively, with a new fulfilment model. Customers still order through the Amazon app or website, but items were shipped to their homes directly, instead of requiring pickup.

== Expansion ==
In April 2021, Treasure Truck expanded its availability to serve more customers across the US and UK.

== End of the Treasure Truck ==
The service ended in the UK on January 12, 2022. The service ended in the US on November 2, 2022, after Amazon published a notification on the Treasure Truck website stating "As of November 2, 2022 we will no longer offer Treasure Truck promotions.".
