= BEEBUG =

UK computing magazine

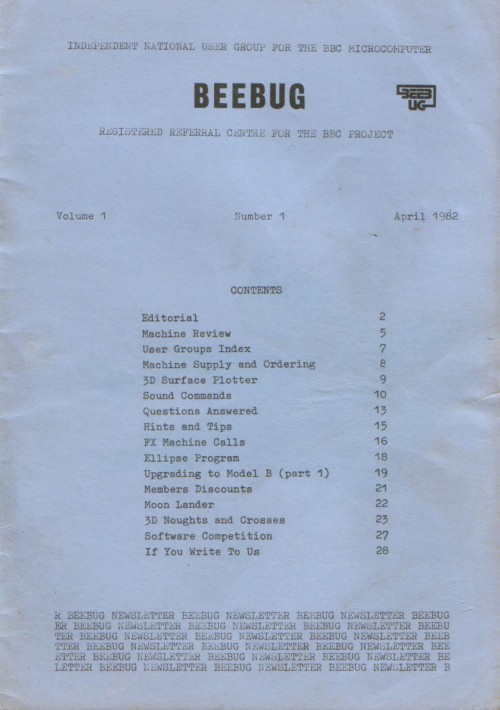
- First issue cover
- Categories: Computing
- Founder: Sheridan Williams; Lee Calcraft
- Founded: 1981
- First issue: April 1982
- Final issue: April 1994
- Company: Beebug
- Country: United Kingdom
- Based in: St. Albans, Herts
- Language: English
- ISSN: 0263-7561
- OCLC: 220052713

BEEBUG was a magazine published for users of the BBC Micro between 1982 and 1994. It was the first subscription magazine for computers made by Acorn Computers.

== History ==
=== BBC Micro User Group ===
The group was formed in 1982 by Sheridan Williams and Lee Calcraft. Calcraft and Williams were contributors to Personal Computer World magazine (PCW) at the time. Calcraft was writing under pseudonyms in PCW, Acorn User and The Micro User. Williams was a founding contributor to PCW.

When Acorn announced that they had won the contract to provide the computer to support the BBC's Computer Literacy Project, BEEBUG was formed to provide a magazine and support group. It turned out that Acorn were unable to supply the BBC Micro for many months and customers who had ordered the computer were anxious to learn as much about it before its arrival.

Within 6 months membership reached 10,000 and by 1985 membership exceeded 30,000; in the final issue, the editors estimated 60,000 people had subscribed at one time or another during the magazine's lifetime. The company is still in existence and nowadays the core business involves providing computer networks in schools.

=== Magazine ===
The first issue of the Beebug Newsletter appeared in April 1982 and the last issue, volume 12 no 10, in April 1994. Newsagents W H Smith sold the magazine at some point. It was the first subscription magazine for computers made by Acorn Computers.

At the start the cover was monochrome, but a colour printed cover was then introduced in March 1983 when membership was 16,000. At the beginning each issue had 28 pages, but it expanded to 50 pages by 1985 when membership exceeded 30,000. The content included hints, program listings, hardware and software reviews, brain teasers and competitions. Illustrations were rudimentary. The magazine sometimes included special members' offers for items such as operating system upgrades. Cover mounted tape cassettes containing programs, binders and an advertising supplement were also published.

It was published 10 times a year in A5 format. It was published by BEEBUG Publications Ltd, based in St Albans, UK. In 1985 membership including a postal subscription in the UK cost £11-90 a year (10 issues).

== Reception ==
The magazine and its younger Acorn Archimedes companion RISC User were considered by Archive in 1990 as "friendly rival[s]". The magazine was remembered in 1998 as being "an essential source of information and tips for BBC Micro and Master users".

Professor Krisantha Weerasuriya of Sri Lanka's University of Colombo noted the user group and its magazine to be "very helpful" in a 1988 issue of the BMJ.

== Legacy ==
A review from a 1984 issue of the magazine was cited in United States patent no. 5,271,098 in 1993.

Some of the topics covered in the magazine listings included fractal trees, Lorenz attractors and modelling of 3D functions. Such basic principles have been included in the 2004 book Flash Math Creativity, with reference to the magazine's coverage of the topics. An enhanced version of one listing was included in the 1996 book An Introduction to Experimental Physics.

== See also ==
- Acorn User
- The Micro User / Acorn Computing
- Archive (magazine)
- Electron User
