= E-Type (video game) =

1989 video game

- Publisher: The Fourth Dimension
- Designer: Gordon J. Key
- Platforms: BBC Micro, Acorn Electron, Acorn Archimedes
- Release: 1989
- Genre: Racing
- Mode: Single-player

E-Type is a clone of Sega's arcade driving game Out Run for the BBC Micro, Acorn Electron, and Acorn Archimedes. It was written by Gordon J. Key and published by The Fourth Dimension. Instead of the Ferrari from Out Run, the player drives a blue Jaguar E-type.

In addition to the game a separate track designer was released which allows players to make and save their own tracks. A pack of extra tracks entitled The Extra 100 Miles was available.

== Gameplay ==
The objective of E-Type is to cover as much distance as possible in the given time limit over various stages, avoiding static obstacles such as roadworks, oil slicks, trees and postboxes. If the car hits such an object both the driver and his blonde female passenger are thrown upwards from their seats, with the car's wheels falling off on their landing. The car is then automatically reset and moved to the centre of the road for the player to restart. Additionally, other cars can also be seen driving along the roads and need to be avoided - collisions here also add damage the car.

When the car has had too many hits, the passengers fall into their seats and the car's bumper falls off, meaning that the game is over. On parts of some tracks, the road is surrounded by water - if the car drives onto the water, it will submerge and the game is over.

The player can earn extra time for a stage by driving under a Time Bonus banner (to the sound of a bell) or by running a policeman over. The stages can be played at individually or as a set, with the player needing to complete a stage in order to progress. Players who get the best distances are able to enter their names into the Hall of Fame hi-score table.

=== Controls ===
On the Archimedes version, the player takes control of the car using the mouse. The three Acorn mouse buttons represent (from left) the Clutch, Brake and Accelerator. This adds to the "realism" of the game as this corresponds to the typical layout of the car's foot pedals. Definable keyboard keys were used for gear changes (in Manual gearbox mode).

The version for the BBC is controlled by the keyboard, with the player given the option to redefine the keys once the title screen is shown. The Automatic gearbox mode is omitted so the player must change gears manually with the defined keys.

== Reception ==
In 1989, Lazarus of The Micro User rated the game a 9/10 overall, noting "there's just one word to describe E-Type: Fantastic". The reviewer highlighted that "a trip computer display gives elapsed time, distance covered, average speed, skill level and adjusted score", and "you and your car can take a certain number of bumps and knocks before becoming completely defunct". Geoff Brown, in the "View II" review for The Micro User, commented that "the feeling of speed is superb" and "really enjoyed running down" cones with no "apparent penalty". Brown also highlighted that E-Type "is obviously seen as the Archimedes answer to arcade games like Out-run" and "as a simple car racing game it's certainly fun but it isn't a simulation – and as a competitor to Out-run? There's no music". In 1990, Stephen Wade of The Micro User rated the BBC Micro version of the game a 8/10 overall. He commented that "anyone expecting a pure copy of the Archimedes version can forget it", however, "gameplay is very similar" with identical tracks and "only a few features are missing". Wade highlighted that "the graphics are for obvious reasons of an inferior calibre, but by 8 bit micro standards are still very impressive".

== Legacy ==
The E-Type Compendium later combined the original game with the track designer and The Extra 100 Miles track collection.

E-Type 2 was released in 1994 and contained a few additions to the original, including a 2-player split-screen mode. The 2nd player appears as the blonde female passenger from the first game, behind the wheel of a pink E-Type Jaguar. Other features include tunnels, three-lane roads, bad weather conditions, police radar traps, overheating cars and various weapons for attacking other cars. Separate versions of E-Type 2 were released for the Archimedes and the Risc PC.
