= Gordon J. Key =

- Occupations: Programmer, game designer, antiques
- Known for: E-Type, Apocalypse

Gordon J. Key authored video game software for the Acorn BBC Micro, Electron and RISC OS platforms in the 1980s and 1990s. His most well-known works were published by The Fourth Dimension (earlier known as Impact Software). He is also credited with additional programming routines in FedNet's futuristic flight combat game Star Fighter 3000 (1994), and authored Party Machine for the Amstrad CPC.

In an article about the Electron referring to Key's Holed Out! golf simulator, Steve Botterill (co-founder of The Fourth Dimension) referred to Key as being "one of the most brilliant programmers" he had ever met. In an interview in the November 1988 issue of The Micro User, Key explained that his development as a programmer began for pleasure, modifying existing games. He then used increasingly more machine code in an effort to produce magazine games of equal quality to commercial titles. At the time of publishing Clogger, he was learning ARM assembly language in addition to setting up a vehicle restoration business for old buses.

In 2010, Key answered a number of questions posed by registered members of The Icon Bar forum. He has not written any commercial software since starting in the antiques trade.

== List of games ==
- Clogger (BBC Micro/Acorn Electron)
- E-Type (BBC Micro/Acorn Electron/Acorn Archimedes, 1989)
- Holed Out! (BBC Micro/Acorn Electron/Acorn Archimedes, 1989)
- Apocalypse (Acorn Archimedes, 1990)
- Break 147 / Superpool (Acorn Archimedes, 1991)
- Black Angel (Acorn Archimedes, 1992)
- Haunted House (Acorn Archimedes)
- The Time Machine (Acorn Archimedes)
- E-Type 2 (Acorn Archimedes/RiscPC)
- Virtual Golf (Acorn Archimedes/RiscPC)
- Powerband (Acorn Archimedes/RiscPC)
- Pendragon (BBC Micro)
