= Electron User =

British magazine

- First issue cover
- Categories: Computing
- Frequency: Monthly
- Publisher: Database Publications
- First issue: October 1983
- Final issue: July 1990
- Country: United Kingdom
- Based in: Stockport
- Language: English
- ISSN: 0952-3057
- OCLC: 499397017

Electron User was a magazine targeted at owners of the Acorn Electron microcomputer. It was published by Database Publications of Stockport, starting in October 1983 and ending after 82 issues in July 1990.

Initially it was included as a 16-page pullout supplement to The Micro User but after four such editions it became a standalone title and within a year had grown to an average length of around 64 pages. The focus was news stories, type-in programs and software reviews. It also contained cheat codes and a long-running column on adventure games initially by "Merlin" in a column entitled "Merlin's Cave" and subsequently by "Pendragon".

Its advertisers included the top BBC/Electron games distributors of the day, such as Acornsoft and Superior Software.

Often the April-dated edition of the magazine included an April Fools' Day joke, generally consisting of a short machine code type-in listing which claimed to do something extremely useful and of wide interest but which in fact printed April Fool on the screen. Examples included:

- a program to predict what text the user would type next
- a program to compile BASIC programs directly into machine code leveraging the machine's BASIC interpreter
- a program to display colours on a monochrome screen by rapidly modulating the pixels (citing a recent Tomorrow's World)

== See also ==
- Acorn User
- The Micro User / Acorn Computing
- Archive
- BEEBUG
