= April 1954 =

Month of 1954

<<	April 1954					>>
Su	Mo	Tu	We	Th	Fr	Sa
				1	2	3
4	5	6	7	8	9	10
11	12	13	14	15	16	17
18	19	20	21	22	23	24
25	26	27	28	29	30

The following events occurred in April 1954:

== April 1, 1954 (Thursday) ==
- The U.S. Congress and President Dwight D. Eisenhower authorized the founding of the United States Air Force Academy in Colorado.
- South Point School was founded in Kolkata, India. It would become the largest school in the world by 1988.
- The new Cardiff Airport at Rhoose in South Wales opened to passenger transport after operations were transferred from RAF Pengam Moors.

== April 2, 1954 (Friday) ==
- Walt Disney signed a contract with ABC television for the Disneyland series, and plans were announced for the building of the Disneyland theme park (provisionally called "Disneylandia") in California, along with a prospectus for the company's potential investors.
- Died: Hoyt Vandenberg, 55, United States Air Force general

== April 3, 1954 (Saturday) ==
- Petrov Affair: Diplomat Vladimir Petrov defected from the Soviet Union and asked for political asylum in Australia, beginning a major political incident.
- A Douglas C-47A-80-DL Skytrain, operated by Devlet Hava Yolları, crashed 15 minutes after taking off from Adana Airport in Turkey, bound for Istanbul. All 25 people on board were killed.
- On the River Thames in London, UK, the 100th annual Boat Race between the universities of Oxford and Cambridge was won by Oxford.

== April 4, 1954 (Sunday) ==
- Suffering from failing memory, legendary symphony conductor Arturo Toscanini was obliged to abandon plans for the German Requiem and introduce an alternative programme at his last concert.
- Died:
  - Pierre S. du Pont, 84, American entrepreneur, businessman and philanthropist
  - Leigh Mitchell Hodges, 77, American journalist, writer and lecturer

== April 5, 1954 (Monday) ==
- Died:
  - Princess Märtha of Sweden, 53, Crown Princess of Norway
  - Mary Riter Hamilton, 86, Canadian war artist

== April 6, 1954 (Tuesday) ==
- United States Senator Joseph McCarthy appeared on See It Now to confront journalist Edward R. Murrow: he described Murrow as "a symbol, a leader, and the cleverest of the jackal pack which is always found at the throat of anyone who dares to expose individual Communists and traitors".

== April 7, 1954 (Wednesday) ==
- U.S. President Dwight D. Eisenhower gave his "domino theory" speech during a news conference.
- Born: Jackie Chan, actor and film director; in Beijing, China
- WALB TV channel 10 in Albany, GA (NBC/ABC) begins broadcasting.

== April 8, 1954 (Thursday) ==
- Trans-Canada Air Lines Flight 9: A Royal Canadian Air Force Canadair Harvard and a Trans-Canada Airlines Canadair North Star collided over Moose Jaw, Saskatchewan, Canada. The total number of deaths was 37, including 36 people aboard the two aircraft and one person on the ground.
- South African Airways Flight 201: A de Havilland Comet 1, operated by South African Airways, disintegrated in mid-air as a result of fatigue failure while flying over the Mediterranean Sea from Rome to Cairo. All 14 passengers and seven crew were killed.
- Born: Gary Carter, American baseball player and Baseball Hall of Fame member; in Culver City, California (d. 2012)
- Died: Fritzi Scheff, 74, US actress and singer

== April 9, 1954 (Friday) ==
- Joseph Laniel, Prime Minister of France, warned the People's Republic of China to stop sending aid to the Viet Minh revolutionaries fighting in the First Indochina War.
- Died:
  - Philip Greeley Clapp, 65, American composer and educator

== April 10, 1954 (Saturday) ==
- KRGV-TV began operation.
- Born:
  - Anne Lamott, American novelist and nonfiction writer; in San Francisco, California
  - Peter MacNicol, American actor; in Dallas, Texas
  - Juan Williams, Panamanian-born American journalist and political analyst; in Colón, Panama
- Died:
  - Auguste Lumière, 91, French film pioneer

== April 11, 1954 (Sunday) ==
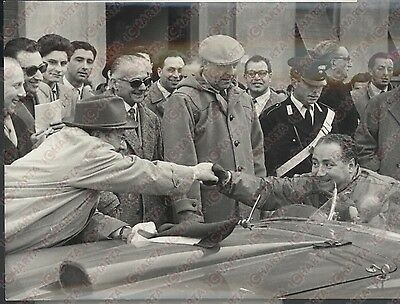
April 11, 1954: Piero Scotti after victory at the 1954 Coppa della Toscana.

- Italian driver Piero Scotti won the 1954 Coppa della Toscana sports car race in a Ferrari 375 MM.
- In a general election in Belgium, the Christian Social Party won 95 of the 212 seats in the Chamber of Representatives, and 49 of the 106 seats in the Senate. The government, led by Jean Van Houtte, lost its majority in parliament. The two other main parties, the Socialist and Liberal Party, subsequently formed a rare "purple" government, with Achille Van Acker as Prime Minister.
- Raymond Impanis won the 52nd edition of the Paris–Roubaix cycling race.
- The 1954 All-Ireland Senior Hurling Championship opened with the first round of the Leinster Senior Hurling Championship.
- The 1954 New Orleans Women's Open golf tournament, part of the LPGA Tour, concluded. Marlene Bauer won the tournament, with Betty Jameson coming in second.
- April 11, 1954, according to computer scientist and entrepreneur William Tunstall-Pedoe, is the least eventful day in the 20th century. He used his answer engine True Knowledge to identify the day with fewest significant newsworthy events, births, and deaths.
- Born:
  - Ian F. Akyildiz (born Ilhan Fuat Akyildiz), Turkish American electrical engineer; in Istanbul, Turkey
  - Abdullah Atalar, Turkish scientist and academic
  - Aleksandr Averin, Soviet Olympic cyclist; in Baku, Azerbaijan Soviet Socialist Republic, Soviet Union
  - Benedykt Kocot, Polish Olympic cyclist; in Chrząstowice, Opole Voivodeship, Poland
  - Francis Lickerish (born John Francis Lickerish), British composer, guitarist and lutenist; in Cambridge, England
  - David Perrett, Scottish evolutionary psychologist
  - Teo Peter, Romanian rock musician (Compact); in Cluj-Napoca, Romania (d. 2004, traffic collision)
  - Ian Redmond, English field biologist and conservationist; in Malaysia
  - Éric Renaut, French professional footballer; in Saint-Germain-en-Laye, France
  - Willie Royster, American professional baseball catcher; in Clarksville, Virginia (d. 2015)
  - Attila Sudár, Hungarian Olympic champion water polo player; in Budapest, Hungary
- Died: Paul Specht, 59, American dance bandleader

== April 12, 1954 (Monday) ==
- Bill Haley and His Comets recorded the ground-breaking single "Rock Around the Clock" at the Pythian Temple studios in New York City.
- Died:
  - Luis Cabrera Lobato, 77, Mexican lawyer, politician and writer
  - Prince Nikola of Yugoslavia, 25, was killed in a road accident.

== April 13, 1954 (Tuesday) ==
- While taking off from Xiengkhouang, Laos, a Lockheed C-60A-5-LO Lodestar operated by Société Indochinoise de Ravitaillement crashed, killing 16 of the 23 people on board.
- A Douglas C-47-DL Skytrain belonging to the Chilean Air Force, carrying a cargo of meat from Santiago to Los Cóndores Air Base, crashed near Batuco, killing all 14 people on board.
- Died: Angus L. Macdonald, 63, Canadian politician, Premier of Nova Scotia (heart attack)

== April 14, 1954 (Wednesday) ==
- Aneurin Bevan resigned from the British Labour Party's Shadow Cabinet in protest over his party's failure to oppose the rearmament of West Germany.
- Harold Connolly became interim Premier of Nova Scotia, Canada, after the sudden death of Angus L. Macdonald.

== April 15, 1954 (Thursday) ==
- While towing a barge from Skagway, Alaska, to Vancouver, British Columbia, Canada, the 541-ton Canadian tug Chelan sank off the entrance to Sumner Strait west of Cape Decision in Southeast Alaska. All 14 people on the ship were lost.
- KARK TV channel 4 in Little Rock, AR (NBC) begins broadcasting

== April 16, 1954 (Friday) ==
- U.S. Vice President Richard Nixon told the press that the United States might be "putting our own boys in Indochina regardless of Allied support".
- Steam trains operated for the last time on the Clinchfield Railroad, between Kingsport and Erwin, Tennessee, United States.
- Born: Ellen Barkin, American actress; in New York City

== April 17, 1954 (Saturday) ==
- Born: Roddy Piper, Canadian wrestler; in Saskatoon (d. 2015)
- Died: Lucrețiu Pătrășcanu, 53, and Remus Koffler, 52, Romanian communist activists, were executed after a show trial.

== April 18, 1954 (Sunday) ==
- A British minesweeper, operated by the Royal Naval Volunteer Reserve, caught fire and sank in the English Channel off Ostend, Belgium. All 31 crew members were rescued by the Dutch steamship Phoenix and the French ship Tunisie.

== April 19, 1954 (Monday) ==
- Two KGB couriers from the USSR arrived at Sydney Airport to escort Evdokia Petrova, a Soviet intelligence officer and the wife of Vladimir Petrov, who had recently defected to the Australian Security Intelligence Organisation, back to the USSR. The couriers were met by anti-Communist demonstrators, and the incident made world headlines. The photograph of Petrova being manhandled by the two couriers became an iconic Australian image of the 1950s, and she was removed from the plane at Darwin.

== April 20, 1954 (Tuesday) ==
- A United States Air Force Kaiser-Frazier C-119F Flying Boxcar, after a flight from Williams Air Force Base in Mesa, Arizona, crashed into a fog-shrouded ridge on Mission Point while approaching Burbank Airport in California. All seven people on board were killed.
- A new station was opened at Tacoma, Washington, United States, on the Chicago, Milwaukee, St. Paul and Pacific Railroad.
- Died: Michael Manning, 25, Irish murderer, the last person to be executed in the Irish Republic

== April 21, 1954 (Wednesday) ==
- Died: Emil Leon Post, 57, Polish American mathematician and logician

== April 22, 1954 (Thursday) ==
- France's Foreign Minister Georges Bidault told US Secretary of State John Foster Dulles that only U.S. air strikes could save Điện Biên Phủ; France dropped its objections to a multinational effort. British PM Winston Churchill refused to give any undertakings about United Kingdom military action in Indochina.
- Senator Joseph McCarthy began hearings investigating the United States Army for being "soft" on Communism. The hearings were broadcast live on U.S. television.
- The 1951 United Nations Convention Relating to the Status of Refugees came into force, defining the status of refugees and setting out the basis for granting right of asylum.

== April 23, 1954 (Friday) ==
- An Aerolineas Argentinas Douglas C-47A-5-DK Skytrain, diverted to La Rioja, Argentina, from El Plumerillo Airport in Mendoza because of severe turbulence in the Córdoba area, crashed in mountainous terrain near Sierra del Vilgo, killing all 25 people on board.
- Born: Michael Moore, American documentary filmmaker; in Flint, Michigan
- Died: Shmerke Kaczerginski, 45, Yiddish-speaking author, musician and cultural activist, was killed in the Aerolineas Argentinas crash.

== April 24, 1954 (Saturday) ==
- Wolverhampton Wanderers football club won the English Football League First Division title for the first time in its history.

== April 25, 1954 (Sunday) ==
- Bell Labs announced the invention of the first practical silicon solar cell. These cells had about 6% efficiency.

== April 26, 1954 (Monday) ==
- The 1954 Geneva Conference, an international conference on Korea and Indo-China, opened in Switzerland.
- Akira Kurosawa's film, The Seven Samurai, was released in Japan.

== April 27, 1954 (Tuesday) ==
- Celtic F.C. defeated Aberdeen F.C. 2–1 in the final of the Scottish Cup football competition.
- Born: Frank Bainimarama, prime minister of Fiji from 2007 to 2022
- Died: Antoni Bolesław Dobrowolski, 81, Polish scientist and explorer

== April 28, 1954 (Wednesday) ==
- U.S. Secretary of State John Foster Dulles accused Communist China of sending combat troops to Indo-China to train Viet Minh guerrillas.
- Died: Léon Jouhaux, 74, French labor leader and Nobel Peace Prize laureate

== April 29, 1954 (Thursday) ==
- Born:
  - Jerry Seinfeld, American comedian and actor; in Brooklyn, New York
  - Jake Burton Carpenter, American co-inventor of the snowboard; in Manhattan, New York (died 2019)
- Died: Joe May, 73, Austrian-born film director and producer

== April 30, 1954 (Friday) ==
- Bengali leader A. K. Fazlul Huq began a visit to Kolkata, against the wishes of Mohammad Ali Bogra, Prime Minister of Pakistan.
- The last passenger services ran on the Clinchfield Railroad between Elkhorn and Spartanburg, South Carolina, United States.
- Born: Jane Campion, New Zealand screenwriter, producer, and director; in Wellington
