= Archive (magazine) =

Archive Magazine

- Vol.26 – No.2, March/April 2023
- Editor: Gavin Smith
- Former editors: Jim Nagel
- Categories: Computing
- Founder: Paul Beverley
- Founded: 1987
- First issue: October 1987
- Company: Northern Oak Publishing
- Country: United Kingdom
- Language: English
- Website: archivemag.co.uk
- OCLC: 222434223

Archive is a membership magazine for users of the Acorn Archimedes personal computer and related RISC OS hardware. It is the oldest and longest-running RISC OS magazine.

== History ==
The first issue was announced in September 1987 and came out in October 1987, a month before the launch of RISC User. In August 2007, Jim Nagel took over from the founding editor Paul Beverley. After the death of Jim Nagel on 21 March 2020, the editorship passed to Gavin Smith. Members of The ARM Club were offered discounted subscriptions in 1999, around the time of the discontinuation of Archimedes World and announced closure of RISC User.

== See also ==
- (BBC) Acorn User
- The Micro User
- BEEBUG / Disc User
- Acorn Computing
- Electron User
