= The Fourth Dimension (company) =

Video game publisher

The Fourth Dimension (4D) was a major video game publisher for the BBC Micro, Acorn Electron, Acorn Archimedes and RiscPC between 1989 and 1998. Previously, the Fourth Dimension had been known as Impact Software, which specialised mainly in BBC Micro games. Some of 4D's staff had worked for Superior Software. Notable release included Cyber Chess, Stunt Racer 2000, Galactic Dan and Chocks Away.

== History ==
In 1989, the Fourth Dimension was founded by brothers Mark and Steve Botterill in Sheffield. Originally it was called Impact Software. It released software for Acorn's 8-bit and 32-bit computer ranges.

Following the demise of Acorn and the subsequent contraction of the RISC OS games market, The Fourth Dimension brand and rights to the software back-catalogue was acquired by CJE Micro's.

In 2002, the publisher backed a scheme subsidising the cost of hardware for developers.

In 2004, CJE Micro's sold the rights to the software to APDL, the Archimedes Public Domain Library.

== Market focus ==
Although the Archimedes market was relatively small, it had a fast 32-bit RISC processor with a slim accelerated pipeline that encouraged fast graphics operations. Certain of 4D's games anticipate the 3D, first-person viewpoint style of graphics that was becoming popular on the much larger PC market at the same time. For example, E-type is a car racing game; Chocks Away is an air combat game with a two-player dogfight mode; and Galactic Dan is a primitive 1992 first-person shooter with a pre-Wolfenstein 3D graphics style, combining a 3D Maze look with ray-traced sprites.

== List of published games ==
- Apocalypse (Gordon J. Key, 1990)
- Arcade Soccer (Peter Gillett, 1989)
- Birds of War
- Black Angel (Gordon J. Key, 1992)
- Boogie Buggy (Coin-Age, 1991)
- Break 147 & Superpool (Gordon J. Key, 1991)
- Carnage Inc. (Coding: Chris & Stuart Fludger; Graphics: Andrew Jackson; Screen & puzzle design: Chris Fludger; Vector Graphics: Stuart Fludger 1993)
- Cataclysm (David Postlethwaite)
- Chocks Away (Andrew Hutchings, 1990)
- Chocks Away Extra Missions (Andrew Hutchings, 1991)
- Chopper Force (Andrew Norris, 1992)
- Cyber Chess (William Tunstall-Pedoe, 1993)
- Custom McCoy (4 games chosen by buyer from list of applicable games)
- Demon's Lair (Dr. Kevin Martin)
- Drop Ship (Andrew Catling, 1990)
- The Dungeon (Martin Dennett & John Parker, 1993)
- Enter The Realm (Audio, Visual & Code: Graeme Richardson, Music: Peter Gillett, 1991)
- E-Type (Gordon J. Key, 1989)
- E-Type Track Designer (Gordon J. Key, 1989)
- E-Type Compendium (Gordon J. Key)
- E-Type 2 (Gordon J. Key)
- The Exotic Adventures of Sylvia Layne
- Galactic Dan (Coding: Ian Holmes; Graphics: James Davidson, 1992)
- Grievous Bodily 'ARM (Software Engineering: Simon Hallam; Graphics: Sophie Neal; Music: The Byford Brothers, 1991)
- Haunted House (Gordon J. Key)
- Holed Out! (Gordon J. Key, 1989)
- Holed Out Designer (Gordon J. Key, 1990)
- Holed Out Extra Courses Vol. 1 & 2 (Gordon J. Key)
- Holed Out Compendium (Gordon J. Key, 1991)
- Inertia (David Postlethwaite, 1990)
- Logic Mania - Gloop, Blindfold, Atomix, Tilt (Robin Jubber, Dave Williams, 1996)
- Man At Arms (Coding: Matthew Atkinson; Music: Peter Gillett, 1990)
- Nevryon (Coding & Graphics: Graeme Richardson; Music: Peter Gillett, 1990)
- The Olympics (1990)
- Pandora's Box (Coding: Chris & Stuart Fludger; Graphics: Andrew Jackson; Additional Graphics: Chris Fludger; Title Music: Simon Carless, 1992)
- Powerband (Gordon J. Key, 1990)
- Pysanki (Coding: Matthew Atkinson; Music: David Postlethwaite, 1990)
- Quazer (1990) (Published as Impact Software)
- Real McCoy Compendium series:

- Real McCoy 1 - Arcade Soccer, Quazer, U.I.M and White Magic (1990)
- Real McCoy 2 - Apocalypse, Holed Out!, Inertia and The Olympics (1991)
- Real McCoy 3 - Drop Ship, Nevryon, Powerband and The Wimp Game.
- Real McCoy 4 - Cataclysm, Galactic Dan, Grievous Bodily 'ARM and X-Fire.
- Real McCoy 5 - Anti-Grav, Chopper Force, Demon's Lair and Pandora's Box.
- Real McCoy 6 - Bloodlust, Carnage Inc., Silverball and Technodream.

- Saloon Cars (Andy Swain 1991)
- Saloon Cars Deluxe (Andy Swain, 1992)
- Saloon Cars Deluxe Extra Courses Vol. 1 (Andy Swain)
- Spobbleoid Fantasy (Graeme Richardson, 1995)
- Stunt Racer 2000 (Fednet a.k.a. Andrew Hutchings and Tim Parry, 1993)
- The Time Machine (Gordon J. Key)
- U.I.M: Ultra Intelligent Machine
- Virtual Golf (Gordon J. Key)
- White Magic (John Whigham, 1989)
- White Magic 2 (John Whigham, 1989)
- The Wimp Game (Thomas E.H. Nunns, 1990)
- X-Fire (The Soft Lads a.k.a. Mark Neves, Martin Portman and Paul Carrol, 1992)
