= Chocks Away =

1990 flight simulator video game

- Developer(s): Andrew Hutchings
- Publisher(s): The Fourth Dimension
- Designer(s): Andrew Hutchings
- Platform(s): Acorn Archimedes (RISC OS)
- Release: 1990
- Genre(s): Combat flight simulator
- Mode(s): Single-player, multiplayer

Chocks Away is a flight simulation game for the Acorn Archimedes. It was written by Andrew Hutchings and published by The Fourth Dimension in 1990. The game is loosely set in the First World War, though many elements are simplified and anachronistic.

== Gameplay ==
The player flies a single British Tiger Moth aircraft (despite the design dating from peacetime and being a trainer) on various missions against German forces. Free movement is allowed around each mission's map, though the aircraft does not have the fuel capacity to allow infinite roaming - instead it must return to the home airfield to refuel. The Tiger Moth carries a single fixed forward-firing machine gun with infinite ammunition. The player pilots the plane from an in-cockpit view, though a chase camera is used if they are shot down, showing the helpless demise of their aircraft.

The missions involved a mix of target ground attack and interception, all undertaken solo and all requiring the player to land safely at home base afterwards. A number of German aircraft will attempt to intervene by attacking the player's aircraft, which can take six hits before being shot down and crashing - though it can be repaired at the home air strip if the player is capable of reaching it. Later missions take part on a much-simplified and undersize map of Western Europe, with the UK as the player's base. For some missions an aircraft carrier is used as the base instead of an airstrip.

Enemy aircraft include primitive, simple representation of German World War I types such as the Fokker Eindecker, Fokker Triplane and Gotha G.IV bomber. AI skill varies on these machines, which all have varying attributes - the Triplane is highly manoeuvrable whereas the Gotha is slow but has a flexible range of fire. Ground-based anti-aircraft turrets are used by both sides. The only time another British aircraft is seen is if a player attacks a friendly base, at which point a second Tiger Moth - with very high AI - is dispatched to attack the player; these are swiftly replaced if destroyed by the player, while the home base's anti-aircraft fire also attacks the player, making landing for repair or refuelling nearly impossible. At the end of a mission - successful or otherwise - a player will be presented with a tally of kills, including the player's own aircraft if the mission has been unsuccessful.

In addition to the missions the game includes skirmish-style scenarios, ranging from simple landing and takeoff exercises to dogfights through to attacking a large enemy aircraft formation. Unlike the missions, which always start with the player stationary on their home base, these sometimes start with the Tiger Moth mid-air.

The game uses two discs - a 'game' disc required for loading up, then a missions disc. 4th Dimension brought out a supplement called Chocks Away Extra Missions which could provide a new set of scenarios but required the first disc from the initial release to run. Hutchings then began work on Spitfire Fury, a World War 2 equivalent of the game for 4th Dimension, but this hit development trouble and was abandoned. Instead 4th Dimension's next flight simulator would be the ambitious and long-gestating Birds of War.

== Reception ==
Acorn User praised its two player mode, saying it was "...brilliantly good fun".

== Screenshots ==
A passing airfield as viewed from the player's aircraft cockpit

The famous rugby pitch whose goals you can fly under

A church
