= Amazon Echo =

Voice command device from Amazon

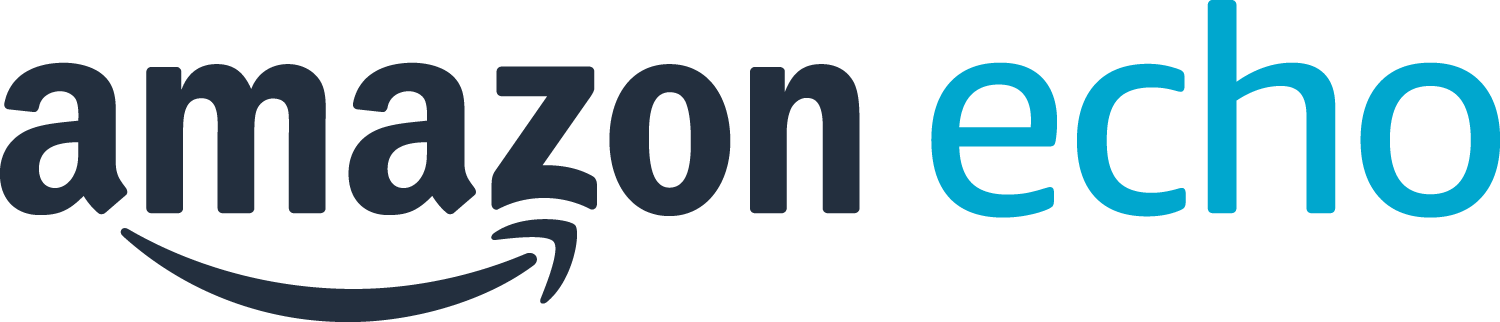
- Developer: Amazon
- Manufacturer: Amazon
- Type: Smart speaker
- Released: November 6, 2014; 12 years ago
- Operating system: Vega OS
- Input: Voice commands
- Current firmware: Vega OS
- Website: Amazon Echo (US); Amazon Echo (UK); Amazon Echo (Ger); Amazon Echo (India); Amazon Echo (France)

Amazon Echo, often shortened to Echo, is a brand of smart speakers developed by Amazon. Echo devices connect to the voice-controlled intelligent personal assistant service, Alexa, which responds to a wake term (Alexa, and others) when spoken by its user. The features of the device include voice interaction, audio program playback, such as music, streaming podcasts, and audiobooks, maintaining to-do lists, alarms, and scheduling reminders, in addition to providing weather, traffic and other real-time information. It can also control several smart devices, acting as a home automation hub.

Amazon started developing Echo devices inside its Lab126 offices in Silicon Valley and in Cambridge, Massachusetts, as early as 2010. The device represented one of its first attempts to expand its device portfolio beyond the Kindle e-reader.

Amazon initially limited the first-generation Echo to Amazon Prime members or just by invitation, but it became widely available in the United States in mid-2015, and subsequently in other countries. Additionally, the Alexa voice service is available to be added to other devices, and Amazon encourages other companies' devices and services to connect to it.

== History ==
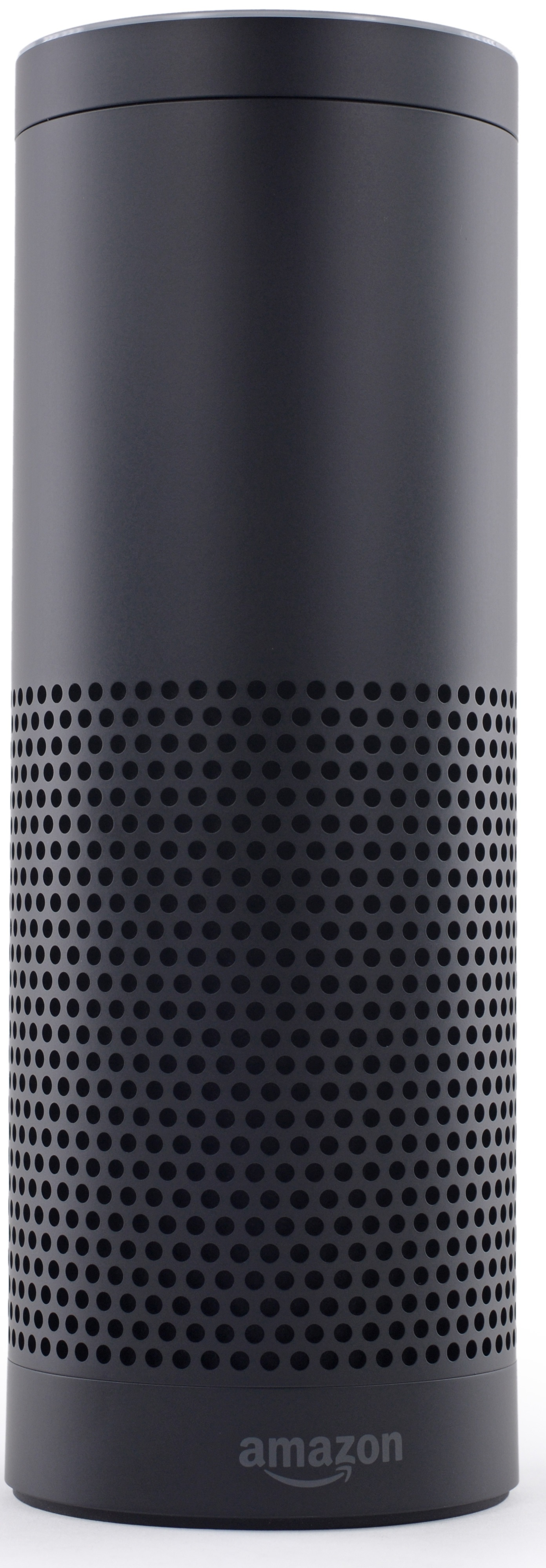
The first-generation Amazon Echo

Work on the Amazon Echo began in 2011, known as "Project D". It was named this because the Kindle was Project A and the Fire Phone was Project B. The Amazon Echo was an offshoot of Project C. Project C is unknown, even though the work on it has stopped. The Amazon Echo was originally supposed to be called the Amazon Flash. The wake word, the word that makes the device responsive, for the Echo used to be "Amazon". Both of these attributes were disliked by Lab126, the division of Amazon that conducts research and development and creates computer hardware. Lab126 believed that "Amazon" is too commonly used, and the device would react when it was not intended to. Jeff Bezos, the Amazon CEO, ended up being influenced by Lab126 to change the name of the device to the Amazon Echo and the wake word to "Alexa".

The Amazon Echo was originally pitched as only a smart speaker, it was not intended to be a smart home hub until after it was launched. As Alexa, the artificial intelligence (A.I.) that powers the Amazon Echo, improved, the device became more a controlling center for smart home appliances. Dave Isbitski, the chief developer evangelist for the Echo and Alexa, received calls from smart home manufacturers to discuss connecting their devices, after the release of the Amazon Echo. But smart home devices had a problem: people were not buying them because they often required an extra app in order to be used, which was not much better than just using the device manually.

The Amazon Echo (1st Generation) was released in 2014 alongside the voice of the product, Alexa. Alexa is a voice associated with the Amazon Echo that responds to questions and requests through artificial intelligence. Amazon has claimed that the voice of Alexa was inspired by electronic communications systems featured in the television series Star Trek: The Original Series and Star Trek: The Next Generation. The Echo was announced on Nov 6, 2014 and available by invitation only. It became available to all customers on July 14, 2015.

The Echo featured prominently in Amazon's first Super Bowl broadcast television advertisement in 2016.

In March 2016, Amazon released a less expensive version of the Amazon Echo, called the Amazon Echo Dot. This device is an ice hockey puck sized version of the original Amazon Echo released in 2014, and it has the same capabilities. This product was designed to be used in smaller rooms such as bedrooms due to its limited speaker capabilities (size) or to be paired with an external speaker. In November 2016, the second generation of the Echo Dot was released for a lower price with improved voice recognition and new colors.

The second generation of the Amazon Echo was released in October 2017. This update offered better voice recognition and a fabric covering exterior. Subsequently, other variants of the Amazon Echo have been released.

In May 2017, Amazon released the since-discontinued Amazon Tap, a portable, slightly smaller version of the Amazon Echo. Although the two products are similar the Tap is battery powered, portable, and requires the touch of a button in order to enable voice commands.

In April 2017, the Amazon Echo Look was released to invitees only, as an Amazon Echo with a built in camera. It was designed as a speaker, that has smart algorithms to help users pick out outfits. It was released to the general public in August 2018. The Look was phased out in 2020.

In June 2018, the Amazon Echo Show was released to the public as a device with a 7-inch screen used for streaming media, making video calls and using Alexa. The second generation of the device was made available in November 2018 and features a 10 inches (25 cm) screen with improved speakers.

On September 30, 2025, Amazon held its annual Devices and Services event in New York City. The company announced updates across multiple product categories, including new Echo speakers, Fire TV hardware, and Kindle devices. A notable highlight was the reported development of a Linux-based operating system, Vega OS, intended to replace FireOS on Fire TV products and potentially extend to other Amazon hardware. The event also marked the continued rollout of Alexa+, Amazon’s generative AI–powered assistant, following its limited early access launch earlier in the year.

== Features ==
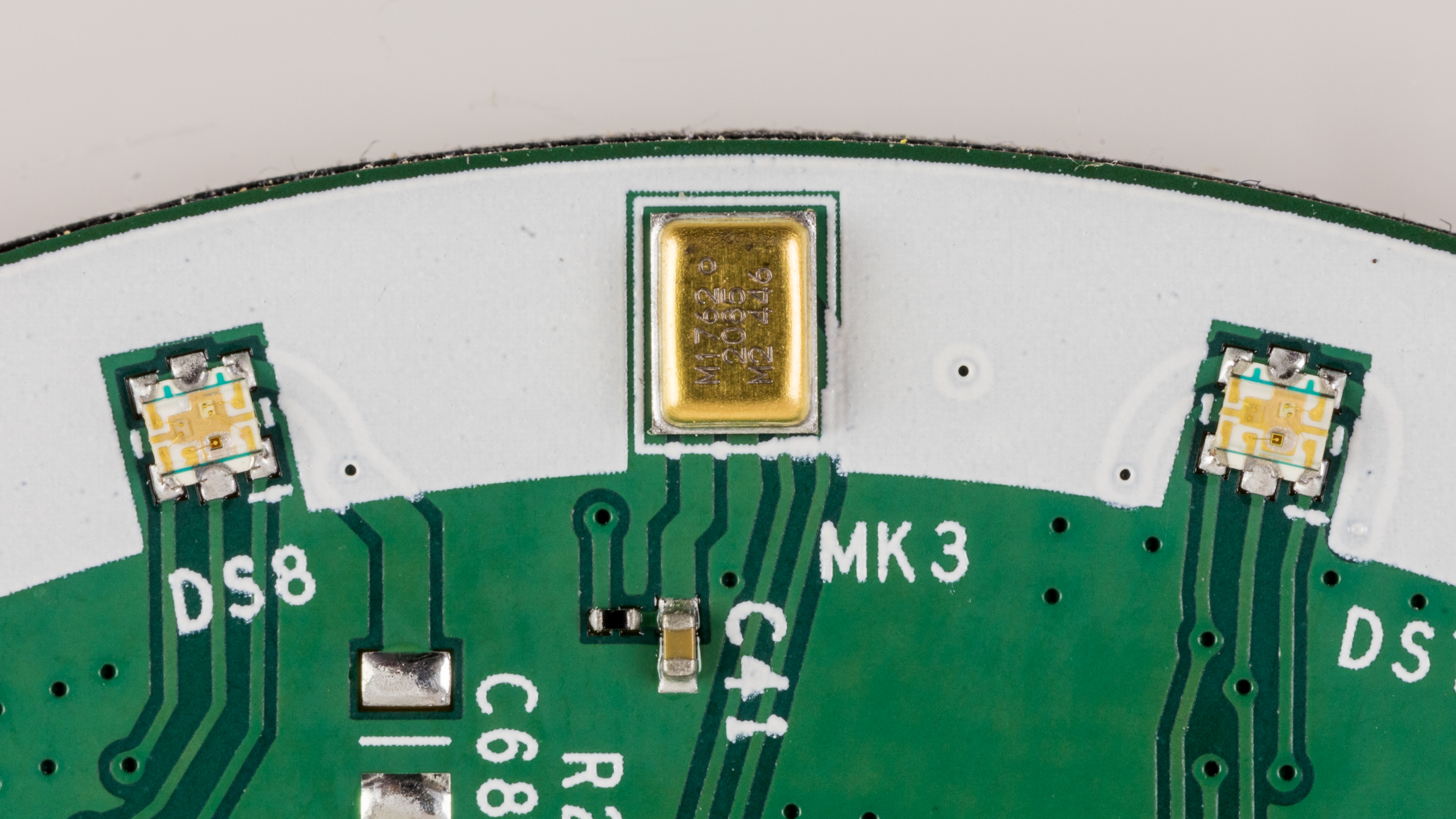
A microphone (center) and two LEDs (left and right) inside an Echo Dot

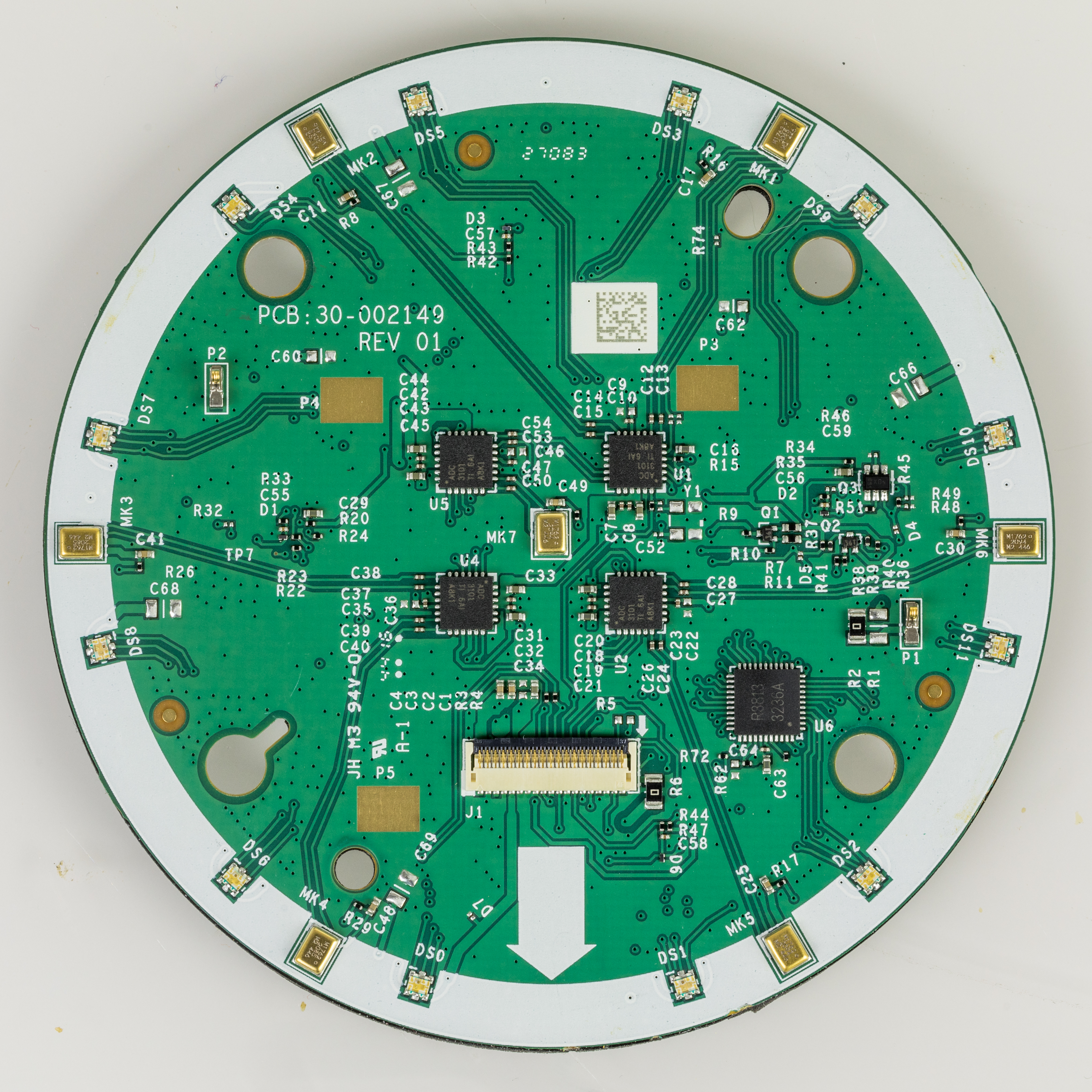
The Echo contains several microphones (here: an array of seven microphones inside an Echo Dot, with six of them arranged in a circle alternating with LEDs)

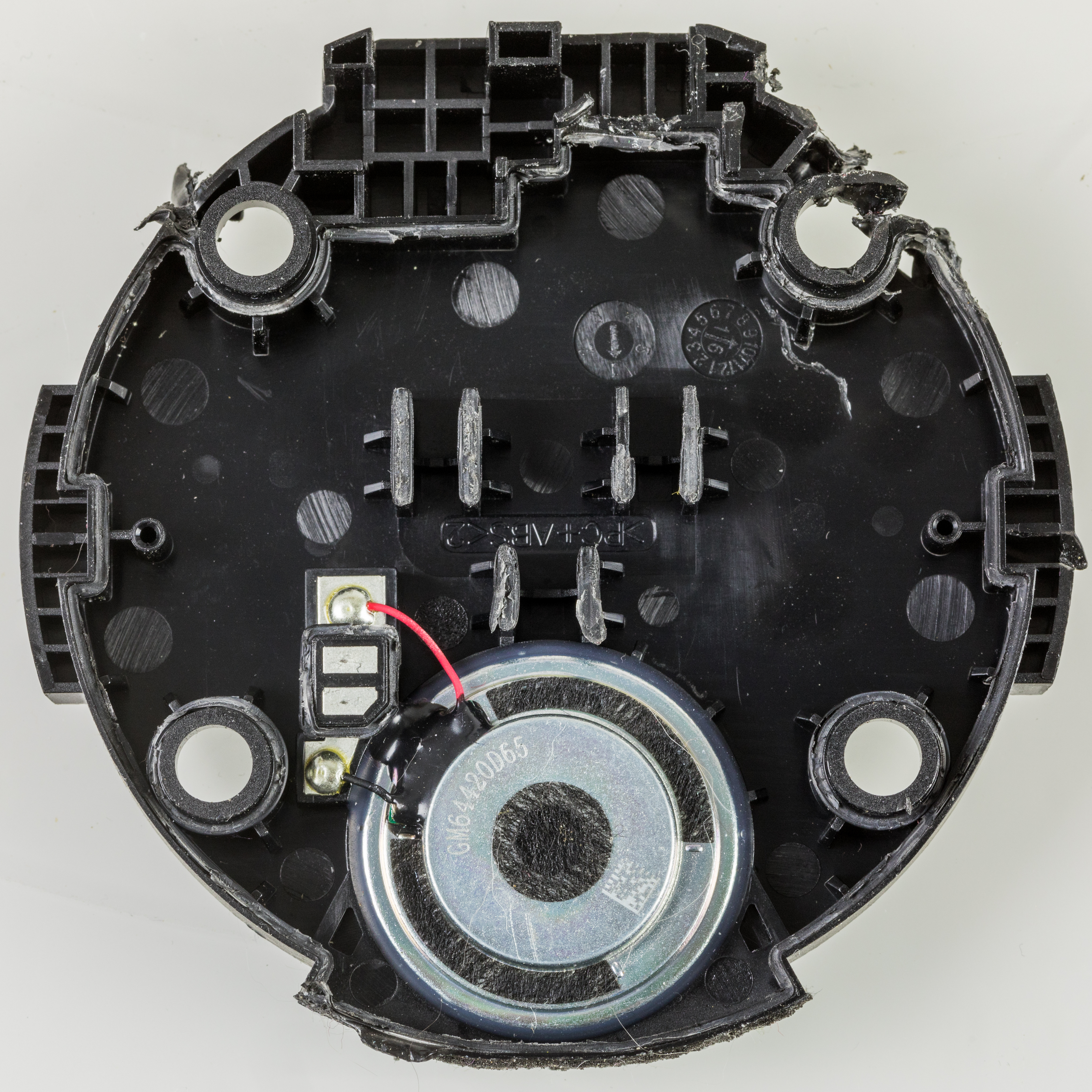
A loudspeaker inside an Echo Dot

=== Overview of operation ===
In the default mode, the device continuously listens to all speech, monitoring for the wake word to be spoken, which is primarily set up as "Alexa" (derived from Alexa Internet, the Amazon-owned Internet indexing company). Echo's microphones can be manually disabled by pressing a mute button to turn off the audio processing circuit.

Echo devices require a wireless Internet connection in order to work. Echo's voice recognition capability is based on Amazon Web Services and the voice platform Amazon acquired from Yap, Evi, and IVONA (a Polish-based specialist in voice technologies used in the Kindle Fire). The device requires one time setup by pairing it with Amazon's Alexa app, which gives the user more control over features.

The smart speakers perform well with a "good" (low-latency) Internet connection, which minimizes processing time due to minimal communication round trips, streaming responses and geo-distributed service endpoints. While the application is free, an Amazon account is required, and setup is not possible without one.

=== Available services ===
Echo devices offer weather from AccuWeather and news from a variety of sources, including local radio stations, BBC, NPR, and ESPN from TuneIn and iHeartRadio. Echo can play music from the owner's Amazon Music accounts and has built-in support for other streaming music services like Apple Music, Spotify, Deezer, Pandora and Sirius XM among others, and has support for IFTTT and Nest thermostats. Echo can also play music from non-compatible music streaming services such as Google Play Music from a phone or tablet via Bluetooth. Echo maintains voice-controlled alarms, timers, shopping and to-do lists and can access Wikipedia articles. Echo will respond to questions about items in one's Google Calendar. It also integrates with Yonomi, Philips Hue, Belkin Wemo, SmartThings, Insteon, and Wink. Additionally, integration with the Echo is in the works for Countertop by Orange Chef, Sonos, Scout Alarm, Garageio, Toymail, MARA, and Mojio. Questions like "Who is Barack Obama?" are answered by reading the first few lines of the corresponding Wikipedia article.

Echo devices also have access to "skills" built with the Alexa Skills Kit. These are third-party-developed voice applications which add functionality to any Alexa-enabled device. Examples of skills include the ability to play music, answer general questions, set an alarm, order a pizza or a ridesharing car (e.g., Uber, Lyft), and so on. The Alexa Skills Kit is a collection of self-service application programming interfaces (API), tools, documentation and code samples. Developers can also use the "Smart Home Skill API", a new addition to the Alexa Skills Kit, to extend Alexa's compatibility with cloud-controlled lighting and thermostat devices. All of the code runs in the cloud and nothing is on any user device. A developer can follow tutorials to learn how to build voice-response capability for their new and existing applications.

In November 2018, Amazon added Skype calling ability to all of their Echo products. Echo devices that have a display have access to video calling.

In May 2019, Amazon released Alexa Guard. If "Away mode" is enabled and an Echo device detects the sound of smoke alarms, carbon monoxide alarms, or glass breaking, it will send alerts to the Alexa app on smartphones. If the user has professional monitoring, it can send alerts directly to the security provider. It can also switch smart lights on and off to make it look like someone is home. A paid feature called Guard Plus enables other features such as playing the sound of a dog barking when an intruder is detected.

=== Voice services ===
The Alexa Voice Service (AVS) allows developers to voice-enable connected products with a microphone and speaker. The AVS enables volume control, audio playback, and speech recognition. The devices have natural lifelike voices resulting from speech-unit technology. High speech accuracy is achieved through sophisticated natural language processing algorithms built into the Echo's text-to-speech engine.

=== Software updates ===
As with all Alexa devices, the functionality of Echo smart speakers periodically evolves as Amazon releases new software for it. Most new releases fix bugs in addition to including enhanced functionality. New releases are pushed to the devices on a gradual basis so it may take several days to a week or more for a particular device to be updated. Because much of Echo's intelligence lies in the cloud, significant functional enhancements can be made to Echo without updating the software version it is running. For example, in April 2015, the Echo added the ability to give live sports scores without updating the software version running on the device.

=== Smart home devices ===
The Amazon Echo is able to connect to many different smart home devices. Thermostats, humidifiers, lightbulbs, plugs, dog and cat feeders, door locks, cameras, security systems, speakers, WiFi, televisions, vacuums, microwaves, printers, and other smart home devices can now all be controlled through Alexa. The user is able to organize these smart home devices by putting them into groups. For example, a user can make a "Music Group" on the Amazon Echo. The Amazon Echo will be able to play music and other media in multiple rooms in a house through other Echos and speakers that are in the "Music Group". Along with multiple groups, an Amazon Echo can hold multiple profiles. Switching between the profiles can allow users to play their music, access their calendars, and use their accounts for shopping, instead of just using one person's.

In December 2021, an outage of Amazon's cloud service caused smart home devices to stop working.

=== Hands-free ===
Amazon Echos are able to make calls and send messages. Users can make calls to another Amazon Echo or speaker that is in the house by calling the device name. Users can also make calls and send messages to other people that have an Amazon Echo. This is done by connecting the user's contacts to the Amazon Echo. The user's Amazon Echo will call their contact's Amazon Echo. They will be able to have a conversation using the Amazon Echos. Messages will go to the contact's phone, in the Alexa App. The message can also be played on the Echo.

== Variants ==
=== Echo ===
Amazon Echo (first generation)
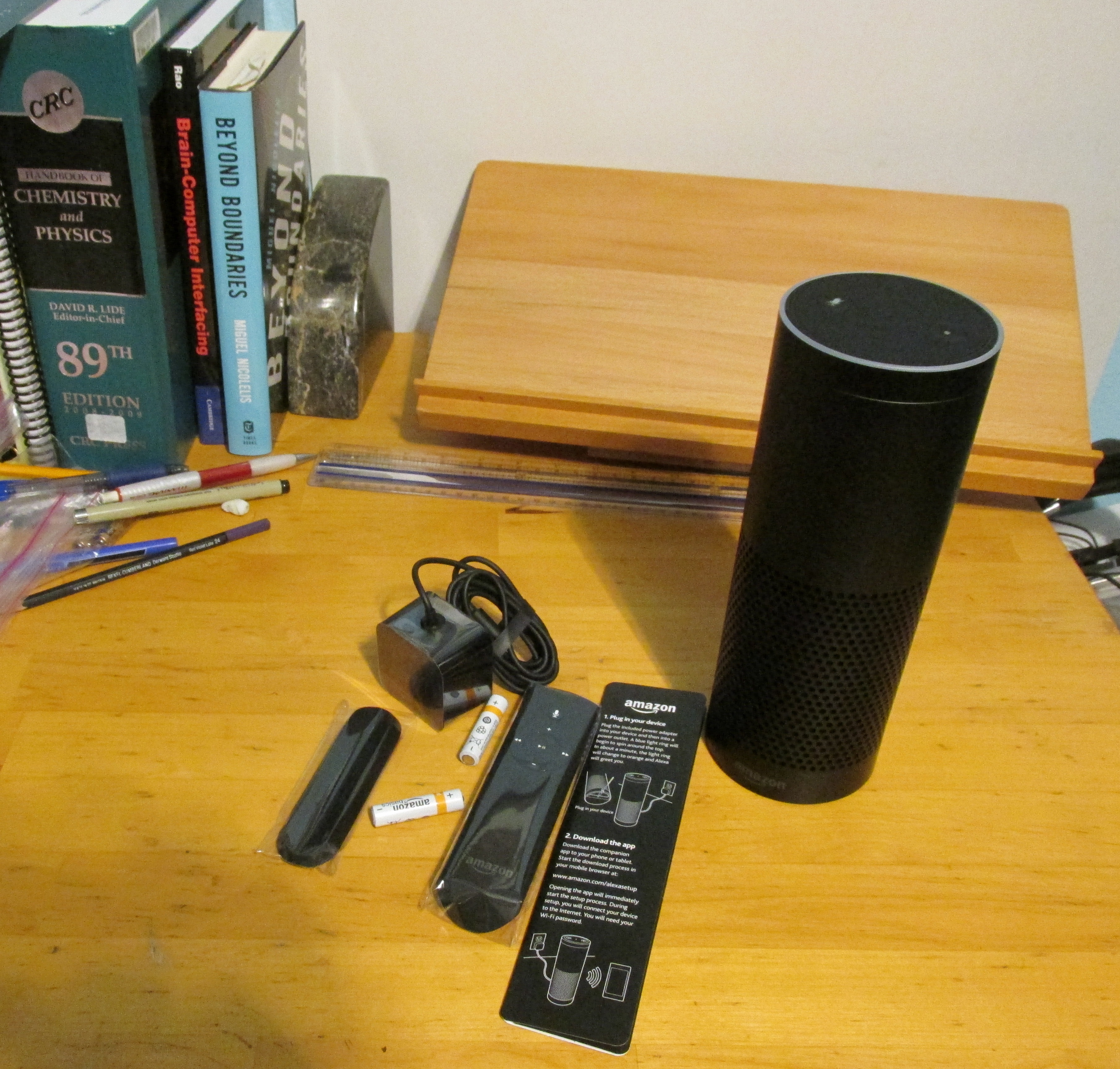
- Amazon Echo unpacked, January 2015
- Released: November 6, 2014 (Amazon Prime and invited members); June 23, 2015 (released in the U.S.); September 28, 2016 (released in the U.K.); October 26, 2016 (released in Germany)
- Introductory price: US$179.99 £149.99; EUR€179.99
- Connectivity: Wi-Fi and Bluetooth
- Website: Amazon Echo (US); Amazon Echo (UK); Amazon Echo (Germany)

Amazon Echo (second generation)
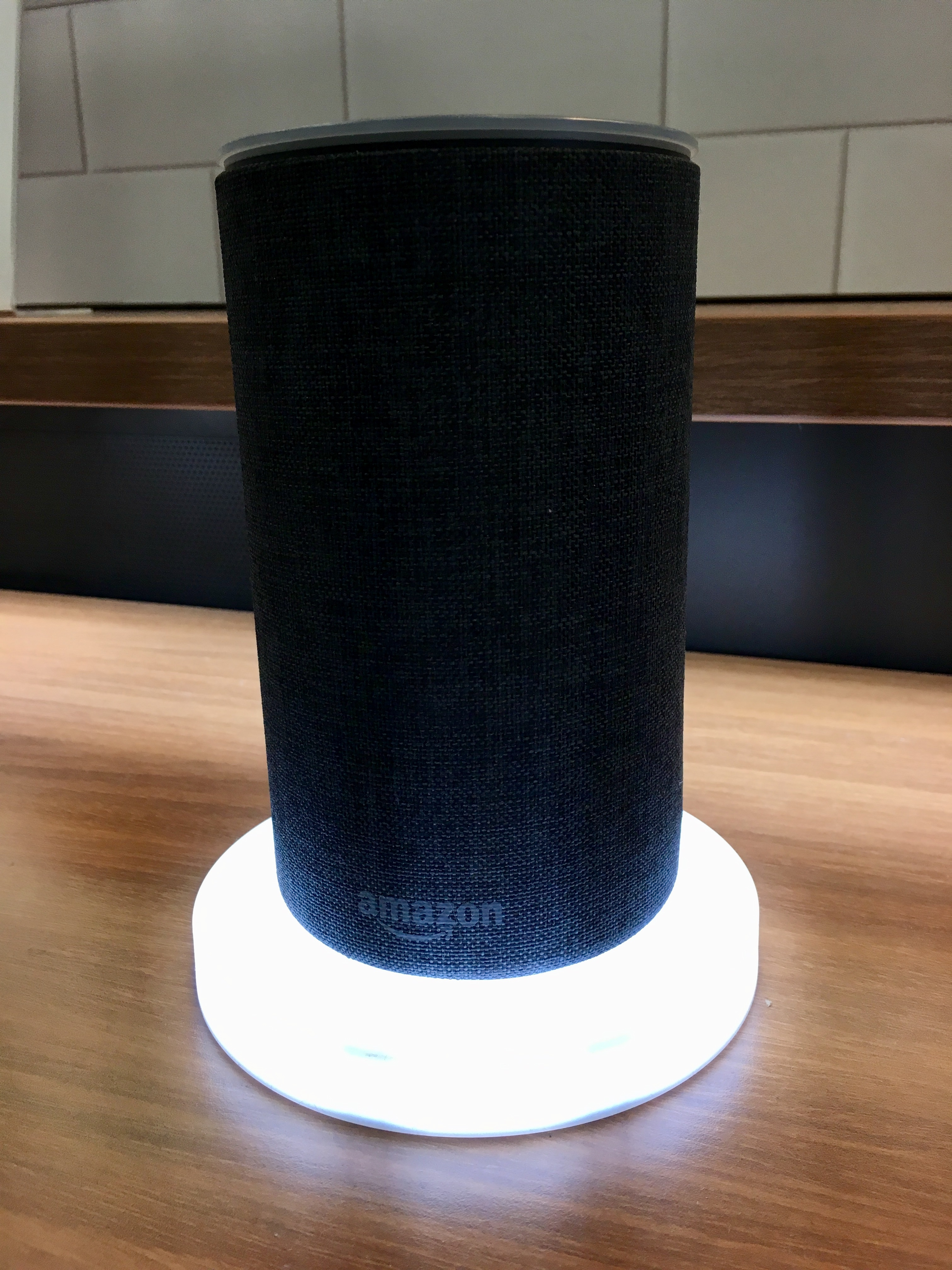
- Released: October 31, 2017 (released in the U.S.)
- Introductory price: US$99.99
- Connectivity: Wi-Fi and Bluetooth
- Website: Amazon Echo (US); Amazon Echo (UK); Amazon Echo (Germany); Amazon Echo (India); Amazon Echo (Canada)

The first-generation Amazon Echo consists of a 9.25 inches (23.5 cm) tall cylinder speaker with a seven-piece microphone array. The Echo hardware complement includes a Texas Instruments DM3725 ARM Cortex-A8 processor, 256MB of LPDDR1 RAM and 4GB of storage space. As of July 2017, the first-generation Echo maintained an 83% score on GearCaliber, a review aggregator.

Although the Echo is intended to be voice-controlled at the unit, a microphone-enabled remote control similar to the one bundled with the Amazon Fire TV is available for purchase. The remote was also bundled with early units. An action button on top of the unit is provided for user setup in a new location, and the mute button allows the microphones to be turned off. The top half-inch of the unit rotates to increase or decrease the speaker volume. The Echo must be plugged in to operate since it has no internal battery.

Echo provides dual-band Wi-Fi 802.11a/b/g/n and Bluetooth Advanced Audio Distribution Profile (A2DP) support for audio streaming and Audio/Video Remote Control Profile (AVRCP) for voice control of connected mobile devices.

The mainline Linux kernel is able to boot the Amazon Echo since version 5.6.

In September 2020, the 4th gen Echo was announced replacing the Echo and Echo Plus devices in a new spherical form-factor. The Echo brings the Echo Plus' Zigbee smart home hub with support for Amazon Sidewalk.

==== Limited editions ====
As part of a holiday promotion, Seattle Seahawks player Marshawn Lynch drove the Treasure Truck around Seattle in December 2016 selling a limited-edition beast-mode Echo with a custom skin. The beast-mode version was a first-generation Echo that responded to a user's commands with Marshawn Lynch's voice, instead of the Alexa voice.

In November 2017, a Product Red version of the second-generation Echo was announced as a limited edition item.

Another special version of Echo is the Alexa Super Skills Collectible edition, which was given to select Amazon Alexa developers who published five skills between July 22 and October 30, 2017. This special variant comes with a white mask, a blue cape, and a blue belt.

==== Availability ====
Amazon initially limited the first-generation Echo to Amazon Prime members or just by invitation, but it became widely available in the United States in mid 2015. In 2016, the Echo became available in the United Kingdom and Germany.

As of December 2017, the Echo was available in more than 80 countries: Albania, Austria, Anguilla, Argentina, Australia, Barbados, Belarus, Belgium, Bolivia, Bosnia and Herzegovina, Bulgaria, Cambodia, Canada, Chile, Colombia, Costa Rica, Croatia, Cyprus, the Czech Republic, Denmark Ecuador, El Salvador, Estonia, Finland, Ghana, Germany, Greece, Grenada, Hong Kong, Indonesia, Jamaica, Kenya, Hungary, Iceland, India, Ireland, Italy, Japan, Latvia, Liechtenstein, Lithuania, Luxembourg, Macao, Malaysia, Malta, Mexico, Namibia, the Netherlands, New Zealand, North Macedonia, Norway, Panama, Peru, Philippines, Panama, Peru, Poland, Portugal, Puerto Rico, Romania, Saint Kitts and Nevis, Serbia, Singapore, Slovakia, Slovenia, South Korea, Sri Lanka, Suriname, Sweden, Switzerland, Taiwan, Tanzania, Thailand, Trinidad and Tobago, Turkey, the United Kingdom, the United States, Uruguay, Vanuatu, Venezuela and Zambia.

In 2018, Amazon and Microsoft jointly announced a solution to integrate their digital assistants so that Cortana, Microsoft's voice assistant, could be called from an Amazon Echo device and Alexa could be called from Windows devices, including PCs. In January 2019, Microsoft CEO Satya Nadella announced that Cortana would no longer be a platform competitor to Alexa or Google Assistant, but rather a voice skill to access Microsoft 365 via other voice assistants. As of April 2019, Alexa was the only Cortana-integrated voice assistant, which gave it exclusive access to Microsoft's suite of business applications.

=== Echo Dot ===
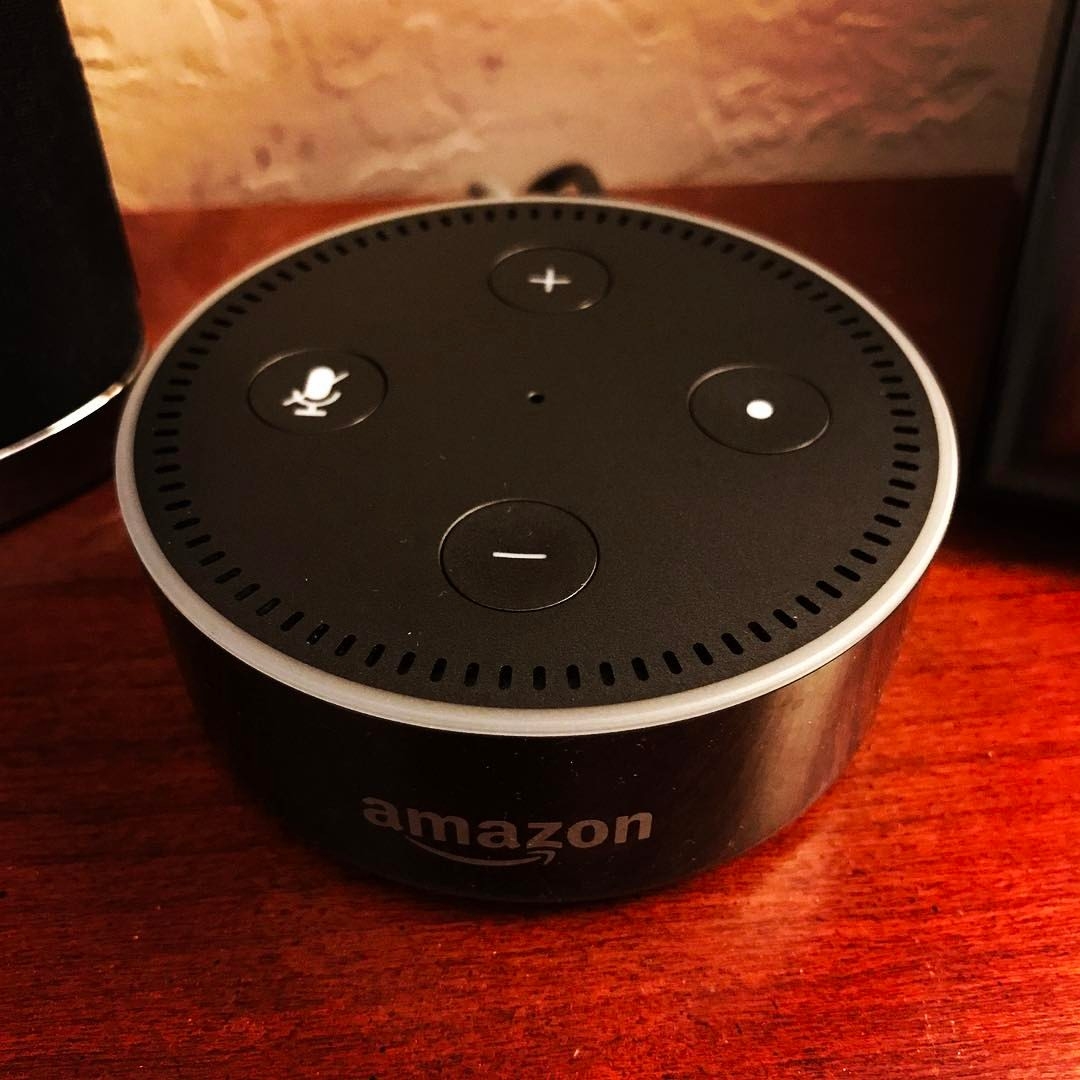
The black Amazon Echo Dot (second generation) sitting idle on a wood surface

==== First generation ====
In March 2016, Amazon unveiled the original Amazon Echo Dot, which is a hockey puck-sized version of the Echo designed to be connected to external speakers due to the smaller size of the onboard speakers, or to be used in rooms such as the bedroom as an alternative to the full-sized Echo. Despite its smaller form factor, the Amazon Echo Dot retains all the core functionalities of the original Amazon Echo, ensuring a seamless voice-controlled experience for users.

Additionally, users have the option to enhance the portability of the Echo Dot with third-party external batteries, providing extended usage on the go.

==== Second generation ====
The second generation of the Amazon Echo Dot became available on October 20, 2016. It is priced lower, has improved voice recognition, and is available in black, grey and white. The Echo Spatial Perception (ESP) technology allows several Echo and Dot units to work together so that only one device answers the request, improving responsiveness and reducing conflicts between devices. the Echo Dot maintained a 78% score on GearCaliber, based on 23 reviews. Users can also update their Echo Dot to the latest firmware to ensure ESP and other features function optimally.

On August 18, 2017, an Amazon promotion allowed Amazon Prime customers to receive a 100% price reduction on the Echo Dot.

==== Third generation ====
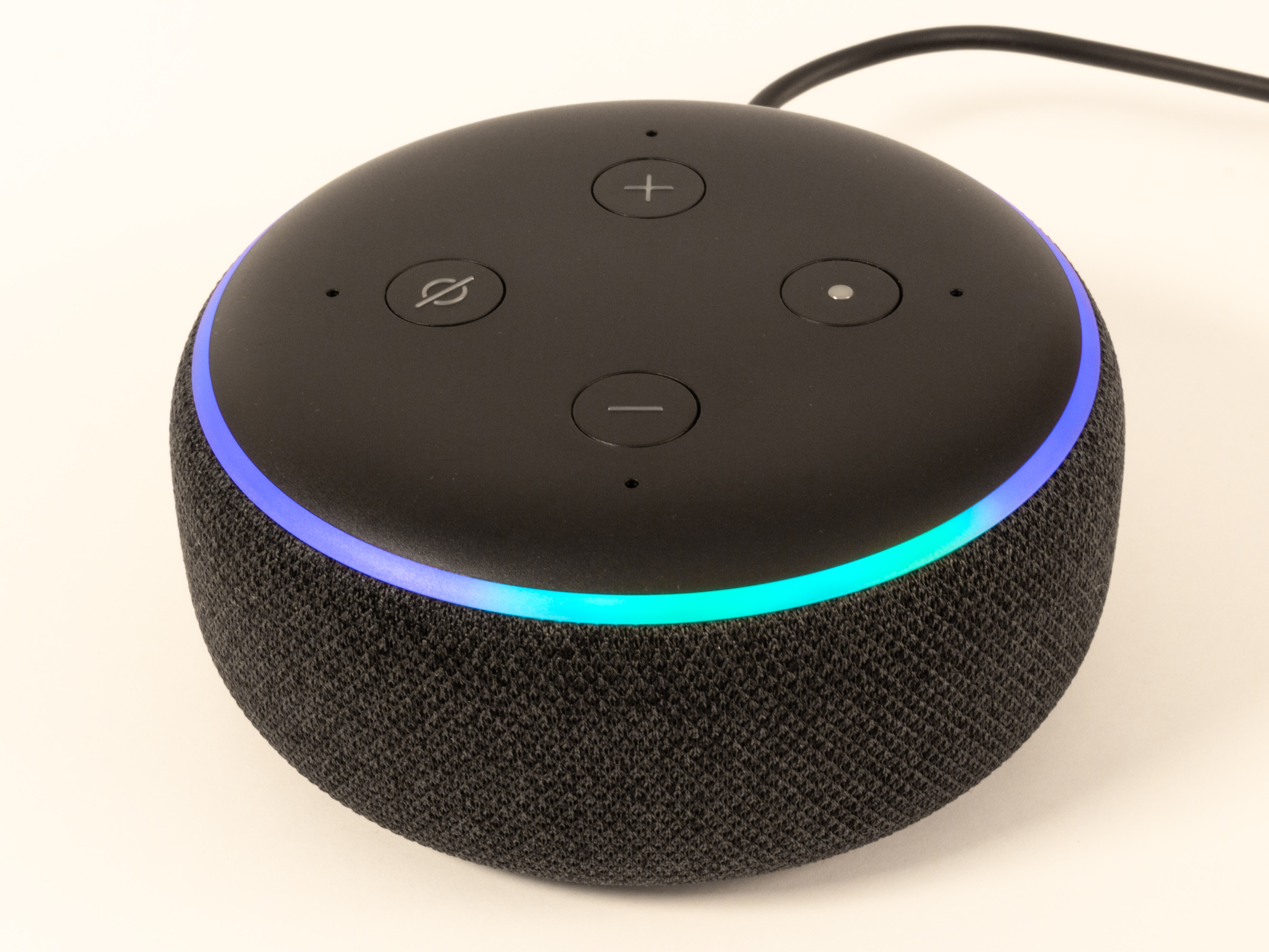
Third-generation Echo Dot

The third-generation Echo Dot, introduced in September 2018, featured a new design with fabric covers, departing from the previous plastic or metal cylinder design. These fabric-covered Echo Dots also incorporated upgraded speaker drivers while retaining their core functionalities, including 3.5 millimeter audio output.

In January 2019, Amazon's SVP of devices and services, Dave Limp, revealed that over 100 million Alexa-enabled devices had been sold. The company's earnings reports and press releases also reveal that the Echo Dot has been among the top-selling products on Amazon.com for 2017 and 2018.

==== Fourth generation ====
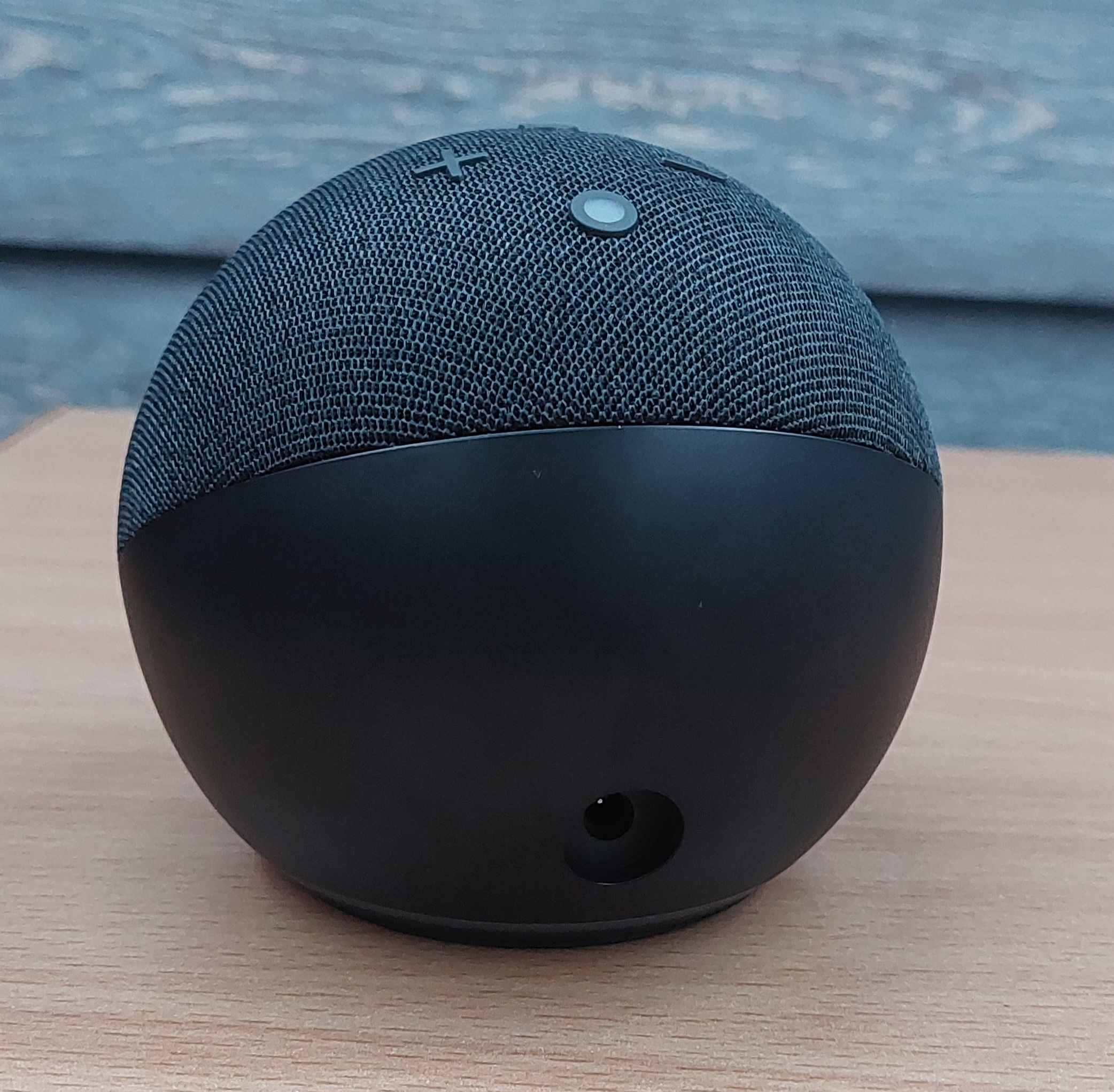
Spherical fourth- and fifth-generation Echo Dot; the fifth generation, as shown, lacks the external speaker jack.

In September 2020, the fourth-generation Echo Dot was revealed with a new spherical design that was 30 percent smaller than the third-generation Echo.

It features built-in Eero technology that provides Wi-Fi extender capability in a mesh-network.

==== Fifth generation ====
In September 2022, the fifth-generation Echo Dot introduced several enhancements, including a new temperature sensor, improved audio with clearer vocals and deeper bass, and cutting-edge ultrasonic motion detection technology. This model lacks the external speaker jack.

==== Echo Dot Max (1st generation) ====
On September 30, 2025, Amazon announced an upgraded version of the Echo Dot, known as the Echo Dot Max, which serves as the de facto replacement of the fourth-generation Amazon Echo, despite costing the same as the regular Echo and sharing the same size as the regular Dot.

6th generation

In November 2026, Amazon released the Echo Dot 6th gen, using a similar design as the 5th gen, with some upgrades and tweaks, like a smaller light bar, a new button design, and more.

=== Amazon Tap ===
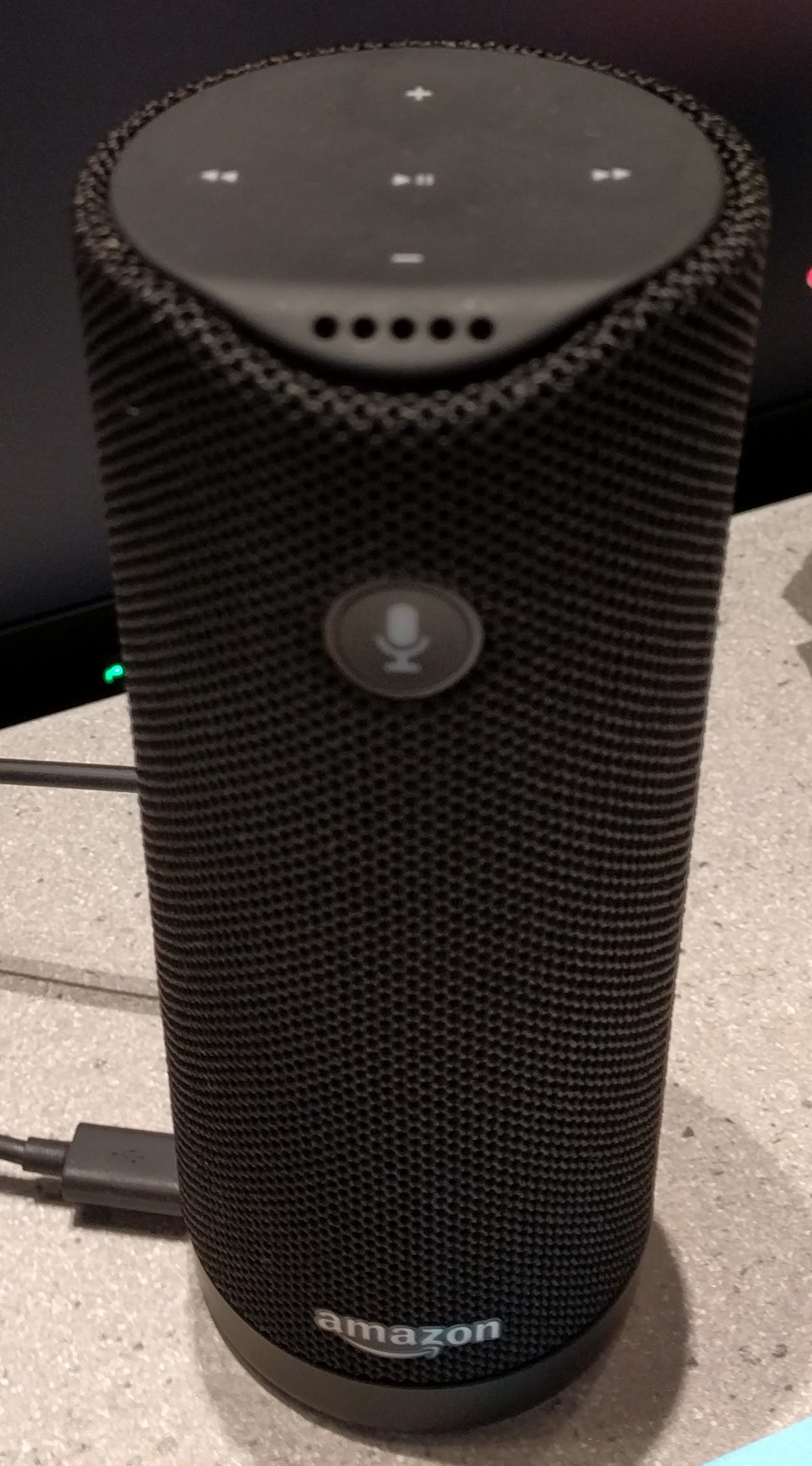
The Amazon Tap

The Amazon Tap is a smaller portable version of the Echo. The Tap can do the many things the Echo can do; however, as it is battery-powered, it is also portable. Initially, the user had to press an activation button on the front of the Tap to speak commands. However, a February 2017 software update allows the option of activating the Tap with an activation word, just like the Echo and the Dot. Some of the limitations of the Tap include not being able to stream music as part of a group and not being able to send announcements to the device. Additionally the Tap does not support "Drop In" feature and as a result cannot be used for two-way voice communication. Amazon has discontinued the Tap. This has encouraged 3rd party accessory manufacturers to make available battery add-on units for other Echo products.

=== Echo Look ===
In April 2017, the Amazon Echo Look was introduced as a camera with Alexa built-in, for US$20 more than the first-generation Echo. The device can provide artificial intelligence outfit recommendations, take photos, and record videos; in addition to the features available on the Echo. It offers Amazon Alexa's key feature plus a camera to take full-length photos and 360-degree videos with built-in AI for fashion advice. As a consumer product, it helps catalog users' outfits and rates their looks based on "machine learning algorithms with advice from fashion specialists.

The device was initially only available for purchase by invitation-only in the U.S. However, it became generally available on June 6, 2018. Three years later, Echo Look owners received an email from Amazon stating that the device would soon stop working, because Amazon was discontinuing production and sales of the device. Echo Look owners then had a device that they could not use.

=== Echo Show ===
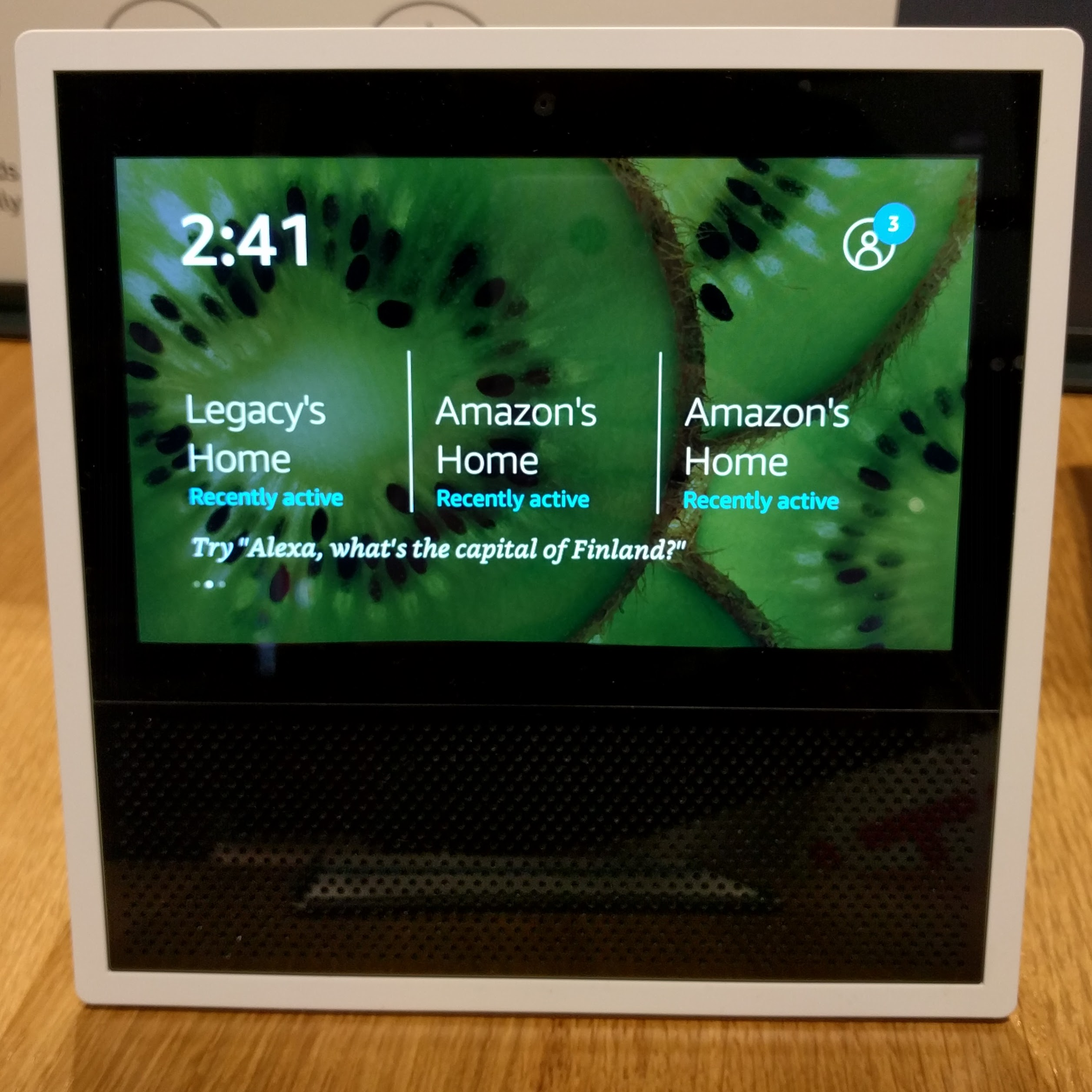
The Amazon Echo Show

In May 2017, Amazon introduced the Echo Show, which features a tactile 7-inch liquid-crystal display screen that can be used for playing media, making video calls (5 MP front camera), and other features. The Echo Show was offered for purchase at a price of $229.99 on June 28, 2017, and was initially only available in the U.S.

A second generation of the Echo Show was unveiled at an Alexa-themed product event by Amazon on September 20, 2018, for release the following month. The newest Echo Show has a 16 inch (406mm) touchscreen, which is 40% thinner and offers 10% more viewing area, improved audio system, with 8 custom micro woofers, and a new 3D Alexa smart home map. Amazon has released six additional sizes of the Echo Show making them available in 5, 8, 11, 15, 16, and 21-inch displays. These devices broke the tradition where numbers indicate which generation the device belongs to. They are known as the Echo Show 5, Echo Show 8,, Echo Show 11, Echo Show 15, Echo Show 16, and Echo Show 21.

=== Echo Spot ===
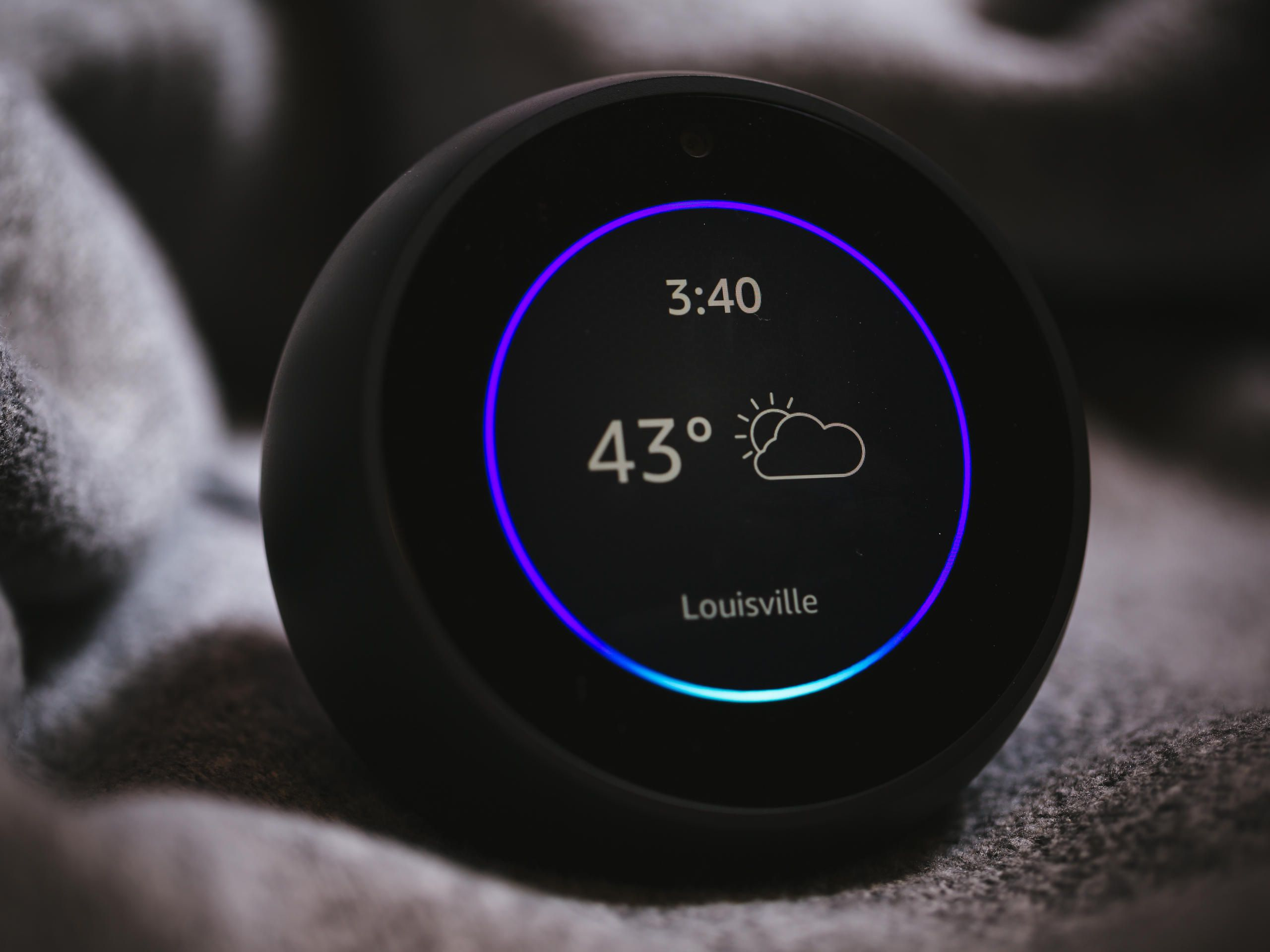
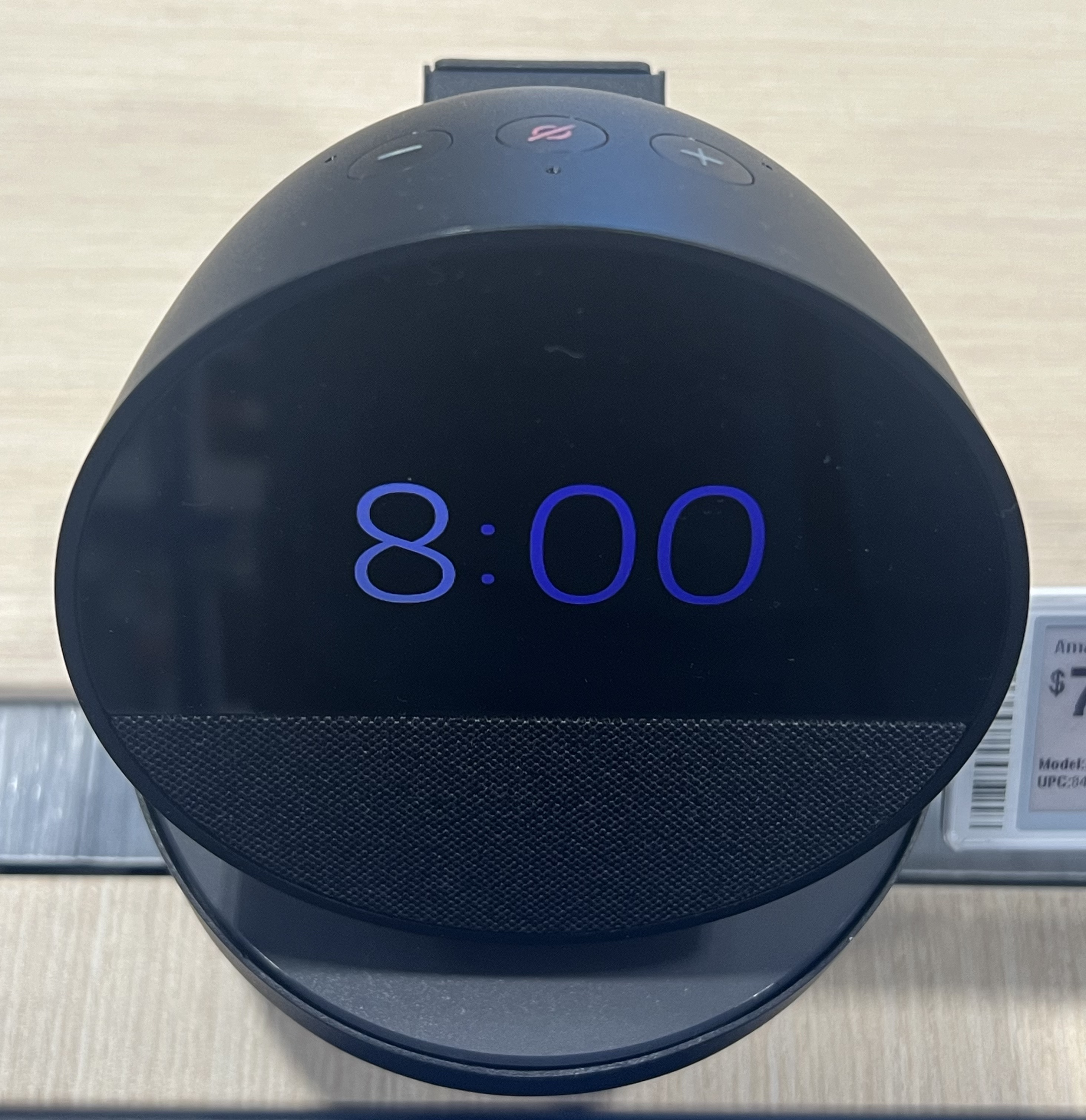
Left: The original 2017 Amazon Echo Spot
Right: The relaunched 2024 Amazon Echo Spot

On September 27, 2017, Amazon launched the Echo Spot, a hemispherical device that has the same functions as an Echo Show. The device has a 2.5 inches (64 mm) circular screen, and looks like an alarm clock. The device sold for $129.99. In 2019, the Echo Spot has been discontinued in all regions. On July 9, 2024, Amazon brought back the Echo Spot, but with a different design. The device now resembles the look of the Echo Pop, with a 2.83" inch touch screen with a half-circle tinted cover glass and a speaker. Unlike the 2017 version, videocalling and smart home cameras are not available on the device. The device sold for $79.99. In November 2026, the Echo Spot was completely replaced with the Echo Time, with a similar design to the 1st gen Echo Spot.

=== Echo Plus ===
On September 27, 2017, Amazon announced the Echo Plus, which released on October 31, 2017. It shares design similarities with the first-generation Echo, but also doubles as a smart home hub, connecting to most common wireless protocols to control connected smart devices within a home. It incorporates seven second-generation far field microphones and noise cancellation, while also supporting Dolby Sound.

In September 2018, a second-generation Echo Plus was released. The new version has a fabric covering and includes an embedded temperature sensor. The Echo Plus has since been discontinued in 2020.

=== Echo Flex ===
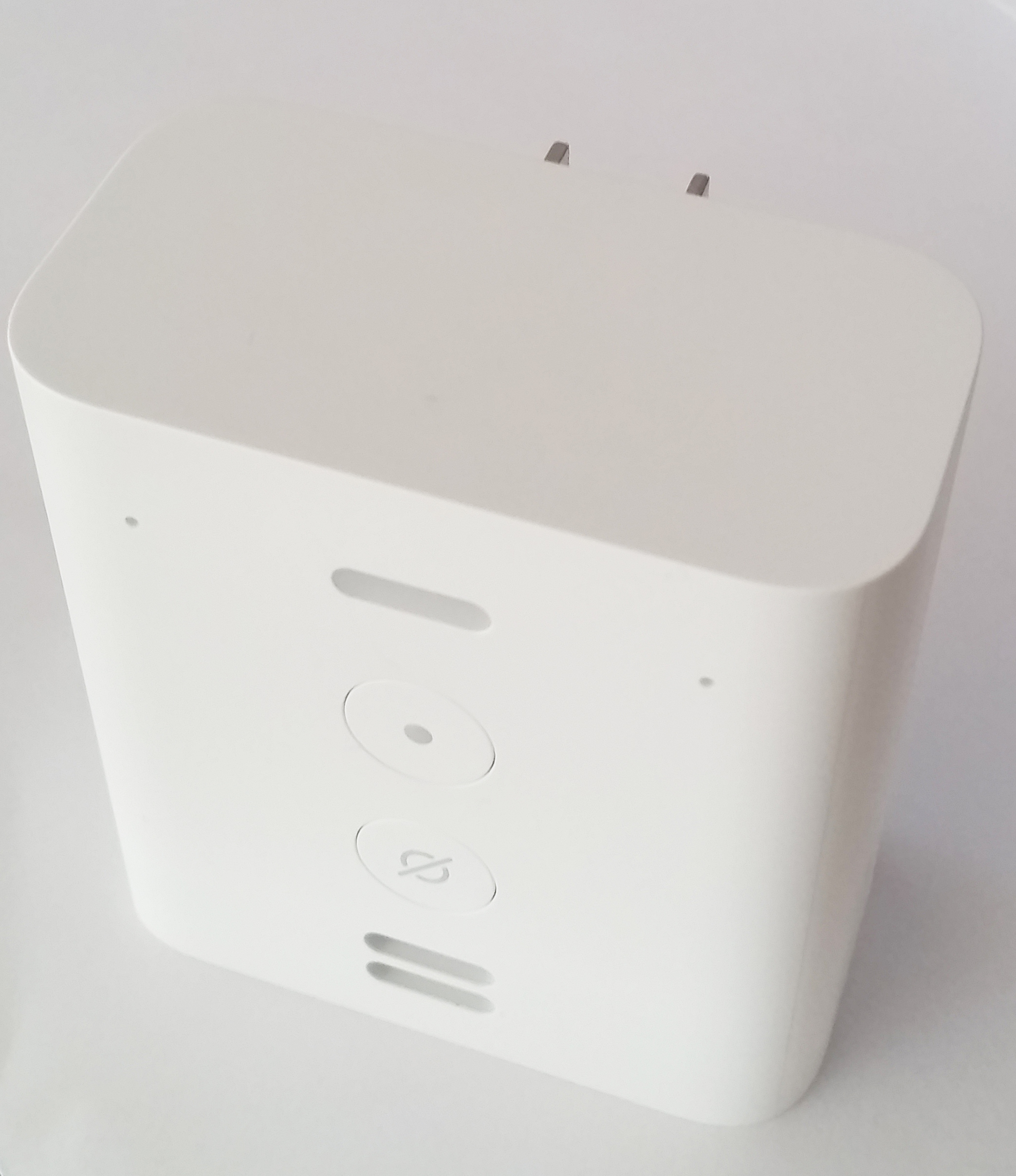
The Amazon Echo Flex

On November 14, 2019, Amazon released the Echo Flex for $24.99. It is a small device with a speaker that can be plugged directly into a wall outlet. It has a full-sized USB Type-A port into the bottom to charge other devices or into which additional accessories, such as a motion sensor, can be plugged. The Echo Plug has been discontinued, but is compatible with Alexa+.

=== Echo Studio ===
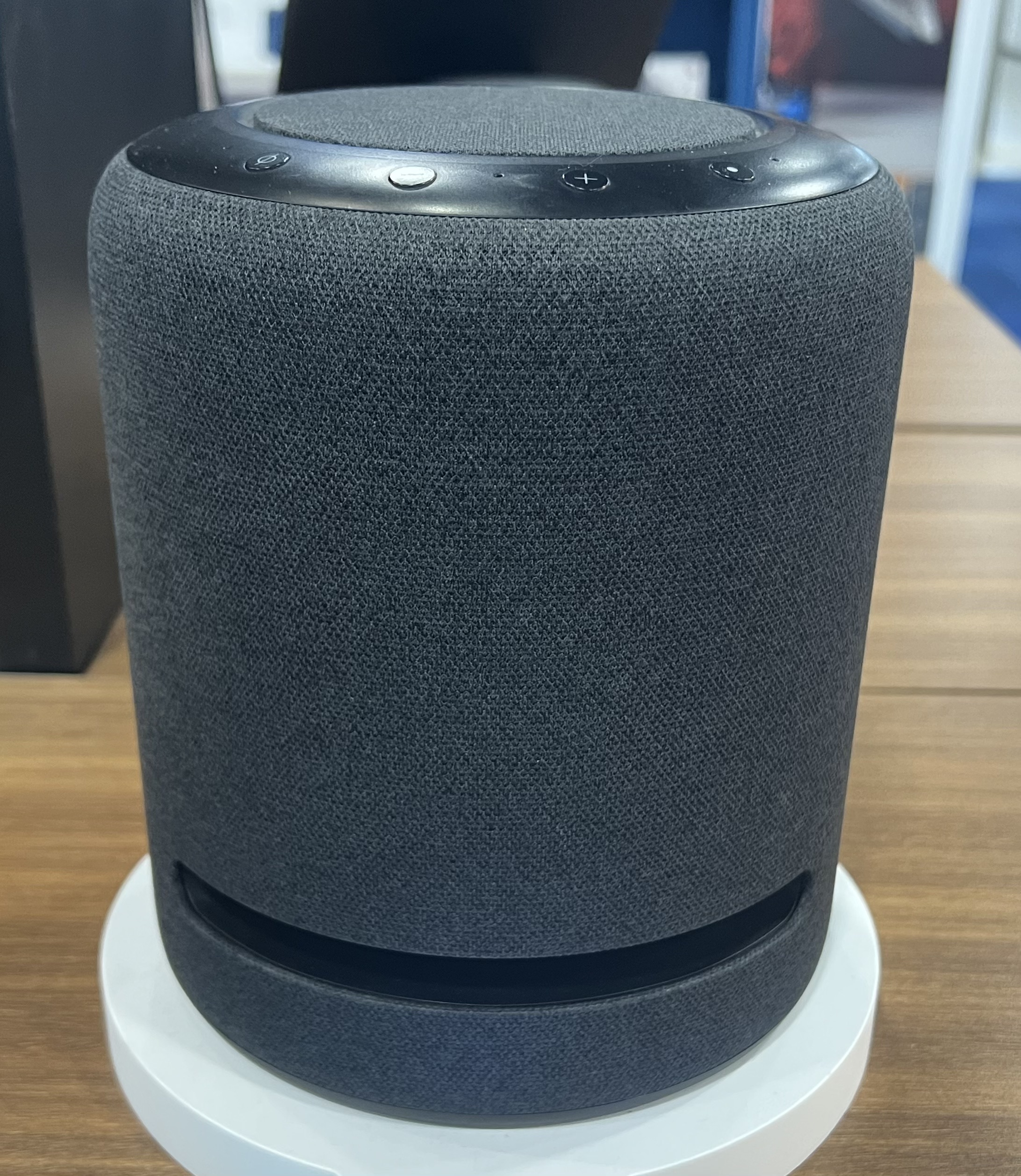
Amazon Echo Studio (1st generation)

In November 2019, Amazon introduced Echo Studio, a Dolby Atmos-compatible surround sound Alexa speaker. Compared to other Alexa speakers, it was the biggest and the loudest.

In October 2025, Amazon released a second-generation version of the Studio, which is 40% smaller than its predecessor.

In November 2026, Amazon released a kind of third-generation version of the Studio, with the same design, but just with a camera built into it.

=== Echo Pop ===
On May 31, 2023, Amazon released the Echo Pop for $39.99, making it the cheapest Echo model. It is the most compact model in the Echo lineup, and is smaller than the Echo Dot, with a hemispherical design and a flat front face, which is meant to make it fit in more areas.

The Echo Pop generally received favourable reviews. Its design has been praised, and reviewers have regarded it as a good model for small rooms and situations where higher audio quality is not needed.

Echo Time

In November of 2026, Amazon replaced the Echo Spot for a similar device called the Echo Time. The Echo Time is apparently Amazon’s first smart alarm clock with Alexa+ built in. The Echo Time has a 3.2 inch screen, which is about the same size as the first generation Echo Spot, a 6 inch sphere sized speaker with a mesh fabric exterior and flat bottom, no cameras for privacy, sunset style alarms, and ultrasound based wearable free sleep sensing which is opt in only, with an option to disable.

=== Speakerless devices ===
At an Alexa-themed product launch event in September 2018, Amazon announced an Echo device designed for cars. The device connects with the user's smartphone over Bluetooth and offers driving direction, in addition to other Alexa functionality. Echo Auto became available as an invite-only product to US customers near the end of 2018.

The Echo Input is an Alexa device without internal speakers. For audio output, it must be connected to an external speaker by cord or Bluetooth. The Echo Link is a higher-end version of the Echo Input, with additional output ports and a volume knob. The Echo Link Amp has the same controls of the Link, but with an amplifier.

=== Accessories ===
Along with the second-generation Echo, Amazon announced two new accessories. The Echo Buttons can be used while playing games on Echo devices, such as Jeopardy!. The Echo Connect is a small adapter that plugs into any Echo and a home phone line, allowing the Echo to make voice calls through a home phone number.

In September 2018, Amazon announced the Echo Sub, a subwoofer that connects to other Echo speakers, and the Echo Wall Clock, which can display how much time is remaining on timers set with an Echo device.

=== Wearable ===
Amazon announced the Echo Loop in September 2019, a smart ring with a button that activates Alexa. The Echo Loop uses Bluetooth to connect to a smartphone for Internet access. The Echo Frames smartglasses, which support prescription lenses, were also announced on the same day. In 2020, it was announced that Echo Loop would be discontinued. On September 20, 2023, Amazon unveiled the third generation of Echo Frames and a collaboration with Carrera Eyewear on two frame designs.

In October 15, 2026, Amazon released a similar product to the Echo Loop called the Bee Frontier. The Bee Frontier is a smart wristband or AI wearable with 3 colours, a week’s worth battery life, an IP67 rating, USB-C charging, dual microphones for capturing audio, Alexa+, and supports up to 40 languages for a small price of $79.99.

== Privacy concerns ==
Concerns have been raised about the remote access by Echo devices to private conversations in the home, or other non-verbal indications that can identify the presence or absence of individuals, based on audible cues such as footstep cadence or radio and television programming. Amazon responds to these concerns by stating that Echo only streams recordings from the user's home when the wake word activates the device.

Echo uses past voice recordings that the user has sent to the cloud service to improve response to future questions the user may pose. To address privacy concerns, the user can delete voice recordings that are currently associated with the user's account, but doing so may degrade the user's experience using voice search. To delete these recordings, the user can visit the "Manage My Device" page on Amazon.com or contact Amazon customer service. In May 2018, it was reported that an Echo device had sent a recorded conversation to an acquaintance of a user who did not intend for this to happen. Amazon apologized and conjectured that one part of the conversation had been misinterpreted as a command to distribute it.

Echo uses an address set in the Alexa companion app when it needs a location. Amazon and third-party apps and websites use location information to provide location-based services and store this information to provide voice services, the Maps app, Find Your Device, and to monitor the performance and accuracy of location services. For example, Echo voice services use the user's location to respond to the user's requests for nearby restaurants or stores. Similarly, Echo uses the user's location to process the user's mapping-related requests and improve the Maps experience. All information collected is subject to the Amazon.com Privacy Notice.

Amazon retains digital recordings of users' audio spoken after the "wake up word", and while the audio recordings are subject to demands by law enforcement, government agents, and other entities via subpoena, Amazon publishes some information about the warrants it receives, the subpoenas it receives, and some of the warrant-less demands it receives, allowing customers some indication as to the percentage of illegal demands for customer information it receives.

As Amazon employed ex-US-security-chief Gen Keith B. Alexander in autumn 2020, Edward Snowden commented laconically: "It turns out 'Hey Alexa' is short for 'Hey Keith Alexander."

=== Echo data as criminal evidence ===
During the course of the investigation into the November 22, 2015, death of Victor Collins in the home of James Andrew Bates in Bentonville, Arkansas, police sought the data stored on the Amazon Echo on the premises as evidence, but were refused by Amazon. The conflict was resolved when Bates consented to the release of his personal information that was held by the company.

=== Concerns relating to in-car smart systems ===
In February 2017, Luke Millanta successfully demonstrated how an Echo could be connected to, and used to control, a Tesla Model S. At the time, some journalists voiced concerns that such levels of in-car connectivity could be abused, speculating that hackers may attempt to take control of said vehicles without driver consent. Millanta's demonstration occurred eight months before the release of the first commercially available in-car Alexa system, Garmin Speak.

== Limitations ==
Purchasing merchandise in the categories of apparel, shoes, jewelry, and watches is not available. In addition, Amazon Prime Pantry, Prime Now, or Add-On items are not supported by Alexa's ordering function, while the shopping list function allows no more than one item to be added at a time.

Echo has provided inconsistent responses when asked common questions to which users would expect better answers. Echo sometimes confuses certain homophones.

== See also ==
- Google Nest
- HomePod
- INVOKE
