= Daniel Pedoe =

English-born mathematician and geometer

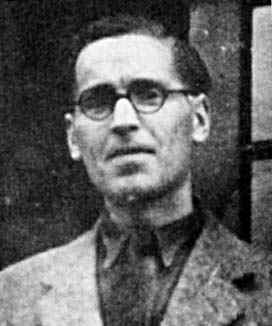
- Born: Daniel Pedoe; 29 October 1910; London, UK
- Died: 27 October 1998 (aged 88); Saint Paul, Minnesota, U.S.
- Scientific career
- Fields: Mathematician and geometer

Dan Pedoe (29 October 1910 – 27 October 1998)) was an English-born mathematician and geometer with a career spanning more than six decades.

Over his career, he authored approximately 50 research and expository papers in geometry. He also authored several books on mathematics and geometry, a few of which remained in print for decades and were translated into several languages, including the three-volume Methods of Algebraic Geometry, which he co-authored with W. V. D. Hodge, The Gentle Art of Mathematics, Circles: A Mathematical View, Geometry and the Visual Arts, and Japanese Temple Geometry Problems: San Gaku, which he co-authored with Hidetoshi Fukagawa).

== Early life and education ==
Pedoe was born in London, on 29 October 1910, the youngest of thirteen children of Szmul Abramski, a Jewish immigrant from Poland who found himself in London in the 1890s: he had boarded a cattle boat not knowing whether it was bound for New York or London, so his final destination was one of blind chance. Pedoe's mother, Ryfka Raszka Pedowicz, was the only child of Wolf Pedowicz, a corn merchant and his wife, Sarah Haimnovna Pecheska from Łomża then in Congress Poland (that part of Poland then under Russian control). The family name requires some explanation. The father, Abramski, was one of the Kohanim, a priestly group, and once in Britain, he changed his surname to Cohen. At first, all thirteen children took the surname Cohen, but later, to avoid any potential antisemitism, some of the Cohen children changed their surname to Pedoe, a contraction of their mother's maiden name; this happened while Daniel was at school, aged 12.

He was the youngest child in a family of thirteen children and his childhood was spent in relative poverty in the East End of London, despite their father being a skilled cabinetmaker. He attended the Central Foundation Boys' School where he was first influenced in his love of geometry by the headmaster Norman M. Gibbins and a textbook by Godfrey and Siddons. While still at school, Pedoe published his first paper, The geometric interpretation of Cagnoli's equation: sin b sin c + cos b cos c cos A = sin B sin C – cos B cos C cos a; it appeared in the Mathematical Gazette in 1929. He was successful at the "ten plus" examination and subsequently won a Scholarship to study mathematics at University of Cambridge.

== Career ==
=== University of Cambridge ===
During his first three years at Magdalene College, Cambridge, where he was a scholar, Pedoe was tutored in mathematics by Arthur Stanley Ramsey, the father of Frank P. Ramsey. He attended lectures by Ludwig Wittgenstein and Bertrand Russell, although he was unimpressed by the teaching style of either great man. Geometry became his main interest and, advised by Henry Baker, he started work on his doctorate and published several papers.

In 1935, he attended the Institute for Advanced Study in Princeton, New Jersey, where he worked with Solomon Lefschetz.

=== University of Southampton and Freeman Dyson ===
After returning to England in 1936, Pedoe was appointed as an assistant lecturer of the mathematics department at the University College, Southampton. More of his papers were published and after(?) 1937, he was awarded his PhD on the strength of his thesis, The Exceptional Curves on an Algebraic Surface, which was based on Henry Baker's work on the Italian theory of algebraic surfaces; he was examined by W. V. D. Hodge and Baker at Cambridge.

In the late 1930s, Pedoe married Mary Tunstall, an English geographer and the couple had a daughter, Naomi, and identical twin sons, Dan and Hugh, born in December 1939.

By 1941, Winchester College had lost several teachers to the army and had become unable to meet its teaching commitments. They requested help and Pedoe was asked to assist with the teaching of mathematics. He taught junior and senior classes (the juniors could be unruly) and in the senior class one of the students was Freeman Dyson who showed enormous early talent and was strongly encouraged by Pedoe with extra work and reading. Their friendship lasted more than fifty more years until Pedoe's death in 1998 and Dyson's list of people who have most influenced him begins "Hardy, Pedoe...".

In 1941 a collaboration with W. V. D. Hodge started which lasted some twelve years and included the writing of the huge three-volume work, Methods of Algebraic Geometry. Although the book was originally designed as a geometric counterpart of G. H. Hardy's A Course of Pure Mathematics it was never intended as a textbook and contains original material. First published in the 1940s, all three volumes were reprinted by Cambridge University Press in 1995.

Pedoe published three more papers in 1942: A remark on a property of a special pencil of quadrics, On some geometrical inequalities and An inequality for two triangles.

=== Birmingham University and Westfield College ===
In 1942, Pedoe moved to Birmingham for a lectureship at the University of Birmingham, working mainly in engineering mathematics. The family were not happy there, the local air pollution affected his children and Pedoe did not like the working environment. The professor of mathematical physics at Birmingham was Rudolf Peierls, who was working on the British project to develop the atomic bomb; he suggested to Pedoe that he, Pedoe, should do some war-work. He did so, and worked part-time to improve piston rings so as to emulate German dive-bombing tactics.

In 1947 he moved to Westfield College, part of the University of London, as a reader in mathematics. Once again, he was unhappy, both from domestic and professional points of view: his salary was insufficient for him to afford to buy a family home and he found the working environment to be "a strain".

=== Khartoum and Singapore ===
Encouraged by Mary to look abroad, he was appointed as head of the mathematics department at the University of Khartoum in the Sudan and took up the role in 1952 on trial basis with leave of absence from Westfield College. When Westfield pressed for firm decision, he resigned and stayed at Khartoum for seven years: the length of his contract. It was during this period that he wrote many of his books including The Gentle Art of Mathematics, Circles and a textbook, An Introduction to projective geometry.

Pedoe found the time at Khartoum to his taste; there was a comfortable life-style that allowed him to write and the family joined him each Christmas. Eventually, Mary stayed with him permanently, the children remaining in England.

In 1959, he was appointed as head of the mathematics department at the University of Singapore by Sir Alexander Oppenheim.

=== Purdue and Minnesota ===
Unwilling to retire at 55, the statutory retirement age in Singapore, he moved again, to Indiana in 1962, to take up a position at Purdue University, near Lafayette. Although the location was somewhat isolated, there was an active social life and he was kept busy. One of the positions he held there was as Senior Mathematician to the Minnesota College Geometry Project, which was to improve geometry teaching in high schools and colleges by making films and writing accompanying books.

After two years at Purdue, he was appointed as a professor at the University of Minnesota where he stayed until he retired in 1980, when he was made professor emeritus. He won a Lester R. Ford Award in 1968.

=== San Gaku ===
Pedoe's interest and work continued after his retirement and in 1984 he was approached by Hidetoshi Fukagawa, a high-school teacher in Aichi, Japan. Fukagawa had tried unsuccessfully to interest Japanese academics in San Gaku – Japanese wooden tablets containing geometric theorems which had hung in temples and shrines for around two centuries as offerings to the gods.

A collaboration started which resulted in the publication of the book, Japanese Temple Geometry Problems by the Charles Babbage Research Centre in Canada. The book succeeded in arousing interest in this uniquely Japanese form of mathematics.

== Death ==
In 1998, Pedoe died at age 88 in Saint Paul, Minnesota following an extended period of failing health. He was survived by his twin sons, Dan and Hugh Tunstall-Pedoe, and six grandchildren, including William Tunstall-Pedoe.

== Bibliography ==
- Methods of Algebraic Geometry (3 volumes)
- Circles (republished as Circles: a Mathematical View)
- A Course of Geometry for Colleges and Universities (republished as Geometry: A Comprehensive Course)
- A Geometric Introduction to Linear Algebra
- Geometry and the Liberal Arts (republished as Geometry and the Visual Arts)
- The Gentle Art of Mathematics

Pedoe's papers and correspondence are archived at the University of Birmingham.

== See also ==
- Pedoe's inequality
- Sangaku
- W. V. D. Hodge
