= Dan Tunstall Pedoe =

British cardiologist

Dan Tunstall Pedoe (30 December 1939 – 13 February 2015), known as "Dr Dan" and the "father of marathon medicine", was an English cardiologist who developed pioneering methods of diagnosis. He is popularly known for his contributions to sports medicine, particularly his support of the London Marathon.

== Family and education ==
Tunstall Pedoe was the son of the academic mathematician and geometer Daniel Pedoe and Mary Tunstall. His twin brother, Hugh, was also a cardiologist, but who worked in teaching. The brothers and their elder sister, Naomi, were born when their father was an assistant lecturer at Southampton University. For much of the children's childhood, their father worked abroad, in Khartoum and Singapore, although the family spent Christmasses together.

The twins were educated at Haberdashers' Aske's School, at the time located in Hampstead, and Dulwich College. They attended King's College, Cambridge, together. Dan studied at St Bartholomew's Hospital in London and earned a PhD at Wolfson College, Oxford, studying the measurement of blood flow in the heart. He also spent a year in post-graduate study in California.

== Career ==
Tunstall Pedoe was appointed as a cardiologist and general physician at Hackney Hospital in 1973. Under his guidance, the cardiology unit developed into a busy and successful department, where he developed the ideas in his PhD thesis into pioneering, non-invasive diagnostic techniques, using ultrasound to measure blood velocity. He led the commissioning team for Homerton University Hospital, ensuring that it had links to its local community. He was committed to the National Health Service, using his hospital when he needed to and working almost wholly within the NHS.

In addition to his clinical duties, Tunstall Pedoe chaired the hospital's art committee, which brought modern works to display on its walls.

== London Marathon ==
As a keen club runner, who had represented his university, and a cardiologist, he was recruited to set up medical support for the first London Marathon in 1981, and stayed as unpaid Chief Medical Officer for 27 years. He gave strong support to the concept that the race should be open to public entry, not just to professional or amateur specialist runners and countered opposition based upon concern regarding the risks. As a result, principles were established to keep safe all participants, irrespective of their sporting background; these have been adopted internationally. In addition, Tunstall Pedoe gained funding to establish the London Sports Medicine Institute at St Bartholomews Hospital. He concluded his London Marathon tenure with a pair of medical journal articles summarizing key aspects of the experience.

As well as an amateur runner, Tunstall Pedoe was also a keen astronomer, chess player and amateur photographer, specialising in macro pictures of wildlife. His photographic work was displayed in health centres in Hackney.

== Death ==
Tunstall Pedoe died from a heart attack in London on 13 February 2015, having suffered from Parkinson's disease. His wife, Robin, died in 2014; he was survived by his twin brother, Hugh (emeritus professor of cardiovascular epidemiology), his children, Nadine, Simon and Ian, and by three granddaughters.
