= Acorn User =

- First issue cover
- Categories: Computing
- First issue: July 1982
- Final issue Number: December 2003; 267
- Country: United Kingdom
- Based in: London
- Language: English
- ISSN: 0263-7456
- OCLC: 173341644

Acorn User magazine was founded by Acorn Computers in 1982, contract-published by Addison-Wesley, to coincide with the launch of the BBC Micro. It covered the range of Acorn home computers, the BBC Micro and Atom at first and later the Electron, Archimedes and Risc PC.

== History ==
The first issue was dated July/August 1982. From the April 1984 issue, the magazine came under the control of Redwood Publishing, a company recently founded by Michael Potter (a former publisher at Haymarket Publishing), Christopher Ward (a former editor of the Daily Express and a non-executive director of Acorn) and Chris Curry (one of the founders of Acorn). In 1989, the name changed to BBC Acorn User, reflecting the fact that the commercial arm of the BBC, BBC Enterprises, took control of Redwood to expand its publishing activities. The magazine lost the BBC branding when it was sold to Europress, publisher of rival title Acorn Computing, coinciding with its January 1994 issue.

The magazine later incorporated Acorn Computing and Archimedes World magazines. Even when compatible hardware was released by RiscStation, Castle, MicroDigital, and Advantage 6 the magazine continued with the Acorn name whilst covering the extended range of hardware.

In 2004 the magazine was acquired by Finnybank Ltd, which had previously purchased the RISC OS Acorn Publisher magazine: the two magazines were replaced by Qercus, edited by John Cartmell.

== See also ==
- The Micro User / Acorn Computing
- Archive
- BEEBUG / Risc User
- Electron User
