= The Micro User =

UK computer magazine

- The Micro User issue 1, cover dated March 1983. A reference sticker of the BBC Micro's display modes was mounted on the cover.
- Managing editor: Derek Meakin
- Categories: Home computing, information technology, electronics
- Frequency: Monthly
- Circulation: 68,328; ABC, January–June 1984
- First issue: March 1983
- Final issue Number: September 1992; Vol 10 No 7
- Company: Database Publications
- Country: United Kingdom
- Based in: Stockport, Greater Manchester SK7
- Language: English
- ISSN: 0265-4040
- OCLC: 215302691

The Micro User (titled BBC Micro User in the first three issues) was a British specialist magazine catering to users of the BBC Microcomputer series, Acorn Electron, Acorn Archimedes and, to a limited extent, the Cambridge Z88. It had a comprehensive mix of reviews of games, application software, and the latest Acorn computers; type-in programs (duplicated on a "cover disk" which was available separately), a correspondence page offering help with computer problems, and approachable technical articles on programming and the BBC Micro's internals.

The magazine hosted the long-running Body Building series by Mike Cook, in which each article introduced a small electronics project that could be built and connected to one of the BBC Micro's I/O ports. The project could be ordered in kit form or fully assembled, or the reader could source the parts and design as the articles contained a circuit diagram.

There were regular columns on adventure gaming from two successive contributors under the pseudonyms "Alice through the VDU" and "The Mad Hatter". They reviewed the latest adventure releases for Acorn computers, offered hints to some games and scattered mathematical and logical puzzles in their articles. Another regular columnist, using the pen-name of "Hac-Man" (in reference to Pac-Man) set out cheats and compatibility fixes for popular arcade-style games, in the form of pokes or short type-in programs.

Watford Electronics and Technomatic were prominent advertisers, taking out multi-page spreads in every issue in the mid 1980s. From October 1983 the magazine carried the first four issues of Electron User as a pull-out; this then split off into an independent publication.

== Acorn Computing ==
With the October 1992 issue, the magazine was renamed Acorn Computing. Each issue now came with a cover disc for use on RISC OS computers.

== See also ==
- Acorn User
- Archive (magazine)
- BEEBUG (later Risc User)
- Electron User
