= Pipeline (video game) =

1988 video game

- Publisher: Superior Software
- Designers: Ian Holmes; William Reeve
- Platforms: BBC Micro, Acorn Electron, Windows
- Release: 1988: BBC, Electron; 2004: Windows (remake)
- Genre: Action-adventure
- Mode: Single-player

Pipeline is a video game for the BBC Micro and Acorn Electron, originally published by Superior Software in 1988. It is an overhead view action role-playing game set on a mining platform. It was remade for Windows as Pipeline Plus (2004).

== Gameplay ==
The game is a fast, four-way scrolling action-adventure game with a look similar to previous Superior games Repton and Ravenskull, but with a higher frame rate. It is set on a mining platform above Io, the sulfur-rich moon of Jupiter.

Pipeline was bundled with graphics and level design programs, allowing players to design their own game scenarios incorporating keys and doors, patrolling guards, explosions, throwable objects, moving walls, puzzles in the style of Sokoban, pipes, teleports and other simple kinds of puzzle logic.

== Development ==
In game screenshot (BBC Micro)

The game was written by Ian Holmes and William Reeve of Cambridge, England and published by the leading BBC Micro game company of the time, Superior Software of Leeds.

The original game concept, strongly influenced by the earlier game Ravenskull, was of an action RPG. By collecting treasure and completing quests, the player would progress through medieval guilds in a fantasy setting: the working title was GuildMaster.

A change in direction was suggested by Richard Hanson (managing director and co-founder of Superior Software). Instead of a medieval city, the game took place on a contemporary oil platform with a red-headed protagonist nicknamed Red O'Hare collecting oil drums and putting out fires (a reference to Red Adair). This plotline was, however, quickly transplanted to a science-fictional setting, following the Piper Alpha disaster in 1988.

The name Pipeline arose from the gameplay element of fast transport to distant parts of the map through topologically interwoven pipes (novel to the BBC Micro at the time, but Super Mario Bros. or Sonic the Hedgehog were well-known examples for this element).

== Release ==
The game was first released in 1988 by Superior Software/Acornsoft. It was included on the Play It Again Sam 11 compilation in 1989. It was also re-released in 1991 as part of the Superior/Blue Ribbon budget range. Although the inlay made no mention of the game editing programs, they were included on the cassette.

An expanded version for Windows, Pipeline Plus, was published by Superior Interactive in 2004.

== Reception ==
The game was given a maximum score by Electron User with 10/10 for sound, graphics, playability and value for money (as well as overall) calling it "a masterpiece of brain twisting entertainment".

== See also ==
- Jupiter's moons in fiction
