= Cosmic Camouflage =

1988 video game

- Acorn Electron loading screen
- Developer(s): Dan Gallagher
- Publisher(s): Superior Software; Acornsoft
- Platform(s): Acorn Electron, BBC Micro
- Release: EU: 1988
- Genre(s): Multidirectional shooter
- Mode(s): Single-player

Cosmic Camouflage is a multidirectional shooter for the BBC Micro and Acorn Electron. It was released in 1988 as the sequel to Acornsoft's Meteors. Both games are clones of the 1979 Atari, Inc. arcade video game Asteroids.

The game was only available on the compilation Play It Again Sam 4, along with Frak!, Spellbinder, and either Grand Prix Construction Set (BBC) or Guardian (Electron).

== Gameplay ==
The BBC Micro version uses four colours compared to the Electron's two.

The player controls a spaceship in order to avoid and destroy asteroids. The controls are rotate, thrust and fire. It expands on Meteors by introducing different types of asteroids and enemies, and a limited use camouflage function that allows the player to pass through asteroids and enemies.

== Reception ==
Electron User called it a "radically improved" game compared to its predecessor, concluding "Cosmic Camouflage is a novel implementation of a classic, and if you enjoyed Meteors you'll love this upgrade". Although individual games weren't given a score, the compilation overall was given a score of 9/10 and awarded "Golden Game" status.
