= Deathstar (video game) =

1985 video game

- Developer: Peter Johnson
- Publishers: Superior Software; Blue Ribbon
- Platforms: Acorn Electron; BBC Micro
- Release: 1985
- Genre: Multidirectional shooter
- Mode: Single-player

Deathstar (also written as DeathStar) is multidirectional shooter for the Acorn Electron and BBC Micro developed by Peter Johnson and originally published in the UK by Superior Software in 1985. It is a clone of the arcade game Sinistar.

== Gameplay ==
BBC Micro screenshot

The player uses four keys, two to rotate the ship (which is always moving forwards), one to shoot and one to launch a starbomb. Firing can destroy enemy workers and warriors, but only a starbomb can be used against the eponymous Deathstar itself. Collisions with workers, warriors or asteroids (referred to in the instructions as planetoids) do not cause damage to the player.

The workers job is to build the Deathstar by transporting crystals to it, while the warriors job is to mine the crystals and also defend the Deathstar by attacking the player. The initial objective is to keep firing at the asteroids until crystals break free, which are then picked up in order to score points, but are more importantly converted into starbombs. The starbombs are ultimately used against the Deathstar once the workers have finished constructing it. The player must successfully defeat the Deathstar to progress into the Worker Zone which has few planetoids, with a bonus screen between each zone.

The game employs 16-way scrolling over a multi-coloured starfield and runs at a fast rate on both the BBC Micro and Acorn Electron hardware.

Despite the inferior hardware of the Acorn Electron, the in-game sound can be improved up to BBC Micro standards with the addition of Project Expansions' Sound Cartridge.

== Development ==
Title screen of the unreleased Atarisoft version, before the game was renamed to Deathstar (BBC Micro).

The game was to initially be published by Atarisoft as an official port of the arcade version under its original name, Sinistar, but the Atarisoft brand was dropped in 1984 and Atari decided to pull out of the Acorn computer market altogether while a number of games were still under development.

The game was instead renamed Deathstar and a new title screen was designed, allowing it to be released as an unofficial clone by Superior Software in 1985. The game was released shortly after another popular game known as Repton, and is regarded as being part of a successful run of titles from Superior Software in a short space of time.

The then-renamed Deathstar was first published solely by Superior Software in 1985 and later re-released in 1989 by Superior Software and Blue Ribbon as a budget title. The game also appeared on the Beau Jolly compilations Five Star Games and 10 Computer Hits 4, and Superior Software's own Superior Collection compilations (vol. 2 on the BBC, vol. 3 on the Electron). A cheat loader program for the game was also published in 1988 by Impact Software on the compilation Cheat it again Joe 1. An in-built cheat was discovered to have been left in the BBC version of the game and was published in the March 1989 edition of Micro User magazine.

Deathstar was prominently advertised with full-page dedicated ads in various Acorn-related publications of the 1980s and was also reviewed in magazines such as Acorn User and Electron User. Deathstar was again reviewed in the 2009 book The 8-Bit Book - 1981 to 199x by Jerry Ellis, published by Hiive books.

=== Speech chip support ===
The Sinistar arcade game uses sampled speech, which is beyond the abilities of standard BBC Micro and Electron hardware. The BBC Micro has a speech synthesiser chip available as an official add-on, but it has a limited vocabulary. Users who played with this hardware would hear the speech chip say "R, R, R, I an complete" (using the letter "R" repeated for the laugh, and "an" instead of "am"), though this is not a line from the arcade original. Programmer Peter Johnson said at the time: "I knew very few gamers would have that speech chip fitted, but I would have loved to see the expression of surprise on their faces the first time they heard the DeathStar speak".

== Reception ==
Roland Waddliove, writing in Electron User magazine stated that "DEATHSTAR is a super fast, all-action arcade classic", "it's the sort of game that you can't put down" and "you've got to have just one more go". Martin Reed also in Electron User described the game as "an excellent conversion" and "a great blast".
