= Overdrive (1984 video game) =

1984 video game

- Developer: Superior Software
- Publisher: Superior Software
- Designer: Peter Johnson
- Platforms: Acorn Electron, BBC Micro
- Release: EU: 1984
- Genre: Racing
- Mode: Single-player

Overdrive is a racing game written by Peter Johnson for the Acorn Electron and BBC Micro and published in 1984 by Superior Software.

== Gameplay ==
The objective of the game is to finish in the top 12 in order to qualify for the next track. There are five different tracks, but because there are no bends, the only difference is the change in scenery (fields, night, snow, desert and riverside scenes) as well as a change in the grip.

The first 'fields' track (Electron)

Points are awarded for the distance travelled as well as a bonus given at the end of each level depending on the number of computer-controlled cars that have been passed. If the player collides with another car, they will explode and respawn. This can happen an infinite number of times, but will give opponents the opportunity to pass while the player slowly accelerates. It is also common for opponents to crash into the back of the player while they are still accelerating, causing another explosion.

== Reception ==
Reception

Review score
Publication	Score
Bristol Post	4/5

The game was hugely successful, selling almost 40,000 copies across both BBC Micro and Electron versions which was exceptional for that platform. It was Superior Software's biggest seller, out-selling even the individual Repton titles. It was especially popular on the Acorn Electron (outselling the BBC version by a ratio of more than 2:1).

== Legacy ==
Overdrive remained the only 3D racing game available for the Electron until 1987 when Superior released the motorbike racer Crazee Rider, a game originally conceived as a follow-up to Overdrive. This game included bends, demonstrating that it would have been possible, but the fact it took so long for another such game to be released shows what a technical achievement converting Overdrive for the Electron had been. Overdrive was also included on the Superior Collection compilations (vol. 2 on the BBC, vol. 3 on the Electron) released in March of the same year.
