= Grand Prix Construction Set =

1987 video game

- Publishers: Superior Software; Acornsoft
- Designer: A. Bradley
- Platform: BBC Micro
- Release: 1987
- Genre: Racing
- Modes: Single-player, multiplayer

Grand Prix Construction Set is a racing video game for the BBC Micro released in 1987 by Superior Software. It is a simulation of Formula One coupled with a track editor. It can be played in full screen single-player or two-player split screen modes.

Unlike the majority of Superior's BBC Micro games at the time, it was not possible to convert the game to the Acorn Electron but a game that started out as an Electron equivalent became the BBC/Electron motorbike racing game Crazee Rider.

== Legacy ==
It was also available on the 1988 Superior Software compilation Play It Again Sam 4, along with Frak!, Cosmic Camouflage, and Spellbinder.

== See also ==
- Racing Destruction Set
- Rally Speedway
