= Qwak =

1989 video game

- Publishers: Superior Software (BBC, Electron); Team17 (Amiga)
- Designer: Jamie Woodhouse
- Platforms: BBC Micro, Acorn Electron, Amiga, Amiga CD32, Game Boy Advance, iOS, Mac OS, Windows, Symbian
- Release: 1989: BBC/Electron; 1993: Amiga; 2006: GBA
- Genre: Puzzle-platform
- Modes: Single-player, multiplayer

Qwak is a 2D puzzle-platform game developed by Jamie Woodhouse. It was initially released for the BBC Micro and Acorn Electron in 1989 as part of Superior/Acornsoft's Play It Again Sam 10 compilation. An updated and enhanced Amiga version was given a budget release by Team17 in 1993. This update added several new features, including a two player mode and additional levels. The game was re-released on the Amiga CD32 later that year in a double-pack with science fiction shooter Alien Breed.

In 2006, Woodhouse completed development of a Game Boy Advance version of Qwak. Microsoft Windows, Macintosh, and iOS versions are also available.

== Gameplay ==
The object of the game is to guide a green duck through eighty levels. Fruit and gems can be collected for points, and enemies are eliminated with projectile egg weapons. Progress through the game is earned by collecting gold and silver keys. There are a variety of power-ups also available, including 'chocolate egg' weapons and extra shots.

In addition to the normal-style levels, the challenge levels require the player to complete levels and collect all fruit within twenty seconds.

Upon completion of all eighty levels, the levels are looped.

== Reception ==
The Amiga version was awarded 92% and a 'Gamer Gold' review by Amiga Computing magazine.
