= Stryker's Run =

1986 video game

- BBC Micro cover art
- Developer(s): Chris Roberts; Philip Meller; Nick Elms; Martin Edmondson and Nicholas Chamberlain
- Publisher(s): Superior Software/Acornsoft
- Designer(s): Chris Roberts; Philip Meller
- Platform(s): Acorn Electron, BBC Micro
- Release: BBC Micro: EU: 1986; Acorn Electron: EU: 1987
- Genre(s): Action
- Mode(s): Single-player

Stryker's Run is a video game designed by Chris Roberts and Philip Meller for the BBC Micro and BBC Master which was published by Superior Software in 1986. It was also later converted to the Acorn Electron. It is a 2D side-scrolling action game. It was well received, particularly for its graphics.

== Gameplay ==
Acorn Electron screenshot. The start of the game at the enemy HQ.

Stryker's Run is a 2D side-scrolling action game. The game is set during a futuristic war. The player takes the role of Commander John Stryker of the Allied Nations who has obtained plans of an attack by the enemy Volgans.

The objective of the game is to escape with the plans and reach the Allied headquarters. Stryker is armed with a laser pistol and grenades. He can also commandeer aircraft that can be used until the fuel runs out. The Volgans have a wide variety of weapons including rifles, pistols, grenades, machine guns, mortars, mines, helicopter gunships, rocket launchers and SAM missiles.

As well as enemies, the game features allied soldiers who will fire at the enemies but can get caught in crossfire. The game takes place entirely on one level on a scrolling landscape.

== Development and release ==
The game was originally developed and coded by Chris Roberts and Philip Meller on the BBC Micro with additional graphics by Nick Elms. As the game pushed the limits of the hardware, certain elements had to be left out of the standard version and Stryker's Run became the first game released to include an enhanced version for the newly released BBC Master. As well as extra in-game graphics, this version adds a title screen with music, a high score table, on-screen instructions and user-defined controls. The music, a version of the Yellow Magic Orchestra's "Rydeen", was created by Martin Galway. The standard version could only fit in a plain screen with minimal text. The BBC Micro version of the game (also containing the Master enhanced version) was released by Superior Software in 1986 on cassette and floppy disk.

Unlike the majority of Superior Software's BBC Micro games, it was thought that it would not be possible to convert to the Acorn Electron as the game already used up the memory of the BBC Micro and the Electron lacks hardware scrolling capability. After completing the sequel to the game, Martin Edmondson and Nicholas Chamberlain did create an Electron version. The main difference is that instead of one long, scrolling screen, the playing area is broken up into single screen sections. The front end of the game is even more limited than the standard BBC Micro version as the game starts as soon as the game is loaded and there is only a plain screen displaying the score when the player dies. The Electron version was released in 1987 (on cassette only) at the same time as the sequel.

The game was included on the first Play It Again Sam compilation released for Christmas 1987. This included the Electron version on disk for the first time.

== Legacy ==
The game spawned a sequel, titled Codename: Droid - Stryker's Run part 2, which was released in 1987. This took place in a multi-level underground base with many added moves and features, and was considered by a GamesTM reviewer as an early example of what later became known as the Metroidvania genre. A third game was in development for the RiscPC in the mid 1990s but was never completed. A remake of the original game for Microsoft Windows by the original publishers has been in development since 2007 but has no set release date.

== Critical reception ==
BBC Micro magazine A&B Computing said: "This game will impress you... the graphics are stunning... this should be in every collection". Electron User, in a dual review for Stryker's Run and its sequel, gave a score of 10/10 but while they praised the "beautifully drawn" backdrops, it was noted that the "animation is a bit flickery at times". In their review of the Play It Again Sam compilation, they also stated that "the scenery is breathtaking and what it lacks in playability is made up for by sheer fun".
