= Hyperball =

1990 breakout clone video game

- Cover art for the "Play It Again Sam 13" compilation edition
- Publisher: Superior/Acornsoft
- Designers: Steve Parkinson; Rowland Wright
- Programmer: Steve Parkinson
- Platforms: Acorn Electron, BBC Micro
- Release: 1990
- Genre: Breakout clone
- Mode: Single-player

Hyperball is a clone of the 1986 arcade game Arkanoid created for the Acorn Electron and BBC Micro. It was released as part of the compilation Play It Again Sam 13 in 1990.

== Gameplay ==
Hyperball follows the Breakout gameplay of a controllable bat used to keep a bouncing ball on screen and destroying blocks. When blocks are hit, an assortment of capsules occasionally drop. These include an infrared view which allowed the player to see otherwise "invisible" blocks, a laser cannon, a ball detonator which splits the ball into eight separate balls and a diamond cutter which allows the ball to travel through anything. An alien also sometimes falls, with detrimental effects including biting a hole in the bat, magnetizing the bat (making control difficult) or speeding up the ball.

There are six sets of twenty screens. Each set is loaded in individually due to memory constraints. These can be tackled in any order. Following each screen is a bonus screen to earn extra points before the "system upgrade" level where it is possible to use points accumulated to "buy" weapons to help with the next level.

== Development and release ==
The game was developed by Steve Parkinson from his home in Colchester, UK and took nearly two years to complete. Development was completed in 1989 and submitted to Superior Software. As Superior only issued full price games, they occasionally released games directly onto their compilations. Hyperball was released on Play It Again Sam 13 in 1990 along with three previously released games: Barbarian II, Percy Penguin and Pandemonium (although the Electron version of Pandemonium was also exclusive to this compilation).

== Reception ==
Electron User gave the "Golden Game" title to the Play It Again Sam 13 compilation containing Hyperball with an overall score for the collection of 9/10. Hyperball was given only praise in the review (although its high level of difficulty was noted) with reviewer Jon Revis concluding "Hyperball is one of the biggest and best versions of Breakout on the Electron, and a most worthy inclusion on this compilation".
