= Perplexity (disambiguation) =

Perplexity is a measurement of how well a probability distribution or probability model predicts a sample.

Perplexity may also refer to:

- Perplexity (video game), a 1990 video game
- Perplex City, an alternate reality game (ARG)
- Perplexity AI, a US software company providing a search engine

== See also ==
- The Perplexities, a 1767 comedy play by Thomas Hull
