= A Question of Sport (video game) =

1988 video game

- Acorn Electron cover
- Developer: Elite Systems
- Publishers: Elite Systems; Superior Software
- Designer: Richard Underhill
- Platforms: Acorn Electron, Amiga, Amstrad CPC, Atari ST, BBC Micro, Commodore 64, ZX Spectrum
- Release: 1988
- Genres: Sports, trivia
- Modes: Single-player, multiplayer

A Question of Sport is a 1988 video game based on the BBC quiz show of the same name. As in the show, the player has to answer questions about sports. The game uses the same engine as Mike Read's Computer Pop Quiz.
