= Crazee Rider =

1987 video game

- Acorn Electron 3.5" disk inlay
- Developer(s): Kevin Edwards
- Publisher(s): Superior Software; Acornsoft
- Platform(s): Acorn Electron, BBC Micro
- Release: EU: 1987
- Genre(s): Racing
- Mode(s): Single-player

Crazee Rider is a motorbike racing video game created by Kevin Edwards and published by Superior Software in 1987. It was released for the Acorn Electron and BBC Micro with an enhanced version for the BBC Master. The game was particularly well received for the Electron as it was the first 3D racing game with corners for that machine.

== Gameplay ==
Acorn Electron screenshot showing a corner on the Le Mans circuit.

The player competes as one of sixty riders in a series of motorbike races held on the real life race circuits Le Mans, Anderstorp, Paul Ricard, Brands Hatch, Misano, Silverstone and the Nürburgring. The player must finish in the top six in order to qualify for the next race.

As the race begins, the player's bike is slow to accelerate so the rest of the field speed past. The player must attempt to catch and pass the other racers. The player may also gain bonus points by knocking the other racers off their bikes by side swiping them when the player is slightly in front. If the computer controlled racer is slightly in front when the bikes clash, it will cause the player to slow down. If the player hits the back of another bike, their bike is disabled for a short time.

== Development ==
The game was originally conceived as an Acorn Electron car racing game as a follow-up to the hugely successful Overdrive. That game was the only 3D racing game available for the Electron so despite only having straight tracks, became Superior Software's biggest selling game. In late 1986, Superior reissued Acornsoft's BBC Micro only racing simulation Revs and were also working on the Grand Prix Construction Set, set for release in 1987. Neither of these games were able to be converted for the Electron. After completing the shoot 'em up Galaforce, Superior asked Kevin Edwards if he would be interested in writing an Electron racing game. During development, it was decided to change the game to a motorbike racer and to also release it on the BBC Micro.

The Electron version runs in a four colour mode with the player able to change the three main colours (the fourth always remaining black). The standard BBC Micro version is virtually identical but runs in an eight colour mode. An enhanced version was included for the BBC Master which included more circuits, extra in-game graphics (including extra animation and different coloured opponents) and music by Martin Galway.

== Release ==
Crazee Rider was published in 1987 on cassette and 5.25" DFS floppy disk as well as ADFS 3.5" disk for the Acorn Electron Plus 3 and Master Compact. The original release included a competition prize of a £500 moped.

The game was included on the Play It Again Sam 2 compilation in 1988 and also re-released in 1989 as part of the Superior/Blue Ribbon budget range.

== Reception ==
Electron User called the game "superb", giving an overall score of 9/10 (with 10/10 for both playability and value for money) with reviewer Joanne Hutcheson concluding "Crazee Rider is an exciting game - it's fast, challenging and there's plenty to keep you entertained". A&B Computing, who concentrated on the BBC Micro, were less impressed, awarding only 7/10. Reviewer Dave Reeder claimed: "There is nothing here that marks bold new steps into unknown programming areas - the game is solidly put together but is not up to the usual high standard of Superior releases for the Beeb". He did however concede that "The Electron version is what counts and here, I'm told, it does things at great speed to amaze Electron owners".
