= Ricochet (1989 video game) =

- Developer(s): Neil Davidson; David Williams
- Publisher(s): Superior Software; Superior Interactive
- Platform(s): Acorn Electron, BBC Micro, Windows
- Release: 1989: BBC/Electron; 2005: Windows
- Genre(s): Action-adventure
- Mode(s): Single-player

Ricochet is an action-adventure game for the BBC Micro and Acorn Electron home computers, published by Superior Software in 1989. It was written by Neil Davidson and David Williams with some graphics work and level design by Nik Weston and Guy Burt.

The object of the game is to retrieve five hourglasses from diverse scenarios to restore the flow of time. It features elements of both platform and puzzle games. The puzzles are mostly logical (keys unlock doors, gold placates a burglar), though there are exceptions.

== Gameplay ==
BBC Micro screenshot. SPRAT is shown bottom left.

While the game shares many elements made popular in earlier Superior arcade adventures such as Citadel, it has a unique feel due to the movement of the main character. The player controls a creature named "SPRAT" (Small Partially Robotic Alien Time-traveller), depicted as a red sphere wearing sunglasses. SPRAT moves by rolling but can only do so along level ground or down slopes. There are ladders to climb but many platforms require a special movement to be reached. By holding 'down' (SPRAT squashes himself) to build up potential energy, then releasing, SPRAT can bounce at either a 45- or 90-degree angle.

== Legacy ==
Ricochet is one of a range of 1980s Superior games that was re-released for Microsoft Windows by Superior Interactive, with new graphics and added levels.
