= Tactic (video game) =

1990 video game

- Publishers: Eterna, Superior Software, Nessprod
- Platforms: Acorn Archimedes, BBC Micro, iPhone/iPod Touch
- Release: 1990
- Genre: Puzzle
- Modes: Single-player, multiplayer

Tactic is a video game, originally released for the Acorn Archimedes in 1990 by Eterna. It takes the form of a falling block puzzle.

== Gameplay ==
Tactic is a falling block puzzle as popularised by the game Tetris. Unlike that game, all of the blocks are the same size but are a number of different colours (and on systems that cannot display enough colours, different shapes). The aim of the game is to drop the blocks so that blocks of the same colour form set patterns (e.g. a line in a set direction or a cross). The patterns required to complete the level are shown at the bottom of the screen. If a required pattern is formed, those blocks disappear causing any blocks resting above to fall. The iOS version adds bombs.

== Release ==
The game was first released in 1990 for the Acorn Archimedes by Eterna. It was then converted to BBC Micro and Acorn Electron by Superior Software. The BBC Micro version was released on the 1993 compilation Play It Again Sam 17 but as that was the first of the series not to be released on the Acorn Electron, the Electron version was never released. The game was then released by Nessprod for iPhone and iPod Touch in 2009.
