= Perplexity (video game) =

1990 video game

- Developer: Ian Collinson
- Publishers: Superior Software; Acornsoft
- Platforms: Acorn Electron, BBC Micro
- Release: 1990
- Genre: Puzzle
- Mode: Single-player

Perplexity is a video game created by Ian Collinson for the Acorn Electron and BBC Micro and published by Superior Software in 1990. It is a pseudo 3D maze game with Sokoban-style puzzles.

== Gameplay ==
Acorn Electron screenshot. The top of the screen is using the display to store game data to fit the game into the Electron's limited memory.

Perplexity is an isometric pseudo 3D maze game which graphically resembles the 1987 arcade game Pac-Mania (both the maze view and main characters) but while it does share some gameplay elements, the game is a much more calm and organised playing experience with the emphasis on puzzle-solving and as such has been described as a 3D version of Repton.

There are sixteen mazes containing diamonds which must be collected and monsters to be avoided. The mazes are broken up with doors that must be opened by pushing keys into them. The keys must be facing in the correct direction. There are other items that can be pushed including boulders that create diamonds when pushed together and black boulders that are just obstructions. There are also bonus items. As the items can only be pushed, and not pulled, the main puzzle element of the game is a Sokoban-style transport puzzle as pushing certain items against a wall or in front of other objects means the level is impossible to complete.

== Release ==
The game was developed by Ian Collinson in 1989 and released for the Acorn Electron and BBC Micro in 1990 by Superior Software. In 1991, it was included on the Play It Again Sam 16 compilation.

== Reception ==
Electron User gave the game a score of 9/10 and "Golden Game" status, concluding "Perplexity is a superb game and will keep you glued to your keyboard for hours... It's good to see Superior still supporting the Electron market, especially with games of this quality". BBC Acorn User said the game is a "classic for your collection, but you may end up smashing your Beeb in frustration".
