= Head First =

Head First or Headfirst may refer to:

== Music ==
- Head First (The Babys album) (1979)
- Head First (Badfinger album) (recorded 1974, released 2000)
- Head First (Goldfrapp album) (2010), or its title track
- Head First (Uriah Heep album) (1983)
- "Head First", a song by Aerosmith from the Get a Grip sessions

== Other media ==
- Head First (book series), a series of books on computer programming by Kathy Sierra and Bert Bates
- HeadFirst PD, a library of public-domain software
- Headfirst Productions, a defunct UK video game studio
- Head First (TV series), Australian 2010s TV documentary series
- "Head First", an episode of the sitcom The King of Queens
- Headfirst (La Tête la première), a 2012 Belgian film starring Alice de Lencquesaing

== Linguistics ==
- Head-first, a property whereby a word comes before the words that modify it
