= Predator (video game) =

1987 video game

- Developers: Software Studios; System 3 Pack-In-Video (NES); Klon (MSX); Source; GlenHills Graphics
- Publishers: Activision; Superior Software; The Hit Squad; Pack-In-Video
- Platforms: Acorn Electron, Amiga, Amstrad CPC, Atari ST, BBC Micro, Commodore 64, NES, MSX, ZX Spectrum
- Release: 1987, 1988
- Genre: Action game
- Mode: Single-player

Predator is a 1987 side-scrolling action game based on the 1987 film Predator, and the first game based on the franchise.

== Gameplay ==
The player starts with no weapons and must collect them as the game progresses.

=== MSX ===
The MSX version was developed by Klon and is an action-platformer. The player takes the role of Dutch Schaefer. He can use his fists, a submachine gun, or mines as weapons, with each weapon containing a limited supply of ammunition Every time the player exits a level, a map screen appears, in which they may enter levels adjacent to their current level.

=== NES ===
The NES version was developed by Pack-In-Video, and is based loosely on the MSX version, even borrowing most of its graphics and music. The player takes on the role of "Dutch" Schaefer and must make it from the beginning to the end of the level. The player starts out with his fists, but can also collect a machine gun, laser gun (the only weapon that can do damage to the Predator), and fragmentation grenades. Unlike the MSX version, the player has infinite ammo for each weapon he carries, but unlike the MSX version, can only carry one weapon at a time. Also unlike the MSX version, the player loses any weapons they carry from the previous level into the next. The laser and grenades can be used to break certain walls and ground. Some levels have two exits, one of which will warp the player ahead several levels. At the end of every few levels, a Predator will appear, which the player must neutralize before proceeding to the next level.

Exclusive to the NES version is the "Big Mode", named after the larger sprites than in the normal action stages. Here, the game takes place in an auto-scrolling environment where the screen scrolls to the right. Dutch must shoot blue and red bubbles to collect weapon powerups, whilst avoiding touching them and getting damaged. At the end of each level, he must fight the Predator in a boss battle to proceed to the next level. These levels also act as checkpoints, as after the player loses all their lives, they may continue from the last Big Mode.

The Japanese version has some gameplay differences from the USA/AUS release. The levels have been either completely redesigned or are in a different order. For example, the Japanese version starts on a Big Mode level, whereas the USA version starts on a normal action stage.

== Reception ==
Predator received mixed but largely positive reviews across all the platforms, including the accolades of CU Screen Star from Commodore User for the Commodore 64 version and C+VG Hit! from Computer + Video Games for the ZX Spectrum version. Rachael Smith of Your Sinclair scored the ZX Spectrum version at 7/10, opining it has "great graphics, but too tough to get to grips with when sudden death sneaks up at every opportunity". In Germany, Predator was put on the "Index" by the Bundesprüfstelle für jugendgefährdende Medien (BPjM), which made it illegal to sell or make the game available to minors in Germany, and to advertise the game in any form.
