= Galaforce =

1986 video game

- Publisher(s): Superior Software; Acornsoft
- Designer(s): Kevin Edwards
- Platform(s): Acorn Electron, BBC Micro
- Release: 1986
- Genre(s): Fixed shooter
- Mode(s): Single-player

Galaforce is a fixed shooter video game for the BBC Micro and Acorn Electron, written by Kevin Edwards and published by Superior Software in 1986. It spawned a sequel, Galaforce 2 (1988), and later, Galaforce Worlds (2003).

== Gameplay ==
BBC Micro screenshot showing a multiplier formation. The green Patera aliens at the top of the screen are spawning the blue Quazars and the green Ejnar. The player is controlling the yellow spaceship.

The game is set in the 25th century, in the fictional Magellanic galaxy. The player takes the role of a pilot of the Galaforce, an elite unit of the United Cosmological Federation, on a mission to conquer and overthrow hordes of "savage" aliens.

Galaforce is inspired by arcade fixed shooter games, particularly the Galaga series, but is not a specific clone. The player controls a spaceship that can move horizontally and vertically in the bottom part of the screen (as in Galaga 3). The ship comes under attack from successive formations of aliens. The object of the game is to survive while scoring as highly as possible. Unlike many similar games, not all aliens need to be destroyed. Most of the formations involve aliens entering from one side of the screen, moving quickly across the screen in a set pattern, then leaving the screen or disintegrating at the edge. This most resembles a "Challenging Stage" in Galaga as unlike the standard Galaga stages, the aliens do not settle into a Galaxian style swarm.

There are thirteen different aliens, requiring between one and ten hits to be destroyed, and a large number of different formations. The game is broken up into zones that include a series of formations. The aliens in Zone 1 do not fire at the player and never fly into the bottom area of the screen so as long as the player does not move upwards, it is not possible to be killed. The zones get progressively more difficult, with aliens entering or leaving the screen at the bottom (from Zone 2), firing at the player (from Zone 4) and firing homing bombs (from Zone 14). Some formations are known as multiplier formations where a small number of one type of alien keep spawning other aliens until the originals are destroyed.

== Development and release ==
The game was created by Kevin Edwards for the BBC Micro and ported to the Acorn Electron. The Electron version runs a little slower and in a four colour mode rather than the eight colour mode used on the BBC. Both versions were released in September 1986 by Superior Software. It was the first title released under the joint Superior Software / Acornsoft name in the new double-cassette sized cases which would become standard for Superior releases.

== Reception ==
Electron User gave the game a score of 9/10 with reviewer Jon Revis concluding "Galaforce is a game to get the adrenaline flowing, the kind of game you continue playing when you close your eyes in bed at night - it should carry a government health warning!".

== Legacy ==
Galaforce was included on the Play It Again Sam 2 compilation in 1988 and re-issued as part of the Superior/Blue Ribbon budget range in 1989.

=== Galaforce 2 ===
Following the motorbike racing game Crazee Rider, Kevin Edwards created a sequel to Galaforce. The game is similar with the main difference being the inclusion of end of level bosses and bonus items. It also supports two players, alternating turns. Galaforce 2 was first released on the Play It Again Sam 6 compilation in 1988. It was later given a stand-alone release in the Superior/Blue Ribbon budget range in 1990.

=== Galaforce Worlds ===
An updated and expanded version of the game was released as Galaforce Worlds for Microsoft Windows in 2003 by Superior Interactive, and iOS and Android versions of Galaforce Worlds were published in 2017. These versions add extra worlds, zones, power-ups and achievements to the earlier game format.
