= Superior Interactive =

- Genre: Video game publisher
- Founded: 1982
- Founder: Richard Hanson, John Dyson
- Headquarters: Leeds, England
- Key people: Steve Botterill, Chris Payne
- Products: Repton, Citadel, Thrust, Zarch, Exile
- Website: www.superiorinteractive.com

Superior Interactive (formerly known as Superior Software Ltd) is a video game publisher. It was one of the main publishers for the BBC Micro and Acorn Electron computers in the 1980s and early 1990s, and occasionally published software to the Commodore 64, Amiga, ZX Spectrum and Amstrad CPC. It currently releases games for Microsoft Windows, iOS and Android, mostly updates of its original games.

== History ==
Per its original name, Superior Software was founded in 1982 by software writers Richard Hanson and John Dyson, university graduates with degrees in Computational Science and Physics of Natural Resources respectively. They had previously programmed software published by Micro Power, and they wrote Superior's first four game releases for the BBC Micro; three were written by Hanson and one by Dyson. Describing the early days, Hanson commented:

We set up Superior Software with just £100 – John and I each put £50 into a company bank account; and we placed a small black-and-white advertisement in one of the early home computer magazines ... £100 was the most money that we would lose from the Superior Software venture if it had not worked out. Anyway we received a very good response to our first advertisement, and the software sales which it generated covered the cost of the advertisement several times over. We started to place larger advertisements in a few magazines, and invited other programmers to send their software to us for evaluation and possible marketing by us.

Key management included Steve Botterill as general manager, and Chris Payne as marketing manager.

By the end of 1983, the business had grown substantially, but John Dyson was unwilling to commit more fully to the operation, being employed as a technician at BBC Television in Leeds. Thus, Richard Hanson brought his older brother, Steve, into the business, which moved out of the homes of its founders and into dedicated premises.

== Releases ==
In 1983, its unauthorised version of Hunchback reached the number one position in the BBC charts. Century Electronics took out an injunction to prevent the game from being sold, later reaching a licensing agreement.

In 1986, Superior acquired the rights to use the Acornsoft brand name and back catalogue as Acorn wanted to focus on hardware. This led to the re-release of some of Acornsoft's most popular titles under the joint Superior Software / Acornsoft label, including David Braben and Ian Bell's Elite and Geoff Crammond's Revs.

Their best-known games are the Repton series of games, which have sold over 125,000 units in total. Other notable Superior Software games for the BBC Micro and Acorn Electron include Overdrive, Citadel, Thrust, Galaforce, Stryker's Run, Ravenskull and Exile. They also published Zarch for the Acorn Archimedes, as well as follow-up games using the same engine, Conqueror and Air Supremacy.

As well as original titles, Superior also released a number of official conversions of popular games from other systems including Barbarian, The Last Ninja, Predator, Hostages and Sim City. They also published a number of educational and utility software titles including the speech synthesis program Speech!.

Play It Again Sam 2 compilation (Acorn Electron cassette)

The "Play It Again Sam" series of compilations included re-releases of their old titles, with four games for the usual price of one. The original Play It Again Sam featured four Superior games (Citadel, Thrust, Ravenskull, and Stryker's Run), while subsequent compilations increasingly featured games licensed from other software houses such as Micro Power or Alligata. These compilations also occasionally included some new games that were thought to be not quite up to the standard of their full price games. The series eventually ran to 18 entries for the BBC Micro.

== Current activity ==
Superior Interactive mainly develops and publishes software for computers and devices running Microsoft Windows, iOS and Android. They have released updated versions of some of their popular 1980s hits for these systems, including the original three Repton games, additional Repton levels, Galaforce Worlds, Ravenskull, Pipeline Plus and Ricochet.

== Software ==
=== Games ===
- Battle Tank
- Invaders
- Centibug
- Alien Dropout
- Hunchback (1983, BBC port)
- Overdrive (1984)
- Stranded
- Mr Wiz
- Percy Penguin
- Smash and Grab
- Tempest (1985, BBC/Electron ports)
- Repton (1985)
- Deathstar (1985)
- Repton 2 (1985)
- Citadel (1985)
- Karate Combat (1986)
- Thrust (1986)
- Galaforce (1986)
- Stryker's Run (1986)
- The Legend of Sinbad (1986)
- Ravenskull (1986)
- Repton 3 (1986)
- Elite (1986, enhanced)
- Revs plus Revs 4 Tracks (1986, enhanced)
- Syncron (1987)
- Kix (1987)
- Grand Prix Construction Set (1987)
- Around the World in 40 Screens (1987)
- Codename: Droid (1987)
- Crazee Rider (1987)
- Palace of Magic (1987)
- Zarch (1987)
- Elixir (1987)
- Bone Cruncher (1987)
- Spellbinder (1987)
- The Life of Repton (1987)
- Zany Kong Junior (1988, re-release)
- Quest (1988)
- Spycat (1988)
- Conqueror (1988)
- Barbarian (1988, BBC/Electron ports)
- Repton Thru Time (1988)
- Pipeline (1988)
- Cosmic Camouflage (1988)
- By Fair Means or Foul (1988)
- Exile (1988)
- Imogen (1988, Electron port)
- Repton Infinity (1988)
- The Last Ninja (1988, BBC/Electron/Archimedes ports)
- Galaforce 2 (1988)
- A Question of Sport (1989, BBC/Electron ports)
- Firetrack (1989, Electron port)
- Repton Mania (1989)
- Barbarian II (1989, BBC/Electron ports)
- Camelot (1989)
- Qwak (1989)
- Predator (1989, BBC/Electron ports)
- Ballistix (1989, BBC/Electron ports)
- Superior Soccer (1989)
- Ricochet (1989)
- Baron (1989)
- Last Ninja 2 (1989, BBC/Electron ports)
- Perplexity (1990)
- Hyperball (1990)
- Pandemonium (1990)
- Hostages (1990)
- Superior Golf (1990)
- Star Port (1990)
- SimCity (1990, BBC/Electron/Archimedes ports)
- Master Break (1990)
- Air Supremacy (1991)
- Cyborg Warriors (1991)
- The Network (1991)
- Vertigo (1991)
- EGO: Repton 4 (1992)
- Technodream (1993)
- Tactic (1993, BBC/Electron ports)
- Citadel 2 (1993)

==== Compilations ====
- The Acornsoft Hits (1987)
- The Superior Collection (1987)
- Play It Again Sam (Electron: 1987-1991, BBC Micro: 1987-1993, Archimedes: 1992-1994)

=== Educational / utility software ===
- Toolkit (1983)
- Assembler (1983)
- World Geography (1983)
- Disassembler (1984)
- Constellation (1984)
- Planetarium (1984)
- UK Geography (1984)
- Speech! (1985)
