= Ravenskull (video game) =

1986 video game

- Front cover art
- Developer(s): Martin Edmondson and Nicholas Chamberlain
- Publisher(s): Superior Software, ProAction, Superior Interactive
- Designer(s): Martin Edmondson & Nicholas Chamberlain (BBC Micro / Acorn Electron); John Wallace (Acorn Archimedes / Risc PC); Darren Izzard (Windows)
- Platform(s): BBC Micro; Acorn Electron; Acorn Archimedes; Risc PC; Microsoft Windows
- Release: 1986 (BBC/Electron); 1994 (Archimedes); 1997 (Risc PC); 2003 (Windows)
- Genre(s): Action-adventure game
- Mode(s): Single-player

Ravenskull is a British graphic adventure video game. It was originally developed by Martin Edmondson and Nicholas Chamberlain for the BBC Micro and Acorn Electron and released by Superior Software (now known as Superior Interactive) in 1986.

== Gameplay ==
The adventurer collects a treasure piece (BBC Micro)

The player may choose from one of four character types: an Adventurer, a Wizard, a Warrior or an Elf. The choice defines both the graphics for the character's player and the treasure pieces to be collected.

== Plot ==
The player is tasked with entering Baron Strieg's Castle Ravenskull in order to defend the village of Austberg and retrieve a stolen silver crucifix, which has been split into quarters and found on four different levels of the castle.

The castle is defended on all four levels by the vicious Ravenbees. Direct contact would cause the player to lose a life. Each Ravenbee moved on a set course moving back and forth along a row, horizontally at a uniform speed matching the normal speed of the player's character. To complete each level and progress to the next level, a player is required to collect all of the treasure pieces before being able to pick up the crucifix quarter section. On completing a level and starting the next, then a jump facility would become available by pressing J to start a game at any level that had been reached. Objects could be picked up, used and dropped - the maximum objects were three that could be carried around in the inventory. Objects could be examined by pressing E, and keys would have an assigned letter for identifying it. Doors and gates were opened using the keys, and barrels could be pushed in any direction in mini puzzles on the map. The objective was to complete all four levels consecutively, without losing a life, and without using the level jump facility. On successfully doing this it produces a congratulatory message to appear on the screen: "Well done Done it!" Superior Software had held a competition with a cash prize offered, and stating a deadline for entering it. The main objects that had featured in the levels is described below:

Level 1 - Castle Ravenskull: Keys (for opening doors and gates). 3 magic scrolls (teleportation, temporary door opening and lightning strike). Axes for removing a wall section. Hazards include acid pools causing loss of a life on contact.

Level 2 - The Catacombs: Keys. A spade for digging out the sections of earth in a poisonous plant maze. A fish that boosts health. A potion which slows down players movement, but increases the health. A Magic scroll for cancelling out the effect of the potion, to restore the speed of player movement. Another magic scroll (teleportation). Hazards include poisonous plants and spiked discs causing loss of a life on contact.

Level 3 - The Bees Hive: Keys. A glass of wine that boosts player health and inverts character movement direction for the keyboard controls i.e. pressing left moves the character right. A compass to restore the keyboard controls back to normal. A magic scroll (time chime) to indicate when a specific door opens and closes for a split second, enabling a player to know how to time it correctly and avoid the Ravenbee in the process. A bow with unlimited arrows, which is used to kill the Ravenbees on being obtained in the inventory. A detonator to activate, causing the removal of four wall sections - one directly above, below, left and right of wherever the dynamite object has been collected and dropped into position.

Level 4 - The Time Shaft: Keys. The bow and arrow. The spade. A cake that boosts health, and permits the pushing of barrels. A bell that rings but may not have any specific use. A magic scroll (teleportation). A scroll and potion that speed up movement.

== Releases ==
Ravenskull loading screen (BBC Micro)

Superior released a 32-bit port for the Acorn Archimedes on their Play It Again Sam 4 compilation in 1994. This version was not compatible with the Risc PC so a new version was released by ProAction in 1997 on their issue of PIAS 4. A fully revamped Microsoft Windows version was released in 2003 by Superior Interactive, the modern publishing label of Superior Software, with new graphics and a significantly larger second set of levels known as "Castle Danube".

The possibility of a mobile port from Masabi was circulated in May 2002, but never appeared.

== Reception ==
On its original release Ravenskull reached number 3 in both the BBC and Electron charts compiled by Gallup. The budget release of the Electron version, published by CDS Microsystems on their Blue Ribbon label, also reached number 3 in early 1989.
