= Joe Blade =

1987 video game

- Developer: Players
- Publisher: Players (Interceptor Micros)
- Designer: Colin Swinbourne
- Platforms: ZX Spectrum, Commodore 64, Amstrad CPC, Acorn Electron, BBC Micro, Atari 8-bit, MSX, Amiga, Atari ST
- Release: 1987
- Genre: Platform
- Mode: Single-player

Joe Blade is a video game published by Interceptor Micros on their Players budget label for the ZX Spectrum, Commodore 64 and Amstrad CPC in 1987. It reached the top of the UK game charts, replacing Renegade. In Germany, the game peaked at number 7. It was ported to the Acorn Electron, BBC Micro, Atari 8-bit computers, MSX, Amiga, and Atari ST. Two sequels to the game were also released, Joe Blade 2 in 1988 and Joe Blade 3 in 1989.

== Gameplay ==
Joe comes across a kidnapped World Leader and a guard (ZX Spectrum)

The first Joe Blade title portrayed Blade as a lone commando sent into an evil mastermind's complex to release a number of diplomats.

== Reception ==
Ron Stewart for Page 6 said "It is not a great game, but for under a tenner what do you expect. There is enough game play here to keep you going for a while."

Arnie Katz & Joyce Worley for Ahoy!'s AmigaUser said "Joe Blade is an exceptionally well programmed product. Its animated illustrations and jaunty soundtrack give it an edge over numerous other 'storm-the-fortress' epics".

Computer and Video Games said "Nice and cheap with ace graphics, Joe Blade certainly cuts it. A good buy."

Crash said "extremely playable and addictive."
