= Ballistix =

1989 video game

- Cover art by Melvyn Grant
- Developer: Reflections Interactive
- Publishers: Amiga, Atari ST: UK: Psyclapse; EU: Sizzlers; MS-DOS, C64: UK: Psyclapse; BBC Micro, Acorn Electron: UK: Superior Software; TurboGrafx-16: NA: NEC Technologies; JP: Coconuts Japan
- Designer: Martin Edmondson
- Platforms: Amiga, Atari ST, Acorn Electron, BBC Micro, Commodore 64, MS-DOS, TurboGrafx-16
- Release: 1989
- Genre: Sports game
- Modes: Single-player, multiplayer

Ballistix is a sports video game created by Martin Edmondson for the Amiga and Atari ST and published by Psyclapse in 1989. It was also converted to a number of other home computers in the same year and the PC Engine/TurboGrafx-16 console in 1991. It is a fictional futuristic sport about directing a puck to a goal by shooting small balls at it.

== Gameplay ==
In game shot (Amiga). The black puck has just missed the goal after being deflected by the silver balls.

The game is a unique futuristic sport which has been compared variously to pinball, the board game Crossfire and shove ha'penny. The player controls a cursor that can fire a stream of small balls. These are used to direct a puck across a court to score a goal. In the two-player game, this is hindered by an opponent, aiming for the opposite goal. In the single-player game, a form of gravity is the opposition.

The game starts with a simple court but it gets progressively more difficult with added obstacles, simple mazes and bonus items. There are 130 courts in total (64 on the C64, 30 on the BBC/Electron). A court is completed when either player scores three goals. If the computer wins in the single-player game, that is game over although the game can be restarted from the same court. Goals can score a range of points depending on how far out they are scored from.

The display is an overhead view showing a small section of the court that scrolls to follow the puck.

== Development and release ==
The game was developed by Martin Edmondson for the Amiga and Atari ST. It was ported to MS-DOS and Commodore 64 with these four versions being published by the Psygnosis sub-label Psyclapse in 1989. It was also converted to the BBC Micro and Acorn Electron by Peter Scott and released for those platforms by Superior Software, also in 1989. In 1991, it was released for the TuboGrafx-16 (published by Psygnosis in the US) / PC Engine (published by Coconuts Japan in Japan). The cover image designed by Melvyn Grant was originally used for the 1981 novel The Steel Tsar and also the 1984 reissue of Judas Priest album Rocka Rolla.

== Reception ==
Computer Gaming World stated that "many of the levels did not seem particularly creative", but nonetheless recommended the game based on the quality of the graphics and sound, and the many game options. Roland Waddilove in Electron User gave the game a score of 9/10, concluding that "Ballistix is original, fun and very addictive". Mark Heley in CU Amiga said the game was "well up to the usual excellent standards of Psygnosis's releases", giving a score of 76%. Zzap!64 praised the "attractive, sharp and very fast moving" graphics and found the two-player game "fun" but were less impressed with the one-player option, awarding an overall score of 72%.
