= HeadFirst PD =

- Company type: Public Domain Library
- Industry: Video games
- Founded: 1992
- Headquarters: Southport, United Kingdom
- Key people: Gareth Boden, James Treadwell

HeadFirst Public Domain was a library of public domain software for the BBC Micro and Acorn Electron 8-bit computers. It also offered several discs of software for the Acorn Archimedes.

== History ==
HeadFirst PD was set up in December 1992 by two friends, Gareth Boden and James Treadwell. Gareth Boden seems to have done the majority of the programming. The friends were just leaving school at the time. It was a bedroom enterprise and HeadFirst PD produced paper catalogues of its products. The catalogues invited people to buy discs full of public domain software from HeadFirst PD for £1.25 per disc.

There are relatively few demos on the Acorn Electron, and HeadFirst PD was unusual in that it released the majority of its software for the Acorn Electron, not the more-popular BBC Micro. Indeed, several of the better HeadFirst PD demos were Electron-only. The Invader Demo and the Vortex Demo were prime examples.

There are several different 'versions' of some HeadFirst PD discs, as the demos were sometimes revisited and slightly improved. The early versions of the discs were superseded. The early HeadFirst PD catalogues, for example, typically had one demo per disc. By the latest catalogue, seven or eight demos – although not all were programmed by the two authors – were typically on a menu-driven disc.

Not all games on HeadFirst PD discs were in fact programmed by HeadFirst PD. Many other public domain groups were going strong at the time, and each library 'borrowed' programs from the other. Some titles on HeadFirst PD discs also appear on BBC PD discs and Mad Rabbit PD discs.

HeadFirst PD was closed down in 1995. The two friends were contributors to the Electron User Group magazine and the launch and demise of the library is documented in full between issues #7 and #23.

The whole library of HeadFirst PD discs was 'lost' in 1995, when the library stopped supplying discs. In 2008, the library was re-discovered by Gareth Boden and was made available on the Acorn Electron World web site.

The best known demos from HeadFirst PD remain the Invaders Demo and the Vortex Demo. Invaders shows a scrolling parallax stars backdrop with a simple space invaders game coupled with scrolling message. Vortex shows a spiral with interrupt-driven music and color switching.

HeadFirst PD also produced several games, along with 'data-packs' to professional titles such as White Magic and Repton Infinity. These extension 'data-packs' are the only surviving fan-based extensions to such Electron games.

HeadFirst PD also produced a spin-off library of images for use with the Stop Press 64 desktop publishing program.
