= Spellbinder (video game) =

1987 video game

- Developers: Etan Shirron; Dan Shirron
- Publishers: Superior Software, Acornsoft
- Platforms: Acorn Electron, BBC Micro
- Release: EU: 1987
- Genre: Adventure
- Mode: Single-player

Spellbinder is an adventure game, released for the BBC Micro and Acorn Electron in 1987.

== Plot ==
The player takes the role of a Magelord, named Eldon the Spellbinder. His task is to find the evil Magelord outcast Zorn, in the castle of Lorraine, and defeat him by use of the so-called Ultimate Spell.

== Gameplay ==
The game is pseudo-3D, allowing the player to move left, right, forwards and backwards in a room, though not up and down. It was presented in a monochrome format, with black and one other colour being used to draw the sprites and backdrops, although the colour varied from room to room, illustrating the environments. A large number of items could be examined for clues, or searched for possible items. The game was relatively open-ended for a game of the time, similar to Exile, allowing the player to move around a large section of the castle right from the start, and start to mix various spells. A few of these spells were listed in the manual, but most had to be discovered from in-game clues.

Unusually, for a BBC Micro game, it has continuous background music: a version of Midnight Summer Dream, the 1983 song from British rock group The Stranglers' album Feline.

== Development ==
The game was written by Dan and Etan Shirron, two teenagers from Israel. They were 14½ and 16 when they started coding the game in 1986. The equipment used to write it was a memory monitor chip, a monochrome 14" TV, a cassette tape recorder and their own BASIC-written graphic-design software. The game was originally named Magelords, later to be named Spellbinder by Superior Software marketing team.
