= Repton (video game) =

- Genre: Puzzle
- Developers: Tim Tyler (Repton 1 & 2); Matthew Atkinson (Repton 3); David Lawrence and David Acton (Repton Infinity); Gary Partis (EGO: Repton 4); Gil Johnson-Smith (ZX Spectrum Repton 1 & 2); David Bratton (PC Repton 1 & 2); John Wallace (Archimedes Repton 3)
- Publisher: Superior Software
- Platforms: BBC Micro, Acorn Electron, Commodore 64, Archimedes, ZX Spectrum, Risc PC, Windows, MS-DOS, iPod Touch iOS, Android

Repton is a video game originally developed by Briton Tim Tyler for the BBC Micro and Acorn Electron and released by Superior Software in 1985. The game spawned a series of follow up games which were released throughout the 1980s. The series sold around 125,000 copies between 1985 and 1990 with Repton 2 selling 35,000 itself. The games have since been remade for several modern systems, including iRepton for the iPhone / iPod Touch in 2010, and Android Repton 1, Android Repton 2 and Android Repton 3 from 2016 to 2018.

The author was inspired by a review of the recently released Boulder Dash, but had never played the game. Compared with Boulder Dash, Repton is a much more calm and organized playing experience with the emphasis on puzzle-solving as opposed to arcade-style improvisation. This remained true as more types of object were added in the sequels.

== Series overview ==
Release timeline
1985	Repton, Repton 2
1986	Repton 3
1987	Around The World in 40 Screens
1987	The Life of Repton
1988	Repton Thru Time
1988	Repton Infinity
1989	Repton Mania
1990
1991
1992	EGO: Repton 4
1993
1994
1995
1996
1997
1998
1999
2000
2001
2002
2003	PC Repton 1
2004	PC Repton 2
2005	PC Repton 3
2006	Repton Spectacular
2007
2008
2009
2010	iRepton
2010	Repton: The Lost Realms
2011
2012
2013
2014	Repton's Mystic Challenge
2015
2016	Android Repton 1
2016	Android Repton 3
2017
2018	Android Repton 2
2018	Repton's Journeys

=== Repton ===
In-game shot of the final level, Screen L (BBC Micro)

Repton, the titular protagonist, is moved around an underground maze in a quest to find all the diamonds (some are held in safes, their release being triggered by finding and collecting a key) within a time limit for each of several levels, while avoiding being trapped or killed by falling rocks and monsters hatched from eggs. The original Repton game was released in the summer of 1985 and has 12 levels, with passwords making it possible to jump directly to later levels. If passwords are employed, on completion of the final level the displayed message challenges the player to complete the game without using them. The new versions of Repton for the PC, iOS and Android introduce additional levels; new Repton levels are also featured in Repton Spectacular, Repton's Mystic Challenge (for Repton 1) and Repton's Journeys (for Repton 2).

=== Repton 2 ===
The sequel to the game, Repton 2, released for Christmas 1985 (release date 14 November 1985) is much bigger. It introduces several new features: spirits (that follow walls and objects to their left and must be guided into cages, turning them into diamonds) and skulls, both of which are fatal to Repton on collision. There are also jigsaw puzzle pieces to collect, which eventually spell out the message "Repton 2 is ended". There are no levels as such in Repton 2: instead transporters move Repton between different screens which, subject to some restrictions, can be completed in any order desired. The entire game is in effect one very large level without passwords, meaning that it must be completed in one attempt. Finally, some screens also contain an exposed 'roof', where meteors (predictably fatal to Repton) fall from the sky.

Repton's requirements in Repton 2 are challenging: Repton must not only collect all diamonds (including those held in safes and behind cages), but also collect all earth, kill all the monsters, collect all puzzle pieces and use all transporters. Once these substantial tasks have been accomplished, Repton must then negotiate the 'roof' of the entire width of the final screen, avoiding meteors falling from the sky in order to reach the starport and thus complete the game. This part is particularly tricky, since the meteors fall in a random fashion, making it difficult for the gamer to guide Repton to safety. This long list of requirements, coupled with the fact that the game must be completed in one attempt, marks Repton 2 as the hardest Repton game to successfully complete. The initial release of Repton 2 could not be completed as one diamond was hidden under a transporter and impossible to collect When Repton 2 was re-written for the PC, it introduced a 'save game' feature making it considerably easier to complete. In addition, brand new scenarios were included, effectively new games.

=== Repton 3 ===
Repton 3, released on 5 November 1986, was developed by Matthew Atkinson at Superior's invitation since Tim Tyler was not interested in programming it, although he did design some of the levels for the new game. While the first two games had only taken a month each to program, Repton 3 took eight months. It reverts to the form of a series of time-limited, password-protected levels. A few new features were introduced: fungus (a substance that gradually spreads wherever it finds space and kills Repton on contact), time capsules (resetting the current level's time limit each time one is collected), crowns and a timebomb which must be defused to complete each level. The inclusion of the timebomb means that, as well as collecting all of the diamonds and crowns, the players have to plan their routes so as to finish up at the timebomb at the end of the level.

Repton 3 includes a map editor along with the game, so that data files can be created with new maps and graphics for the levels. Three themed sets of such files were released as continuations of Repton 3, with the titles Around the World in 40 Screens (1987), The Life of Repton (1987) and Repton Thru Time (1988). These three titles use a slightly modified game engine, in which the algorithm for deciding on the direction spirits first move at the start of a level is improved. They all come with the same game editor as Repton 3.

=== Repton Infinity ===
Repton Infinity was released in 1988, by which time the BBC Micro's popularity as a games platform was beginning to wane. It was developed by Dave Acton and Dave Lawrence (who wrote the user-submitted program section *INFO in Acorn User magazine). It supplements the map editor and graphics editor with a powerful game logic editor which made it possible to alter the way all game objects behaved using a purpose-designed language called Reptol. Four different example games are included to demonstrate its flexibility:

- Repton 3 - Take 2, with a couple of small technical differences in gameplay from Repton 3.
- Repton 4, with imaginative new objects including photocopiers and moving jewels.
- Robbo, "a crazy robot in a strange topsy-turvy world", according to the game inlay.
- Trakker, a chaotic game in which a bulldozer-driving protagonist must destroy various monsters by pushing fruit at them, and all scores are multiples of 17.

There was a long-running problem, infamous amongst owners of the B+, the updated BBC B with 64k, when the newly released Repton Infinity ran on the original BBC B but refused to load on the updated B+. A string of unsuccessful replacements were issued before one that was compatible with both was eventually released.

=== EGO: Repton 4 ===
A game marketed as EGO: Repton 4 was released for the Acorn Archimedes in 1992. It was designed by Richard Hanson and programmed by Gary Partis. This was actually an Archimedes conversion of an earlier Amiga/Atari ST game called Personality Crisis with the character of Repton added in. The game bears little relation to the rest of the Repton series, particularly in that contrary to the spirit of the original it relies on "secret" traps and passages which can only be discovered by walking onto them. The objects and objectives in all the previous Repton games are visible and there are no hidden secrets to be discovered, although in some advanced episodes - notably "OAP" in Life of Repton, "Oceans" in Around the World and "Future" in Repton Thru Time - some objects and enemies are invisible or appear very similar to desirable or innocuous objects.

=== Repton: The Lost Realms ===
In 1988, teenage programmer Paras Sidapara submitted a game he called Repton 4 to Superior Software. As Superior were already working on Repton Infinity, it was not published, and was forgotten until 2008, when a copy was rediscovered. The game was re-programmed by Sarah Walker and rechristened The Lost Realms, to avoid confusion with the Repton 4 game included in Repton Infinity. It was launched in November 2010 by Retro Software, with Superior's permission. The game is similar in style to Repton 3, retaining the structure of separate, password-protected levels and the map and graphics editors. New features include balloons, "absorbency" doors (which can be opened when an "absorbalene" pill is collected, but each pill only allows a certain number of doors to be opened) and ice crystals (which, when collected, freeze any monsters on the level).

== Music ==
The music for Repton is Black and White Rag, by George Botsford, which has been well-known in the UK since at least its 1969 popularisation as the theme tune to the long-running television snooker programme Pot Black. The Scott Joplin piece The Chrysanthemum is the music for Repton 2, and the music for Repton 3 was composed specifically for the game by Paul Hughes and Peter Clarke. Repton Infinity features in-game music, on pressing the 'T' key, although it does not play at the same time as the sound effects during the game, and is turned off by default; it was composed especially for the game by David Acton.

== Repton ports, clones and derivatives ==
=== Ports ===
The Repton games were closely associated with the BBC Micro and Acorn Electron but versions were released for other 8-bit computers. Superior Software had planned to launch Repton 3 with ports for the Commodore 64 and Amstrad CPC (as shown in pre-release press advertisements). The Amstrad version was never released, but the C64 port did arrive in 1987. The first two games were later ported to the ZX Spectrum and released together as Repton Mania in 1989 using the joint Superior/Alligata name.

Under the name Superior Interactive, the original publishers re-released versions of Repton 1 (2003), Repton 2 (2004) and Repton 3, including all of the expansion games (2005), for Microsoft Windows. They also released a large pack of new levels for all three modern Repton ports named Repton Spectacular in 2010. Also in 2010, iRepton was released for the Apple iPhone / iPod Touch (ESZ Consulting / Superior Interactive). This has retro and enhanced graphics and sounds and new screens. In 2014 iRepton 3 was released for the iPad and iPhone, featuring the same level of graphic enhancements as iRepton 1, which also had an overhaul at the same time.

=== Clones and Derivatives ===
There was a public domain clone for the ZX Spectrum called Riptoff, which included a level editor. It was developed by Rick O'Neill, and was released on a 1991 Your Sinclair covertape.

A non-scrolling 5-level type-in called Pitfall Pete written by Jonathan Temple was also described as "'Repton' style" when it was published by BEEBUG in 1986 and expanded to 15 levels in 1991.

Repton's original author has written a public domain Java rocks-and-diamonds game, Rockz, which features elements in the vein of both Repton 2 and Boulder Dash.
