= Acorn Electron =

Personal computer sold in Britain

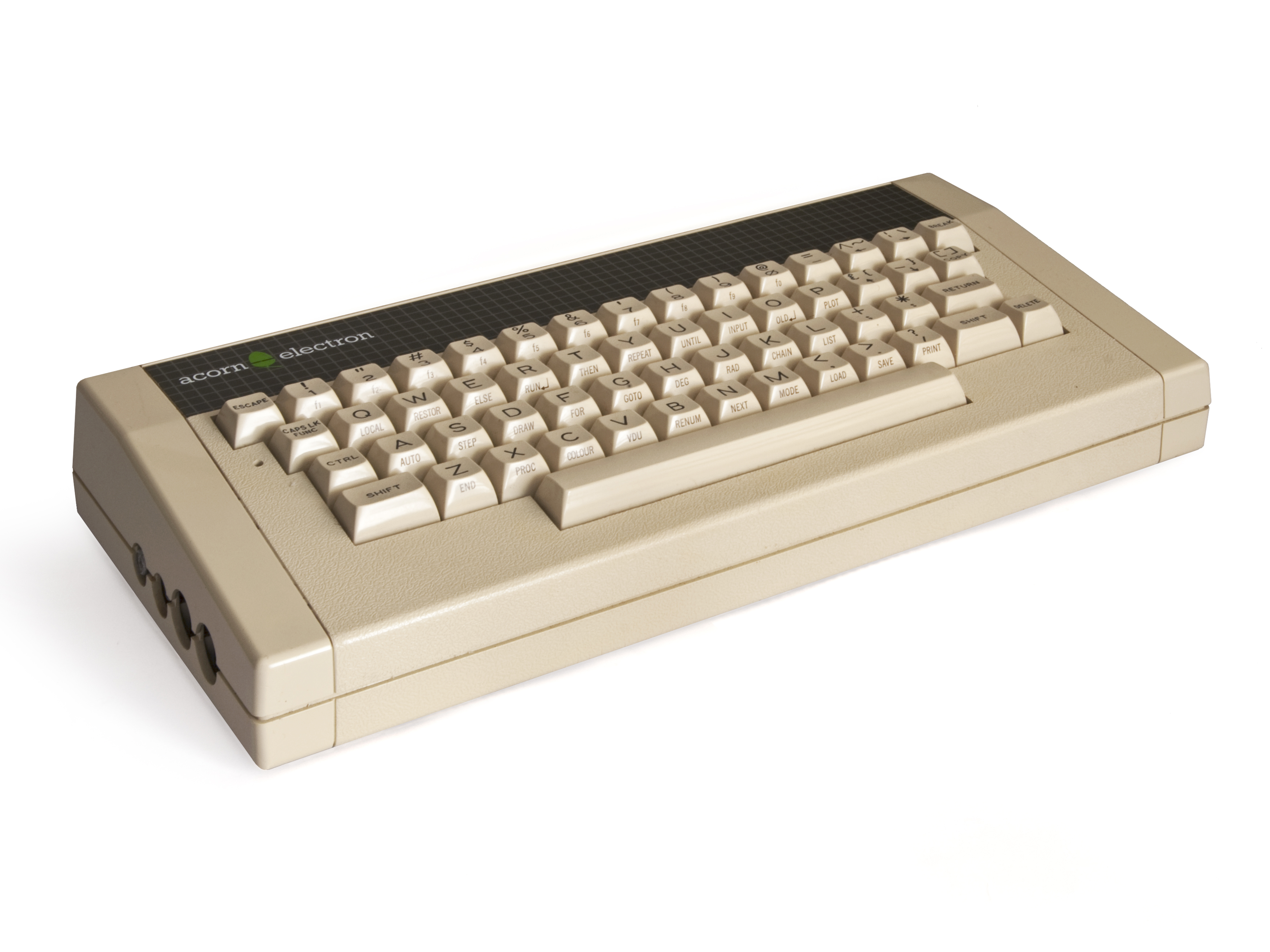
- Developer: Acorn Computers
- Type: 8-bit microcomputer
- Released: 25 August 1983; 43 years ago
- Introductory price: £199 (equivalent to £700 in 2025)
- Media: Cassette tape, floppy disk (optional), ROM cartridge (optional)
- Operating system: Acorn MOS v1.0
- CPU: Synertek SY6502A @ 2 MHz when accessing ROM; 1 MHz when accessing RAM
- Memory: 32 KB RAM, 32 KB ROM
- Display: RF modulator, composite video, RGB monitor output, 160×256 (4 or 16 colours), 320×256 (2 or 4 colours), 640×256 (2 colours), 320×200 (2 colours – spaced display with two blank horizontal lines following every 8 pixel lines), 640×200 (2 colours – spaced display)
- Graphics: Ferranti Semiconductor Custom ULA
- Sound: Tone and noise generation
- Input: Keyboard

The Acorn Electron (nicknamed the Elk inside Acorn and beyond) was introduced as a lower-cost alternative to the BBC Micro educational/home computer, also developed by Acorn Computers, to provide many of the features of that more expensive machine at a price more competitive with that of the ZX Spectrum. It has 32 kilobytes of RAM, and its ROM includes BBC BASIC II together with the operating system. Announced in 1982 for a possible release the same year, it was eventually introduced on 25 August 1983 priced at £199.

The Electron is able to save and load programs onto audio cassette via a cable, originally supplied with the computer, connecting it to any standard tape recorder with the appropriate sockets. It is capable of bitmapped graphics, and can use either a contemporary television set, a colour (RGB) monitor or a monochrome monitor as its display. Several expansions were made available to provide many of the capabilities omitted from the BBC Micro. Acorn introduced a general-purpose expansion unit, the Plus 1, offering analogue joystick and parallel ports, together with cartridge slots into which ROM cartridges, providing software, or other kinds of hardware expansions, such as disc interfaces, could be inserted. Acorn also produced a dedicated disc expansion, the Plus 3, featuring a disc controller and 3.5-inch floppy drive.

For a short period, the Electron was reportedly the best selling micro in the United Kingdom, with an estimated 200,000 to 250,000 machines sold over its entire commercial lifespan. With production effectively discontinued by Acorn as early as 1985, and with the machine offered in bundles with games and expansions, later being substantially discounted by retailers, a revival in demand for the Electron supported a market for software and expansions without Acorn's involvement. Its market for games also helped to sustain the continued viability of games production for the BBC Micro.

== History ==
BASIC prompt after switch-on or hard reset (soft reset was similar but did not contain the Acorn trademark).

After Acorn Computers released the BBC Micro, executives believed that the company needed a less expensive computer for the mass market. In May 1982, when asked about the recently announced Sinclair ZX Spectrum's potential to hurt sales of the BBC Micro, priced at £125 for the 16K model compared to around twice that price for the 16K BBC Model A, Acorn co-founder Hermann Hauser responded that in the third quarter of that year Acorn would release a new £120–150 computer which "will probably be called the Electron", a form of "miniaturised BBC Micro", having 32 KB of RAM and 32 KB of ROM, with "higher resolution graphics than those offered by the Spectrum". Acorn co-founder Chris Curry also emphasised the Electron's role as being "designed to compete with the Spectrum... to get the starting price very low, but not preclude expansion in the long term."

=== Development ===
In order to reduce component costs, and to prevent cloning, the company reduced the number of chips in the Electron from the 102 on the BBC Micro's motherboard to "something like 12 to 14 chips" with most functionality on a single 2,400-gate Uncommitted Logic Array (ULA).

The operating system ROM locations 0xFC00-0xFFFF contain the details of some members of the Electron's design team, these differing somewhat from those listed in the corresponding message in the BBC Model B ROM:

(C) 1983 Acorn Computers Ltd. Thanks are due to the following contributors to the development of the Electron (among others too numerous to mention):- Bob Austin, Astec, Harry Barman, Paul Bond, Allen Boothroyd, Ben Bridgewater, Cambridge, John Cox, Chris Curry, 6502 designers, Jeremy Dion, Tim Dobson, Joe Dunn, Ferranti, Steve Furber, David Gale, Andrew Gordon, Martyn Gilbert, Lawrence Hardwick, Hermann Hauser, John Herbert, Hitachi, Andy Hopper, Paul Jephcot, Brian Jones, Chris Jordan, Computer Laboratory, Tony Mann, Peter Miller, Trevor Morris, Steve Parsons, Robin Pain, Glyn Phillips, Brian Robertson, Peter Robinson, David Seal, Kim Spence-Jones, Graham Tebby, Jon Thackray, Topexpress, Chris Turner, Hugo Tyson, John Umney, Alex van Someren, Geoff Vincent, Adrian Warner, Robin Williamson, Roger Wilson.

Additionally, the last bytes of both the BASIC ROM and the Plus 3 interface's ADFS v1.0 ROM include the word "Roger", thought to be a reference to Roger Wilson. The case was designed by industrial designer Allen Boothroyd of Cambridge Product Design.

=== Release ===
Reports during the second half of 1982 indicated a potential December release, with Curry providing qualified confirmation of such plans, together with an accurate depiction of the machine's form and capabilities, noting that the "massive ULA" would be the "dominant factor" in any pre-Christmas release. As the end of the year approached, the machine itself was pictured in press reports. With the ULA not ready for "main production", however, the launch of the Electron was to be delayed until the spring.

By June 1983, with the planned March release having passed, the launch of the Electron had been rescheduled for the Acorn User Exhibition in August 1983, and the machine was indeed launched at the event. The company expected to ship the Electron before Christmas, and sell 100,000 by February 1984. The price at launch – £199 – remained unchanged from that stated in an announcement earlier in the year, with the machine's nickname within Acorn – the "Elk" – also being reported publicly for perhaps the first time.

Reviews were generally favourable, starting with positive impressions based on the physical design of the computer, with one reviewer noting, "The Electron is beautifully designed and built – quite a shock compared to the BBC. Its designer case will look great on the coffee table." Praise was also forthcoming for the Electron's keyboard which was regarded as being better than most of its low-cost peers, with only the VIC-20 being comparable. In one review, the keyboard was even regarded as better than the one in the BBC Micro. The provision of rapid BASIC keyword entry though the combination of the FUNC key with various letter keys was also welcomed as a helpful aid to prevent typing errors by "most users", while "touch typists" were still able to type out the keywords in full.

Reviewers also welcomed the machine's excellent graphics compared to its rivals, noting that "the graphics are much more flexible and the maximum resolution is many times that of the Spectrum's". The provision of screen modes supporting 80 columns of readable text and graphics resolutions of 640×256 was described as "unrivalled by every machine up to the BBC Model B itself", although the absence of a teletext mode was considered regrettable. Although valued for its low memory usage characteristics in the BBC Micro, one reviewer considered the absence of a "software simulation of a teletext screen" to be a "lazy omission" even if it would have to be "awfully slow and take up piles of memory".

While its speed was acceptable compared to its immediate competition, the Electron was, however, rather slower than the BBC Micro with one review noting that games designed for the BBC Micro ran "at less than half the speed, with very significant effects on their appeal". The reduced performance can be attributed to the use of a 4-bit wide memory system instead of the 8-bit wide memory system of the BBC Micro to reduce cost. Due to needing two accesses to the memory instead of one to fetch each byte, along with contention with the video hardware also needing access, reading or writing RAM was much slower than on the BBC Micro. Reviewers were also disappointed by the single-channel sound, noting that "BBC-style music" and its "imitations of various musical instruments" would not be possible, the latter due to the inability of the sound system to vary the amplitude of sounds.

Despite some uncertainty about Acorn's target demographic for the Electron, some noted the potential for the machine in education given its robustness, but also given its price, noting that the high price of BBC Model B machines seemed "rarely justified by their actual practical applications in schools". The introduction of the Electron was seen as potentially leading to competition between Acorn's different models within the schools market rather than creating a broader audience for them, although the potential for more computers in schools, giving more "hands-on" experience for students, was welcomed. Nevertheless, reviewers anticipated that the Electron would sell well at the lower end of the market, with projected sales of 100,000 units by Christmas 1983, helped by the Electron's software compatibility with the BBC Micro and the already established reputation of its predecessor. With parents potentially being convinced of the Electron's educational value, some reviewers foresaw a conflict between parents and "discerning children", the latter merely wanting to play games and preferring models with sound and graphics capabilities more appropriate for gaming.

Although Acorn had based its expansion into the United States on the BBC Micro, the company did have plans to introduce the Electron at a later time, with Chris Curry having indicated "a very heavy push overseas" involving both the BBC Micro and Electron. A model for the US market was described in an official book, The Acorn Guide to the Electron, but this model was never produced. The Electron was distributed in various other markets and was reviewed by home computing publications in countries such as Norway, West Germany, and New Zealand.

=== Production and volume delivery ===
Production difficulties at Astec in Malaysia delayed the machine's introduction, forcing Acorn to look to other manufacturers such as AB Electronics in Wales and Wongs in Hong Kong (an original equipment manufacturer making over 30 million circuit boards a year, along with power supplies and plastic housings, for companies such as IBM, Xerox, Atari, and Apple, including units made for Acorn for the BBC Micro). By October 1983, Acorn had received orders for more than 150,000 units, but had production targets of only 25,000 a month before Christmas, meaning that the existing backlog would take more than six months to fulfil. Demand for the Electron was high but only two of WH Smith's London branches had inventory. With production yet to reach "full capacity" at Astec, Acorn conceded that only 60,000 units would be sold before Christmas.

Additional manufacturing for the Electron had been anticipated to commence as early as the end of November 1983 in Hong Kong, and in January 1984 in Wales, the latter slipping to April 1984 but increasing the production rate to up to 40,000 units a month. Ultimately, manufacturing in Malaysia ceased with the anticipated but unspecified number of units having been produced, this having been originally reported as 100,000 units. Acorn's marketing manager, Tom Hohenberg, admitted in early 1984 that "a lot of the trouble stemmed from the ULA" in getting production to the desired levels, but that such difficulties had been resolved, although Acorn faced an order backlog of almost a quarter of a million units.

As the company increased production during 1984, however, the British home computer market greatly weakened. Hohenberg later noted that after the 1983 Christmas season, Electron deliveries had increased to meet a demand that was no longer there, with the market having "completely dried up". Acorn's Christmas 1984 sales were greatly below expectations and by March 1985 the company had reduced the Electron's price to £129. With the company's unsuccessful expansion into the United States abandoned, Acorn's financial situation had deteriorated sufficiently to prompt Olivetti to rescue the company by taking a 49.30% ownership stake. Renewed efforts were made to sell the machine, bundling it with Acorn's own expansions and software, such as one package adding the Plus 1 expansion, joysticks and a ROM cartridge game to the base machine for a total price of £219. Acorn committed to supporting the machine "until the end of 1986", continuing to supply it (as the Merlin M2105) to British Telecom as part of the Healthnet communications system, with small-scale manufacturing continuing while existing stocks were being run down.

By autumn, retailers appeared eager to discount the computer, with prices in stores as low as £100, reportedly less than the distributor prices of the summer months. As the Christmas season approached, Dixons Retail acquired the remaining Electron inventory to sell, bundled with a cassette recorder and software, at a retail price of £99.95. This deal, from the perspective of a year later, apparently played a significant part in helping to reduce Acorn's unsold inventory from a value of £18 million to around £7.9 million, and in combination with "streamlining corporate activities and reducing overheads", had helped to reduce Acorn's losses from over £20 million to less than £3 million.

The deal effectively brought to an end Acorn's interest in the Electron and the lower-cost end of the home computing market, but empowered third-party suppliers whose "inventiveness and initiative" was noted as being in contrast with Acorn's lack of interest in the product and the "false promises" made to its users. However, Acorn subsequently released the Master Compact – a model in the Master series of microcomputers with fewer BBC Micro-style ports and a similar expansion connector to that used by the Electron – with the home audience specifically in mind. Indeed, prior to its release, the Master Compact had been perceived as the successor to the Electron. Superficial similarities between the Compact and Acorn Communicator, together with technical similarities between the Electron (particularly when expanded in the form of the Merlin M2105) and the Communicator, may also have driven rumours of an updated Electron model. A more substantial emphasis on the "home, music and hobby sectors" came with the appointment of a dedicated marketing manager in 1989 following the launch of the BBC A3000 in the Acorn Archimedes range.

== Hardware ==
Much of the core functionality of the BBC Micro – the video and memory controller, cassette input/output, timers and sound generation – was replicated using a single customised ULA chip designed by Acorn in conjunction with Ferranti, albeit with only one sound channel instead of three (and one noise channel), and without the character-based Teletext Mode 7.

The keyboard includes a form of quick keyword input, similar to that used on the Sinclair ZX Spectrum, through use of the FUNC key in combination with other keys labelled with BASIC keywords. However, unlike the Spectrum, this method of rapid keyword entry is optional, and keywords can be entered manually if preferred.

The edge connector on the rear of the Electron exposes all address and data bus lines from the CPU, including the upper eight bits of the address bus, in contrast to the limited selection available via the BBC Micro's expansion ports, with the One Megahertz Bus as the principal mechanism for general purpose expansion on the BBC Micro only providing the lower eight bits of the address bus. In addition, various control signals provided by the CPU and ULA are exposed via the Electron's expansion connector.

The ULA mediates access to 32 KB of addressable RAM using four 4164 DRAMs (64 K×1 bit), sharing the RAM between the CPU and the video signal generation (or screen refresh) performed by the ULA itself. Two accesses have to be made to the RAM to get each byte (albeit with a single RAS), delivering a maximum transfer rate to or from RAM of one byte per 2 MHz cycle. In generating the video signal, the ULA is able to take advantage of this 2 MHz bandwidth when producing the picture for the high-bandwidth screen modes. Due to signalling constraints, the CPU can only access RAM at 1 MHz, even when it is not competing with the video system.

When the ULA is consuming all of the RAM bandwidth during the active portion of a display line, the CPU is unable to access the RAM. (The Electron uses the Synertek variant of the 6502 processor as that allowed the clock to be stopped for this 40 microsecond period.) In other modes the CPU and video accesses are interleaved with each accessor acquiring bytes at 1 MHz.

In contrast, the BBC Micro employs one or two sets of eight 16-kilobit devices, with the RAM running at twice the speed (4 MHz) of the CPU (2 MHz), allowing the video system (screen refresh) and CPU memory accesses to be interleaved, with each accessor able to transfer bytes at 2 MHz. The RAM access limitations imposed by the Electron's ULA therefore reduce the effective CPU speed by as much as a factor of four relative to the BBC Micro in the more demanding display modes, and as much as a factor of two otherwise. Byte transfers from ROM occur at 2 MHz, however.

For issue 1–4 motherboards, the ULA had an issue similar to those experienced by other socketed CPUs. Over time, the thermal heating and cooling could cause the ULA to rise slightly out of its socket just enough to cause the machine to hang or freeze and for other issues to occur preventing the start-up of the machine, in some cases causing the initial beep or tone to sound continuously. This was despite a metal cover and a locking-bar mechanism designed to prevent this from occurring. Pushing down on the metal cover to reseat the ULA was normally sufficient to rectify these issues. Issue 5 and 6 boards utilized a different ULA type, this being known as the Aberdeen ULA (as opposed to the earlier Ferranti ULA) which was mounted on a board that was directly soldered to the main board, with the chip being covered by epoxy resin "insulating material". This arrangement dispensed with the 68-pin socket, and this new type of ULA was expected to be "less prone to failure". This type of ULA was also used on the German release of the Electron mainboard which is designated by the marking "GERMAN ELECTRON Issue 1" on the mainboard rather than just "ELECTRON" as for the UK model.

=== Technical specifications ===
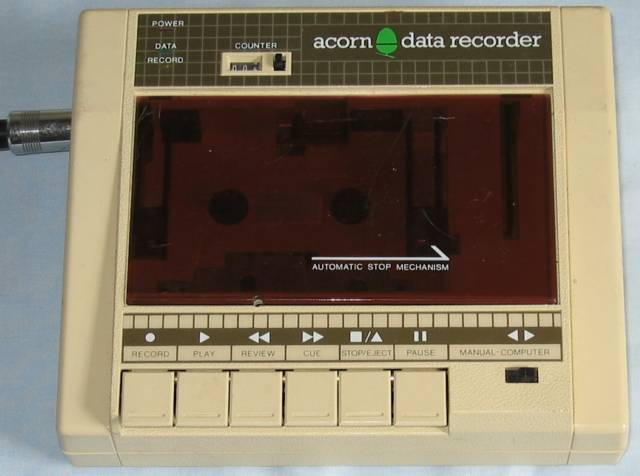
Acorn ALF03 Data Recorder

The hardware specification according to official documentation, combined with more technical documentation and analysis is as follows:

- CPU: Synertek SY6502A
- Clock rate: variable. CPU runs at 2 MHz when accessing ROM and 1 MHz when accessing RAM. The CPU is also periodically halted. (Note: The Electron is widely misquoted as operating at 1.79 MHz after measurements derived from speed testing against the 2 MHz BBC Micro for various pieces of 'common software'.)
- Glue logic: Ferranti Semiconductor Custom ULA
- RAM: 32 KB
- ROM: 32 KB
- Graphics modes: 160×256 pixels (20×32 characters) in 4 or 16 colours, 320×256 (40×32 characters) in 2 or 4 colours, 640×256 (80×32 characters) in 2 colours
- Text modes: 40×25 characters in 2 colours, 80×25 characters in 2 colours (Note: Text modes are provided using display modes with the appropriate horizontal resolution (320 or 640 pixels), with each character row being 8 pixels high, and with 2 blank display lines being introduced between character rows.)
- Colours: 8 colours (TTL combinations of RGB primaries) + 8 flashing versions of the same colours
- Sound: 1 channel of sound, 7 octaves; built-in speaker. Software emulation of noise channel supported
- Keyboard: 56 key "full travel QWERTY keyboard"
- Dimensions: 16×34×6.5 cm
- I/O ports: Expansion port, tape recorder connector (1200 baud CUTS variation on the Kansas City standard for data encoding, via a 7-pin circular DIN connector), aerial TV connector (RF modulator), composite video and RGB monitor output
- Power supply: External PSU, 19 V AC

The composite video output provides a greyscale image on the standard machine, but an internal modification allows a colour image to be produced, albeit with a degradation in picture quality. Acorn ostensibly intended the composite output to be a high-quality output for monochrome monitors, with the RGB output being the preferred high-quality output for colour images.

=== Merlin M2105 ===
An unusual variant of the Electron was sold by British Telecom Business Systems as the BT Merlin M2105 Communications Terminal, being previewed by British Telecom at the Communications '84 show. This consisted of a rebadged Electron plus a large expansion unit containing 32 KB of battery-backed RAM (making up 64 KB of RAM in total), up to 64 KB of ROM resident in four sockets (making up to 96 KB of ROM in total), a Centronics printer port, an RS423 serial port, a modem, and the speech generator previously offered for the BBC Micro. The ROM firmware provided dial-up communications facilities, text editing and text messaging functions. The complete product included a monitor and dot-matrix printer.

Initially trialled in a six-month pilot at 50 florists, with the intention of rolling out to all 2,500 members of the UK network, these were used by the Interflora florists network in the UK for over a decade. Used mostly for sending messages, despite providing support for other applications, limited availability of the product led Interflora to look for alternatives after five years, although users appeared to be happy with the product as it was.

This generic product combination of the Electron and accompanying expansion was apparently known as the Chain during development, itself having a different board layout, with British Telecom having intended the M2105 to be a product supporting access to an online service known as Healthnet. This service aimed to improve and speed up communications within hospitals so that patients could be treated and discharged more quickly, and to facilitate transfers of information to doctors and health workers outside hospitals, with communications taking place over conventional telephone lines. The service was to be introduced in the Hammersmith and Fulham district health authority, with installation starting at Charing Cross Hospital. The Electron was said to be particularly suitable for deployment in this application in that it had a "large expansion bus", ostensibly making the machine amenable to the necessary adaptations required for the role, together with its "price, and the fact it has a real keyboard". As a Healthnet terminal, the M2105 was intended to support the exchange of forms, letters and memos.

The adoption of an Acorn product in this role was perhaps also unusual in that much of BT's Merlin range of this era had been supplied by ICL, notably the M2226 small business computer and M3300 "communicating word processor". Nevertheless, the M2105 offered interoperability with other BT products such as the QWERTYphone which was able to receive messages from the M2105 and the Merlin Tonto.

The hardware specifications of the M2105, observed from manufactured units, include the 6502 CPU (SY6502 or R6502), ULA and 32 KB of dynamic RAM fitted in the Electron main unit, plus 32 KB of static RAM, two 6522 VIA devices for interfacing, AM2910PC modem, SCN2681A UART, and TMS5220 plus TMS6100 for speech synthesis. The speech synthesis was used for the "voice response" function which answered incoming voice calls by playing a synthesised message to the caller. The components chosen and the capabilities provided (excluding speech synthesis) are broadly similar to those featured by the Acorn Communicator which was another product of Acorn's custom systems division.

The product documentation indicates a specification with 48 KB of RAM plus 16 KB of "non volatile CMOS RAM" and 96 KB of ROM, although this particular composition of RAM is apparently contradicted by the RAM devices present on surviving M2105 machines. However, the earlier Chain variant of the board does appear to provide only 16 KB of static RAM using two HM6264LP-15 chips, also providing an extra 16 KB of dynamic RAM using eight MK4516-15 chips, suggesting that the product evolved during development.

=== Recreations and emulators ===
Several emulators of the machine exist:

1. ElectrEm (Windows, Linux, Mac)
2. Elkulator (Windows, Linux)
3. ElkJS is a browser-based emulator
4. Multi-system emulators MESS and Clock Signal support the Electron.

Electron software is predominantly archived in the UEF file format.

There are also two publicly documented FPGA based recreations of the Acorn Electron hardware: ElectronFPGA for the Papilio Duo hardware and the Acorn-Electron core for the FPGA Arcade "Replay" board. In addition, an implementation of the ULA for the Lattice ICE40 series has been made available.

== Software ==
A range of titles were made available on cassette at the launch of the Electron through the Acornsoft publishing arm of Acorn, including a number of games, the Forth and Lisp languages, and a handful of other educational and productivity titles. Acorn's decision to provide the Electron with a degree of compatibility with the BBC Micro meant that a number of titles already available for the older machine could be expected to run on its new machine, with only minor cosmetic issues occurring when running some titles. Of the Acornsoft languages, the existing Forth and Lisp language releases worked on the Electron, these being re-released specially for the machine, together with BCPL and Microtext, an authoring system offering programming facilities, which remained BBC-only releases. Games such as Chess and Snooker, plus a number of other titles were also established as being compatible prior to launch. Various applications in Acornsoft's View suite, together with the languages COMAL, Logo and ISO Pascal, were reported as being compatible with the Electron, as were some titles from BBC Soft and other developers.

=== Languages ===
A significant selling point for the Electron was its built-in BBC BASIC interpreter, providing a degree of familiarity from the BBC Micro along with a level of compatibility with the earlier machine. However, as had been the case with the BBC Micro, support for other languages was quickly forthcoming, facilitated by the common heritage of the two systems.

In addition to the early releases, Forth and Lisp, Acornsoft released the Pascal subset, S-Pascal, on cassette and followed up with an ISO Pascal implementation on ROM cartridge, the latter providing two 16 KB ROMs containing a program editor and a Pascal compiler producing intermediate code that required Pascal run-time routines to be loaded. As a more minimal implementation, S-Pascal made use of the machine's built-in BASIC program editing facilities and provided a compiler generating assembly language that would then be assembled, generating machine code for direct execution. ISO Pascal had Oxford Pascal as a direct competitor offering a range of features differentiating it from Acornsoft's product, notably a compiler that could produce a stand-alone "relocatable 6502 machine-code file". Acornsoft later released the ISO Pascal Stand Alone Generator product for the BBC Micro and Master series, permitting the generation of executable programs embedding "sections of the interpreter" required by each program, with such executables being subject to various licensing restrictions.

Acornsoft Forth, aiming for compliance with the Forth-79 standard, was regarded as "an excellent implementation of the language". It saw competition from Skywave Software's Multi-Forth 83 which was delivered on a ROM chip, supported the Forth-83 standard, and provided a multitasking environment. Future availability of Multi-Forth 83 on ROM cartridge was advertised.

With the launch of the Plus 1, Acornsoft Lisp was also made available on cartridge. This Lisp implementation provided only the "bare essentials" of a Lisp system that "a small micro such as the Electron" could hope to be able to support. However, with the interpreter and initialised workspace being loaded from cassette into RAM in the earlier release, one stated advantage of the ROM version was the availability of more memory for use by programs, with the immediacy of a Lisp system provided as a language ROM being an implicit benefit.

Acornsoft provided two products offering different degrees of support for the Logo programming language. Turtle Graphics was a cassette-based product, available alongside Forth, Lisp and S-Pascal amongst the first titles released for the Electron, featuring a subset of Logo focused on the interactive aspects of the language. Acornsoft Logo was provided on ROM cartridge and offered a vocabulary of over 200 commands as part of a more comprehensive implementation of the language, exposing its list processing foundations. Turtle Graphics was substantially cheaper than Logo: by 1987, the former had been reportedly discounted to under £3 whereas the latter cost "less than £30". Unlike other Acornsoft language products, however, Logo was supplied with "two thick manuals".

=== Applications ===
Acornsoft made a number of applications available for the Electron. In early 1985, the View word processor and ViewSheet spreadsheet applications, familiar from the BBC Micro, were released on ROM cartridge for use with the Electron expanded with a Plus 1, priced at £49.50 each. By running directly from ROM, these applications were able to dedicate all of the machine's available RAM to their documents, and using general filing system mechanisms, documents could be loaded from and saved to cassette or disc, although disc users could also use commands that took advantage of that faster, random-access medium. Cassette-based operation was still regarded as "perfectly feasible" since the software itself did not need to be loaded, with loading and saving operations in View achieving about 800 words per minute and in ViewSheet achieving around 200 cells per minute.

When using View in Mode 6, providing a 40-column, 25-line display occupying 8 KB of memory, around 20 KB of RAM was available to cassette-based systems or to disc-based systems using products such as the Cumana Floppy Disc System that also maintained PAGE at &E00, this corresponding to about 10 or 11 A4 pages of text. In Mode 3, providing an 80-column, 25-line display occupying 16 KB, around 6 or 7 A4 pages of text could be retained in memory. Acorn's Plus 3 disc system reduced this workspace by a further 4 KB. However, documents could be broken up into sections to be processed individually by View. Operation in the 80-column Mode 0 and Mode 3 was reported as being "sometimes slow" due to the Electron's hardware architecture, but View supported horizontal scrolling across documents, permitting the use of a 40-column mode to edit wider documents.

ViewSheet could also operate in different display modes, with spreadsheets of approximately 1600 cells being editable in Mode 6 and around 800 cells in Mode 3. A windowing system was provided that permitted ten different views of a spreadsheet to be displayed on screen at once, and recalculation operations were reported to be "around ten seconds for quite a large model". Reviewers considered the View and ViewSheet applications to be "professional" and to "compare well with similar software sold for much more expensive machines" such as the IBM PC, with WordStar being noted as a broadly similar package to View. Compatibility with the same programs on the BBC Micro made a complete Electron-based system an attractive, low-cost, entry-level word processing and spreadsheet system. However, View's printing support was criticised as inadequate without the use of a companion printer driver program.

Acornsoft did not release its ViewStore database program specifically for the Electron, but the software was reported as being compatible, albeit with function key combinations different to those documented for the BBC Micro. However, Acornsoft did release a product, Database, on 3.5-inch diskette for use with the Electron upgraded with the Plus 3 expansion. The product provided a suite of programs for the creation, maintenance and analysis of structured data files, visualising records using a card index user interface metaphor, and supporting sorting and searching operations on the stored data.

Slogger, an established provider of expansions, also produced productivity applications such as Starword, a word processor, and Starstore, a database. Starword provided separate command and editing modes familiar from Acornsoft's View, also supporting 132-column documents and horizontal scrolling for the editing of such wider documents. Along with other operations familiar from View, such as search and replace functions, block-based editing, and control over text justification, it had built-in support for customising documents for output using a mail merge function. Available on ROM for fitting to a ROM expansion such as Slogger's Rombox or inside a separately purchased ROM cartridge, and reportedly developed specifically for the Electron, Starword was considered "comprehensive and powerful".

Starstore, also available on ROM, provided a database management suite primarily aimed at users of cassette storage, with databases being entirely resident in RAM. It supported database definition, data editing, searching, sorting and printing activities. Various features complemented Starword, such as mail merge integration. Starstore II followed on as an alternative to, as opposed to a direct successor of, the earlier Starstore product by requiring a disc-based system and permitting databases to be as large as the amount of free space on any given disc. Its user interface was improved over the earlier product, offering pop-up menus and cursor-based navigation.

Computer Concepts' Wordwise Plus, developed from the company's earlier Wordwise product for the BBC Micro and launched in early 1985, was made available for use with the Electron expanded with the E2P-6502 second processor cartridge. The original Wordwise product was incompatible with the Electron due to its use of Mode 7 (the BBC Micro's 40-column Teletext display mode), and being supplied on a ROM chip, it could also not be readily added to the Electron without appropriate expansions. Available from Permanent Memory Systems, producers of the E2P-6502 cartridge, the Electron version of the software was the Hi-Wordwise Plus variant, supplied on disc instead of ROM, and designed to run on the second processor and to use the expanded memory provided in that environment. The program used the Electron's 40-column Mode 6 display.

Expansion manufacturers Advanced Computer Products and Slogger both made solutions available based on products from Advanced Memory Systems. ACP released a bundle of the AMX Mouse and AMX Art software for use with its Advanced Plus 5 expansion, also requiring a DFS-compatible disc system. Slogger produced a version of the desktop publishing package Stop Press for the Electron, requiring a DFS-compatible disc system, two spare ROM sockets, a mouse, and a suitable user port expansion, with Slogger producing its own user port expansion cartridge. Competing with these products but requiring only a disc system, AVP's Pixel Perfect offered a rudimentary desktop publishing solution, utilising the computer's high-resolution Mode 0 display.

=== Games ===
Of the twelve software titles announced by Acornsoft for the Electron at the machine's launch, six were games titles: Snapper, Monsters (a clone of Space Panic), Meteors (a clone of Asteroids), Starship Command, Chess, and the combined title Draughts and Reversi. When the Plus 1 expansion was launched in 1984, three of these titles – Hopper, Snapper and Starship Command – were among the six ROM cartridge titles available at launch, together with the adventure Countdown to Doom. Acornsoft would continue to release games including those based on existing arcade games such as Arcadians (based on Galaxian) and Hopper (based on Frogger), as well as original titles such as Free Fall and Elite.

Micro Power, already an established BBC Micro games publisher, also entered the Electron market at a relatively early stage, offering ten initial titles either converted from the BBC Micro, in the case of Escape from Moonbase Alpha and Killer Gorilla, or "completely re-written", in the case of Moonraider (due to differences in the screen handling between the machines). Superior Software, also a significant publisher for the BBC Micro, routinely released games for both machines, notably a licensed version of Atari's Tempest in 1985, but also successful original titles such as the Repton series of games, Citadel, Thrust and Galaforce. Superior's role in games publishing for the Acorn machines expanded in 1986 when the company acquired the right to use the Acornsoft brand, leading to the co-branding of games and compilations released by the company and the re-release of existing Acornsoft titles with this branding, Elite among them. The company would subsequently release another "masterpiece" with bundled novella – the 1988 game Exile – as well as numerous conversions and compilations.

By 1988, the "big three" full-price games publishers for the Acorn 8-bit market were identified as Superior Software, Audiogenic (ASL) and Tynesoft, with Top Ten and Alternative Software being the significant budget publishers, and other "strong contenders" being Godax, Mandarin and Bug Byte, this assessment made from the perspective of an established games author evaluating trustworthy publishers for aspiring authors. Commercial considerations motivated authors to make their games available for the Electron due to its importance in sales terms, representing "around half of the Acorn market", with it being regarded as "almost compulsory for any mainstream game" to have an Electron version "unless your game is a state-of-the-art masterpiece", with Revs, Cholo and Sentinel cited as such BBC Micro exclusives. Although the Electron imposed additional technical constraints on authors accustomed to the BBC Micro, some authors were able to use this to their creative advantage. For instance, of Frak! it was noted that the "Electron version is more popular, and considered better than the BBC version because it has a screen designer included".

Crystal Castles is an example of an arcade game officially ported to the Electron by US Gold.

Although not as well supported by the biggest software publishers as rivals like the Commodore 64 and Sinclair ZX Spectrum, a good range of games were available for the Electron including popular multi-format games such as Chuckie Egg. There were also many popular games officially converted to the Electron from arcade machines (including Crystal Castles, Tempest, Commando, Paperboy, and Yie Ar Kung-Fu) and other home computer systems (including Impossible Mission, Jet Set Willy, The Way of the Exploding Fist, Tetris, The Last Ninja, Barbarian, Ballistix, Predator, Hostages and SimCity).

Despite Acorn themselves effectively shelving the Electron in 1985, games continued to be developed and released by professional software houses until the early 1990s. There were around 1,400 games released for the Acorn Electron, several thousand extra public domain titles were released on disc through Public Domain libraries. Notable enterprises which produced discs of such software are BBC PD, EUG (Electron User Group) and HeadFirst PD.

=== Development considerations and techniques ===
Exile is an example of a game where the developers left non-graphical data visible in the display buffer to gain additional memory space.

Like the BBC Micro, the Electron is constrained by limited memory resources. Of the 32 KB RAM, 3½ KB is allocated to the OS at startup and at least 10 KB is taken up by the display buffer in contiguous display modes.

Although programs running on the BBC Micro can use the machine's 6522 chip to trigger interrupts at certain points in the update of each display frame, using these events to change the palette and potentially switching all colours to black, thus blanking regions of the screen and hiding non-graphical data that had been stored in screen memory, the Electron lacks such hardware capabilities as standard. However, it was found to be possible to take advantage of the characteristics of interrupts that were provided, permitting palette changes after the top 100 lines of each display frame, thus facilitating the blanking of either the top 100 or bottom 156 lines of the display. Many games took advantage of this, gaining storage by leaving non-graphical data in the disabled area. (Note: In this source, the "lines" appear to refer to character lines or multiples of 8 pixels, yielding 104 and 152 pixel lines respectively.)

Other games would simply load non-graphical data into the display and leave it visible as regions of apparently randomly coloured pixels. One notable example is Superior Software's Citadel.

Although page flipping is a hardware possibility, the limited memory forced most applications to do all their drawing directly to the visible screen, often resulting in graphical flicker or visible redraw. A notable exception is Players' Joe Blade series.

A number of unusual techniques were employed by some developers to work around apparent limitations of the hardware.

==== Firetrack: smooth vertical scrolling ====
Although programs can alter the position of the screen in memory, the non-linear format of the display means that vertical scrolling can only be done in blocks of 8 pixels without further work.

Firetrack, released on a compilation by Superior Software, exploits a division in the way the Electron handles its display – of the seven available graphics modes, two are configured so that the final two of every ten scanlines are blank and are not based on the contents of RAM. If 16 scanlines of continuous graphical data are written to a character-block-aligned portion of the screen then they will appear as a continuous block in most modes but in the two non-continuous modes they will be displayed as two blocks of eight scanlines, separated in the middle by two blank scanlines.

In order to keep track of its position within the display, the Electron maintains an internal display address counter. The same counter is used in both the continuous and non-continuous graphics modes and switching modes mid-frame does not cause any adjustment to the counter.

Firetrack switches from a non-continuous to a continuous graphics mode part way down the display. By using the palette to mask the top area of the display and taking care about when it changes mode it can shift the continuous graphics at the bottom of the display down in two pixel increments because the internal display counter is not incremented on blank scanlines during non-continuous graphics modes.

==== Exile: sampled speech ====
Exile turns the Electron's one channel output into a digital speaker for PCM output.

The speaker can be programmatically switched on or off at any time but is permanently attached to a hardware counter so is normally only able to output a square wave. But if set to a frequency outside the human audible range then the ear can't perceive the square wave, only the difference between the speaker being switched on and off. This gives the effect of a simple toggle speaker similar to that seen in the 48 KB Sinclair ZX Spectrum. Exile uses this to output 1-bit audio samples.

==== Frak! and Zalaga: polyphonic music ====
As part of their copy protection, illegal copies of Aardvark Software's Frak! and Zalaga would cause a pseudo-polyphonic rendition of Trumpet Hornpipe, the Captain Pugwash theme tune, to play endlessly rather than loading the game properly (Pugwash being a pirate). On the Electron version of Frak!, the tune was the main theme from "Benny Hill" (Boots Randolph's "Yakety Sax"). The polyphony was achieved via fast note-switching to achieve the necessary chords.

== Hardware expansions ==
Since the Electron provides only a selection of video output ports, a cassette port and the expansion connector, a range of additional expansions were produced to offer ports and connections to various peripherals. The first expansions were largely joystick and printer interfaces or sideways ROM boards. For instance, First Byte Computers developed an interface and software which allowed a "switched" joystick to be used with the majority of software titles. This interface became very popular and was sold by W.H. Smiths, Boots, Comet and hundreds of independent computer dealers, selling as many as 23,000 units over a two-year period, helped by a bundling agreement with Dixons.

Acorn's own expansion strategy was led by the Plus 1 which offered a combination of ports and cartridge connectors, followed by the Plus 3 disc drive unit, but by early 1986 the more general range of expansions had broadened to include floppy drive and RS423 interfaces, Teletext adapters, and other fundamental enhancements to the base machine.

=== Multi-function expansions ===
Since the Electron's expansion connector was the basis of practically all external hardware expansions for the machine, unless an expansion propagated this connector to others, as was done by the Acorn Plus 3, the capabilities of any given expansion would limit the capabilities of the expanded machine. Thus, expansions offering a single function, such as joystick ports or a printer port, would need to be disconnected if other capabilities were needed, and then reconnected later. Consequently, multi-function expansions offering a combination of different capabilities offered a significant degree of convenience as well as avoiding wear on the expansion connector.

Alongside announcements of Acorn's then-unreleased Plus 1, Solidisk previewed a General Purpose Interface for the Electron in early 1984 offering a Centronics printer port, switched joystick port, user port, sideways ROM sockets, and mini-cartridge sockets supported by the 6522 versatile interface adapter (VIA) chip. The Plus 1 itself was released in mid-1984, introducing the influential cartridge format for expansions ultimately used by several other companies.

==== Acorn Plus 1 ====
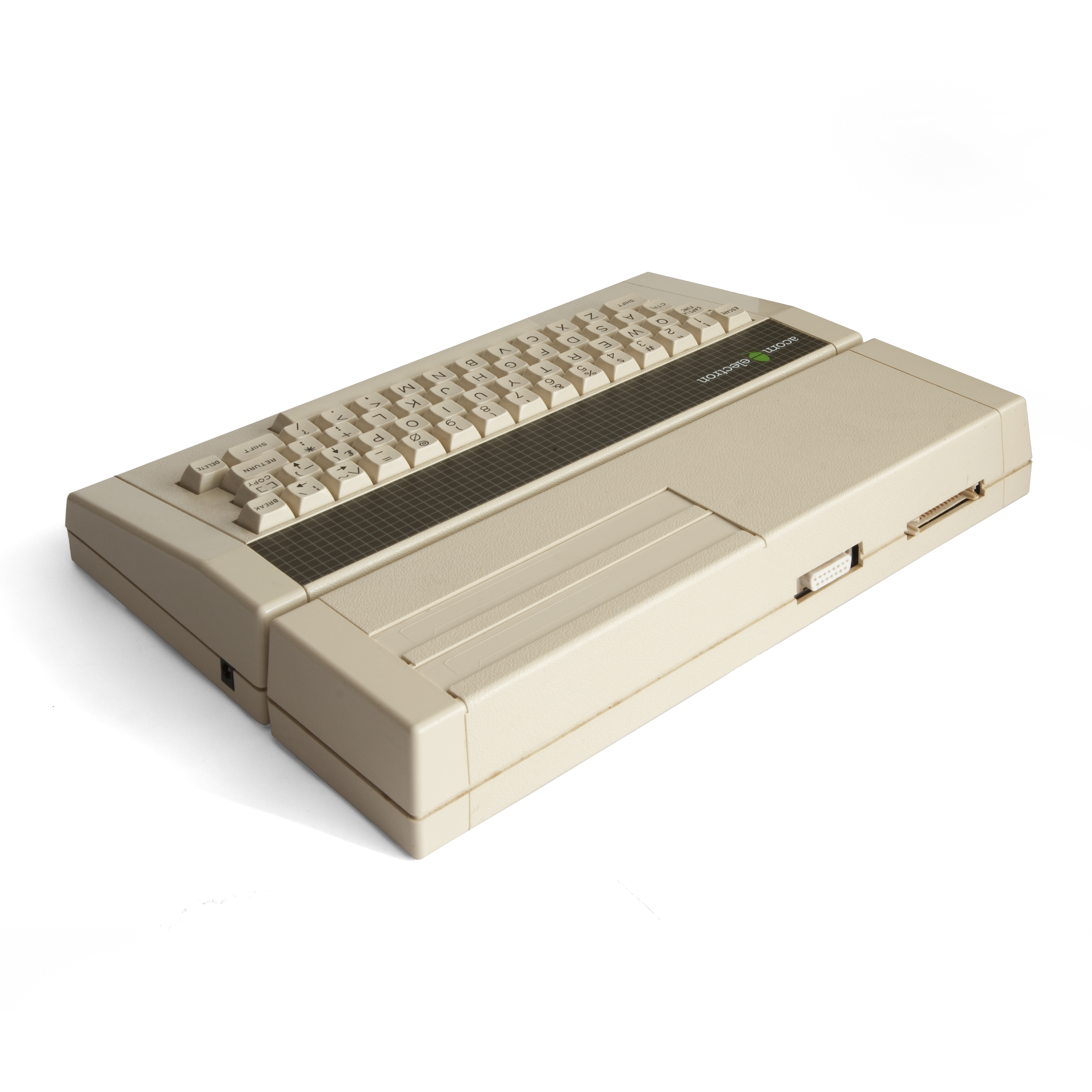
An Acorn Electron with Plus 1 expansion unit attached

The Acorn Plus 1 added two ROM cartridge slots, an analogue interface (supporting four channels) and a Centronics parallel port, priced at £59.90. The analogue interface was normally used for joysticks, although trackball and graphics tablet devices were available, and the parallel interface was typically used to connect a printer. Game ROM cartridges would boot automatically. Languages in paged ROM cartridges would take precedence over BASIC. (The slot at the front of the interface took priority if both were populated.)

Access to ROM occurs at 2 MHz until RAM access is required, so theoretically programs released on ROM can run up to twice as fast as those released on tape or disc. Despite this, all of the games released on ROM were packaged as ROM filing system cartridges, from which the micro would load programs into main memory in exactly the same way as if it were loading from tape. This meant that programs did not need to be modified for their new memory location and could be written in BASIC but gave no execution speed benefits. Six ROM cartridge titles were announced for the launch of the Plus 1: three arcade games, one adventure game, one educational title, and the Lisp language implementation, the latter being a genuine language ROM that "takes the place of the BASIC ROM" and is instantly available when switching on.

The cartridge slots provide additional control lines (compared to the lines available via the edge connector on the rear of the Electron) to ease implementation of ROM cartridges. Acorn described the hardware extension possibilities in promotional literature, giving an RS423 cartridge as an example of this capability of the Plus 1.

Additional peripheral cartridges were produced by companies such as Advanced Computer Products (and subsequently PRES) whose Advanced ROM Adaptor (ARA) and Advanced Sideways RAM (ASR) products provided sideways ROM and RAM capabilities, allowing ROM- or EPROM-based software to be accessed to provide languages, utilities and applications. ROM or EPROM devices containing the software could be physically inserted into empty ZIF sockets, or the software would be loaded from ROM image files (typically provided on disk) into RAM devices fitted in such sockets. Such RAM could potentially be powered by a battery and thus be able to retain its contents when the computer itself was powered off. Both such arrangements exposed the software in the same sideways memory region.

Such cartridge support enabled the Electron to provide the same functionality as that offered by the expansion ROM slots under the keyboard and on the bottom-left of the BBC Micro B keyboard. However, the need to use cartridge sockets for other peripherals encouraged PRES to develop the Advanced Plus 6 (AP6): an internal RAM and ROM board for the Plus 1 providing six sockets that could be freely used for ROM, EPROM and RAM devices. Installation of the AP6 unit required some modifications to the Plus 1, undertaken either by the user or by PRES, and the product could also be enhanced with the Advanced Plus 7 offering battery-backed RAM support for two 16 KB banks.

The addition of the Plus 1 added a number of new *FX or OSBYTE calls that allowed the OS to read values from the analogue interface and write to the parallel interface.

The Plus 1 needed memory page &D for its workspace, and the unit added some processing overhead when enabled, both of these things causing issues with the loading and running of software, particularly cassette-based games. To disable the Plus 1, after pressing BREAK, the following commands could be issued:

*FX163,128,1
?&212=&D6
?&213=&F1
?&2AC=0

An official application note described a similar set of commands to "remove the Plus One completely from the address map disabling the Centronics and A/D ports (additionally disabling the RS423 cartridge if fitted)".

===== Further developments =====
After Acorn's change of focus away from the Electron, and with a shortage of Plus 1 units available to purchase, Advanced Computer Products secured the rights to manufacture the unit under licence from Acorn, obtaining the injection moulds and tooling, thus restarting production in 1987 after Acorn's own production of the unit had ceased in November 1985. The Advanced Plus 2 (AP2) ROM was later sold by PRES as a replacement ROM for the Plus 1, of whose 8 KB utility ROM only 3 KB had been used, thus providing an opportunity for a more comprehensive ROM to be developed. The AP2 added ROM management commands familiar from the BBC Master series, support for various sideways RAM products from PRES, disc formatting and verification utilities for different ADFS versions, a command to disable the Plus 1 entirely, and improvements that made tape loading more reliable in "high memory" screen modes.

==== Slogger Rombox Plus ====
Following on from Slogger's earlier Rombox product – an expansion similar in profile to the Plus 1 but offering eight ROM sockets and propagating the expansion connector to other units – the Rombox Plus was positioned more directly as a competitor to the Plus 1 in that it offered two cartridge slots and a Centronics print port alongside four ROM sockets. Priced at £49.95, the unit was mostly compatible with cartridges designed for the Plus 1 although one reviewer reported physical issues with some expansion cartridges, suggesting some manufacturing inconsistencies given other users' more positive experiences, but indicated that it was still "worth considering as an alternative to the Plus 1". One review reported that the Cumana Electron Filing System cartridge had an edge connector that would not physically fit inside the slot in the Rombox Plus unit; this along with a perceived lack of robustness of the case being their only major reservations about the product. The product's support for utilising 8 KB RAM devices as a printer buffer, with buffer management provided by the built-in EPROM, was noted as a particular advantage over the Plus 1.

==== Slogger Remote Expansion and Plus 2 ====
In early 1989, Slogger announced its "remote expansion" (RX) system for the Electron, providing a separate case with power supply to house expansions and disc drives, able to support the weight of a monitor or television. Intended for the RX system, the Plus 2 offered two ROM cartridge slots compatible with the Plus 1, three ROM sockets, and RS423 and user port capabilities. One application of the user port was to connect a mouse, utilised by Slogger's version of the Stop Press desktop publishing package by Advanced Memory Systems.

==== Software Bargains Plus 1 ====
In mid-1989, Software Bargains announced an expansion providing different levels of Plus 1 functionality, offered as a bare printed circuit board without casing and in three different variants: the basic model offered one cartridge port and was bundled with View and Viewsheet cartridges for £29.95; an extended model offered one cartridge port and a printer port with the two bundled cartridges for £36.95; the full model offered two cartridge ports, printer port and the bundled cartridges for £39.95. Various board upgrade options were also offered between the variants, with the product being described mainly as a vehicle to expose the bundled software packages to as many as 150,000 owners of the estimated 200,000 Electrons in the UK who "have not yet been able to acquire or use View or Viewsheet". The lack of casing was considered the most significant disadvantage, with the absence of the analogue port deemed less critical due to a general lack of support for joysticks in many games.

=== Communications and networking ===
To support connectivity, Acorn announced a Plus 2 network interface with availability scheduled for early 1985, together with a RS423 cartridge for the Plus 1. Neither of these products were delivered as announced.

==== Acorn Plus 2 ====
The Acorn Plus 2 interface was due to provide Econet capability. This interface did not make it to market. However, an Econet interface was produced by Barson Computers in Australia and possibly other individuals and businesses.

==== Acorn Plus 4 ====
The Acorn Plus 4 interface was due to provide a modem communications capability.

==== Andyk RS423 cartridge ====
Andyk announced an RS423 cartridge for the Plus 1 providing a serial port, alongside other products, in late 1985. It was priced at £34.99.

==== Pace Tellstar/Nightingale ====
Originally reported in mid-1985 as a collaboration between Acorn and Pace Micro Technology, but launched in early 1986, Pace offered a communications product consisting of a RS423 cartridge, bundled with a Nightingale modem and Tellstar communications software, retailing at around £161 but discounted to £145. The substantially reduced price of the Electron itself created an opportunity that Pace was "exploiting nicely" with its telecommunications bundle, described by one commentator as "a marvellous opportunity to get a cheap Prestel set in addition to your normal computer".

==== Jafa Systems RS423 cartridge ====
Jafa Systems announced an RS423 cartridge in late 1989 to "fill a two year gap in the market", offering a serial connector compatible with the BBC Micro together with an on-board socket for 8 KB or 16 KB EPROM devices or for 32 KB RAM, the latter being configured to present two sideways RAM banks to the system. Write protect functionality was supported to prevent certain ROM software from attempting to overwrite itself if stored in RAM. The cartridge board itself was priced at around £30, with a case costing £5 extra, and an optional 32 KB RAM adding another £20. Support for the E00 ADFS offered by PRES for that company's AP3 disc system was indicated as an application for the sideways RAM.

==== Slogger Plus 2 RS423 interface ====
Slogger provided an RS423 interface as an option for its own Plus 2 expansion, announced in early 1989.

=== Disc interfaces ===
The first disc interface to be announced for the Electron was Pace's Le Box in 1984, offering a single-sided 100 KB floppy drive controlled by the 8271 controller and accessed using the Amcom Disc Filing System, with pricing at £299 plus VAT including the drive or around £199 without. The unit also provided eight sideways ROM sockets and was intended to sit under the Electron itself. The unit was connected via cabling to the expansion edge connector and included its own power supply, and other drives including switchable 40/80 track drives offering up to 400 KB capacity were dealer-supplied options. Although the product was meant to be on sale at the Acorn User Show in August 1984, and had been advertised, it was "discontinued" in early 1985 before getting to market, with a Pace representative indicating that prohibitive pricing of the 8271 chips (each at "over £80 at times") had left the company considering a re-launch of the product should the pricing situation become more favourable.

Following on from Acorn's Plus 3 interface, Cumana, Solidisk, Advanced Computer Products and Slogger all offered disc interfaces for the Electron. Unlike disc systems on the BBC Micro and the Acorn Plus 3, many of the systems released for the Electron did not claim RAM workspace (and raise the PAGE variable affecting applications above the default of &E00), making it easier to use cassette-based software transferred to disc and to run larger programs from disc.

Low-cost alternatives to disc systems, briefly made fashionable by press coverage of the Sinclair Microdrive, were reportedly under development by expansion suppliers such as Solidisk, and finished products such as the Phloopy looped tape system were offered for the Electron. Reliability issues were described with the Phloopy, and the product was apparently short-lived.

==== Acorn Plus 3 ====
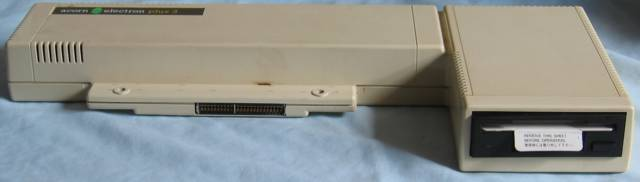
Acorn Plus 3, showing the connector and disc drive

Launched in late 1984 for a price of £229, the Acorn Plus 3 was a hardware module that connected independently of the Plus 1 and provided a "self contained disc interface and 3.5 inch single sided disc drive" offering over 300 KB of storage per disc using the newly introduced Advanced Disc Filing System (ADFS). The Plus 3 was also reportedly produced with a double-sided drive fitted.

An expansion connector for a second 3.5- or 5.25-inch drive was also provided by the unit, with such drives needing to provide a Shugart-compatible connector and their own power supply. The original Electron edge connector was repeated on the back of the Plus 3, allowing the Plus 1 or other compatible expansion to be connected in conjunction with the Plus 3.

The double-density drive of the Plus 3 was driven using a WD1770 drive controller by the ADFS. (The Plus 3 had been rumoured to offer Acorn's DFS and to feature an 8272 double-density disk controller before its launch.) Because the WD1770 is capable of single-density mode and uses the same IBM360-derived floppy disc format as the Intel 8271 found in the BBC Micro, it was also possible to use the Disc Filing System with an alternate ROM, such as the ACP 1770 DFS.

The Plus 3 reset PAGE to &1D00, reducing the amount of free RAM available to the user. The ADFS system could be temporarily disabled (and PAGE reset to &E00) via the *NOADFS command. Later products such as the PRES E00 ADFS remedied the memory demands of the ADFS, along with other issues suffered by the software as delivered with the Plus 3. If using the Plus 3 in screen modes 0–3, the pseudo-variable TIME would be thrown off, as the interrupts were disabled during disk access in these modes. The screen would also blank during disc accesses.

Disks had to be manually mounted and dismounted using the *MOUNT / *DISMOUNT commands, or using the Ctrl+A+Break key combination. Disks could also be booted from via the standard ⇧ Shift+Break key-combination, if the !BOOT file was present on the disk. This behaviour was the same as on the BBC Micro.

The Plus 3 included an uprated square black power supply unit with mains cord, manufactured by STC, designed and manufactured in England to BS 415 and BS 5850, that was designed to power the Plus 3, in addition to the Electron and the Plus 1 interface as well. This replaced the original cream-coloured "wall wart" style power supply, designed to BS 415 and manufactured in Hong Kong.

- Original Part no: 0201,113; input 220/240 V AC/50 Hz; output 19 V AC/0.737 A/14 W: Usage: Electron, Electron+Plus1
- Uprated Part no: 0865,010; input 240 V AC/50 Hz 50 W; output 21 V AC/1.75 A/36.75 W: Usage: Electron+Plus3, Electron+Plus3+Plus1

Repair note: If the internal power-supply connector, used to power the existing internal 3.5-inch drive is damaged, and requires replacement, then the original AMP 800-930 4-pin connector, which was already in short supply during the original production run, may be replaced with a Molex 5264 50-37-5043 "Mini-SPOX" connector as an alternative.

==== Advanced Plus 3 ====
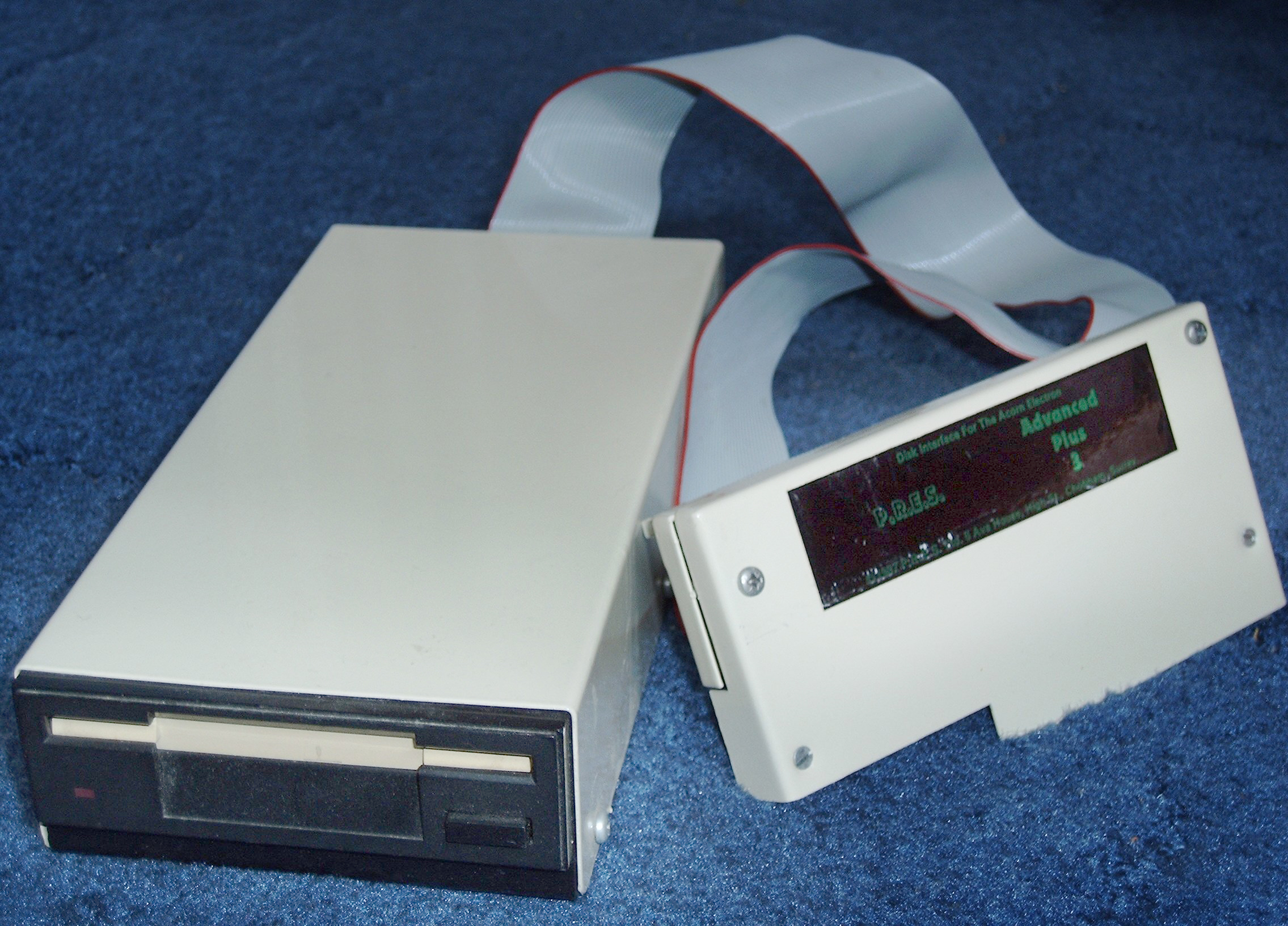
The PRES Advanced Plus 3 with a 3½-inch drive

Designed and produced by Baildon Electronics and sold by PRES, the Advanced Plus 3 (AP3) was a Plus 1 cartridge interface using the WD1770 controller, supplied with Acorn's ADFS and a single-sided 3½-inch disc drive for £99 plus VAT, offering equivalent functionality to the Acorn Plus 3. Announced in late 1987, the product was made possible by an agreement between ACP and Acorn to license the ADFS software. As with many disc interfaces for the Electron, since the interface provided a connector for the drive, this made it possible to connect a 5¼" floppy disc drive (more common amongst BBC Micro owners) or the more typical 3½-inch drive.

PRES later released a version of ADFS with support for PAGE at &E00, this being achieved by using RAM provided by the Advanced Battery Backed RAM (ABR) cartridge. This version also fixed two notable bugs in Acorn's ADFS, eliminating unreliability when accessing the first tracks on a disc which had previously necessitated the writing of a file (ZYSYSHELP) as a workaround, and switching off the text cursor during disc compaction which had previously caused disc corruption (since the disc data would be processed using screen memory during this operation, and the cursor would modify that data when blinking). The ROM image was supplied on disc for £17.19, whereas a bundle of the ROM image and ABR cartridge was £50.95. A separate ADFS version 1.1 product, offered as a 16 KB ROM, also provided these bug fixes. Advertised slightly earlier than the E00 ADFS, it also replaced the Winchester hard drive support traditionally found in ADFS with "'patches' for future enhancements". Such patches, present in both of these ADFS variants, amounted to support for a 256 KB RAM disc provided by the company's Advanced Quarter Meg RAM cartridge.

In 1989, the Advanced Plus 3 Mark 2 was launched, offering a double-sided drive in place of the single-sided drive previously offered. This meant that the storage capacity of each disc was increased from the 320 KB of the original Plus 3 to 640 KB (this being supported by ADFS on the Master Compact). A "complete package" including double-sided, double-density floppy drive was advertised for just under £150 including VAT.

==== Cumana Floppy Disc System ====
Early in 1985, Cumana released a cartridge-based interface providing support for double-density storage, a real-time clock and calendar for timestamping of files, and a spare ROM socket for user-fitted sideways ROMs. The filing system used was Cumana's own QFS, supporting 89 files per disc, PAGE at &E00, a non-hierarchical catalogue, ten-character filenames, with a format not directly compatible with either of Acorn's DFS or ADFS. The interface itself cost £149.95 when originally announced, but settled at around £115.95 including VAT, also being offered in a promotional bundle with a 5¼-inch drive for £224.15 including VAT. Later pricing put the interface at £74.95 including VAT.

==== Solidisk EFS ====
In mid-1985, Solidisk released a cartridge-based interface with support for single and double density storage and providing Acorn DFS and ADFS compatibility, 16 KB of on-board sideways RAM, and a connector for a Winchester hard drive. The cartridge itself cost £59, with a bundle including a double-sided, double-density, 3½-inch drive costing £200. A 20 MB hard drive was offered at a price of £805. PAGE was set to &1900 when using the Solidisk system.

==== Advanced Plus 4 ====
Announced in early 1986, the Advanced Plus 4 (AP4) from Advanced Computer Products was a cartridge-based interface employing the WD1770 controller and featuring ACP's 1770 DFS product, providing compatibility with Acorn's DFS from the BBC Micro and thereby supporting seven-character filenames and up to 31 files per disc. However, 8 KB of on-board static RAM was used as workspace for the filing system, keeping PAGE at &E00. An extra ROM socket was provided for a user-fitted sideways ROM, and being a 1770-based interface, it was reported that Acorn's ADFS could be used instead, although since it was not aware of the additional RAM, PAGE would be raised to &1D00 as it would be when using Acorn's Plus 3. The interface was priced at £69.55 plus VAT.

==== Slogger Electron Disc System and Pegasus 400 ====
Slogger, an established producer of expansions and a reseller of other disc systems, introduced the Electron Disc System in early 1987, priced at £74.95, featuring the Cumana Floppy Disc System interface, which was combined with an Acorn-compatible DFS, SEDFS, having the capability of reading 40-track discs on 80-track drives plus support for Slogger's tape-to-disc conversion products, and reported as offering "virtual 100 per cent 8271 emulation" for compatibility with traditional DFS software. The SEDFS ROM was also available separately for existing Cumana interface owners, priced at £24.95.

The SEDFS was later bundled with Slogger's own cartridge-based interface and a 40/80-track switchable drive offering up to 400 KB storage per disc, with the bundle taking the Pegasus 400 name, introduced as part of a sales tour towards the end of 1987. This package of interface and drive cost £130. The precise DFS variant used by the Pegasus 400 system kept PAGE at &E00 and introduced "typeahead" support, permitting keystroke buffering during disc activity on systems with the Turbo-Driver or Master RAM Board fitted and enabled.

=== Slogger/Elektuur Turbo boards ===
Announced in early 1986, the Slogger Turbo-Driver was a professionally fitted upgrade priced at £42. The board itself plugged into the CPU and BASIC ROM sockets on the main circuit board of the Electron, which merely involved removing socketed components on very early Electron models, but required desoldering work and therefore benefited from a fitting service for later units. The performance benefit of fitting the board was to make some programs, particularly those running in the high bandwidth modes (0 to 3), run up to three times faster.

The direct origins of the Slogger product appear to be a board designed by Andyk Limited, announced as the Fast Electron Board in late 1985 with a price of £29.99, whereas the Elektuur modification was described in an article in Dutch Electronics magazine Elektuur and intended for users to perform at home.

The Slogger and Elektuur Turbo boards were born out of a hack initially devised at Acorn. By shadowing the lowest 8 KB of RAM with a static RAM chip outside of reach of the ULA, the CPU could always access it at 2 MHz. The tradeoff was that the screen could not be located in that 8 KB. In practice the operating system ROMs always put the screen into the top 20 KB and as a result this probably only broke compatibility with around 2% of software. Speeding up the low portion of memory is particularly useful on 6502 derived machines because that processor has a faster addressing for the first 256 bytes and so it is common for software to put any variables involved in time-critical sections of program into that region.

The cost of the 64 Kbit SRAM chip would have been more than that of doubling the four 64 Kbit DRAM chips to give 8-bit RAM access, fixing both the modest memory and poor performance issues of the Electron. Retail pricing of HM6264-15 devices, one of these being used in the expansion, was around $50 in December 1983, in comparison to around $7 for 150ns 4164 devices or $6 for 200ns 4164 devices, four of the former thereby costing around $28 in total. Thus, eight 4164 devices, at least at that time, would have cost $48-$56, whereas a combination of four 4164 devices rated at 150ns together with a static RAM device would have cost around $78.

=== Slogger Master RAM Board ===
Introduced at around the start of 1987 and priced at £64.95 fitted or £54.95 as a kit, the Master RAM Board offered the familiar turbo mode from the Slogger Turbo-Driver alongside a shadow mode providing 32 KB of static RAM in addition to the existing 32 KB dynamic RAM, thus giving 64 KB in total RAM. Through the provision of 20 KB of shadow RAM, so-called "legally written software", this being software using the operating system calls and not writing directly to the screen, could function without significant modification, making substantially more memory available for BASIC, View, Viewsheet, language ROMs and many other applications. By providing extra storage this modification also allowed some games and applications intended for the BBC Micro to function on the Electron despite the lack of a native Mode 7. The RAM provided by the Master RAM Board was also "fast RAM", accessed by the CPU at 2 MHz.

Applications could not directly address video memory in shadow mode without modification, so it was incompatible with most games, although there is no inherent reason why a game could not be written to function in shadow mode. A switch mounted through the case switched between normal, turbo and shadow modes. Despite providing an extra 32 KB, shadow mode potentially left up to 12 KB of the Electron's original dynamic RAM unused, with limited initial support provided for the use of this lower memory region. However, Slogger's modified operating system provided fundamental support for its use as a "print buffer", utilised by the company's own printer buffer software, and the programming interface concerned was elucidated in a series of magazine articles.

Towards the end of the Electron's commercial lifetime, the Turbo-Driver and Master RAM Boards were offered already fitted to new Electrons in an attempt to increase sales. For a time, Jafa Systems manufactured their own equivalent of the Master RAM Board in order to support their own product range.

=== Mode 7 display expansions ===
One of the features of the BBC Micro that was absent in the Electron was the Teletext-style Mode 7 display. The omission of this display mode was remarkable because it had a very low memory requirement (just 1000 bytes) and many BBC programs used it to maximise available memory for program code and data while also providing a colourful 40-column textual display with simple low-resolution graphical decorations.

Such display capabilities, desirable in their own right on low-memory computers, were also desirable for delivering content through low-bandwidth communications channels such as that from Teletext and Viewdata services. However, access to such services can be considered to be a separate capability, and the BBC Micro needed to be upgraded to complement its display capability with the Teletext or Prestel adapters to receive such over-the-air or online content.

Jafa Systems provided a number of solutions to remedy the absence of a Teletext display capability. Morley Electronics instead chose to offer an expansion combining the display and reception capabilities.

==== Sir Computers ====
In late 1984, Sir Computers announced a Mode 7 adapter unit that plugged into the Electron's expansion connector. Unfortunately, Sir Computers ceased trading before the product was brought to market.

==== Jafa Systems ====
Released in 1987 at a price of £89, the Mode 7 Mark 1 Display Unit was a separate unit "about the size, shape and colour of the Plus One or a Slogger ROMbox" that connected to the Electron's expansion connector and featured a Motorola 6845 display controller and Mullard SAA5050 character generator to replicate the main elements of the BBC Micro's Teletext display solution. This only used 1 KB of memory for the display, with the expansion listening to display memory write accesses and buffering the data in its own memory. (Note: Here, the MAME source code emulating the Mark 1 adapter is informative.) A ROM was included to extend the operating system to allow activation of Mode 7 as a genuine screen mode and to provide extra commands and to support keyboard shortcuts used on the BBC Micro to emit Teletext control sequences. To support the output of both the Mode 7 display and the existing video output, a lead connected the Electron's RGB output to the expansion, with the expansion providing only RF (television) output.

Conscious of the relatively high price of the Mark 1 unit, John Wike of Jafa devised and, at the end of 1988, introduced a software-based Mode 7 Simulator, priced at £25, supplied on a ROM cartridge that rendered the Mode 7 display in a low-resolution, 8-colour graphics mode. Although cheap and effective in enabling use of some software that only used official operating system routines for text output, this solution proved very slow because the Electron had to be placed into the high-bandwidth Mode 2 display to be able to show eight colours at once. In doing so, the CPU spent a lot of time drawing representations of Mode 7 characters and graphics that in a hardware solution would be achieved without any demand on the CPU. It also used up 20 KB of RAM for the graphics display rather than the 1000 bytes of a hardware Mode 7.

A conceptually similar predecessor to the software-based simulator was published by Electron User in early 1987, offering a monochrome Mode 4 simulation of the Teletext display, using the lower 25 character lines of the screen to show the Teletext output, reserving several lines at the top of the screen for a representation of Mode 7 used to prepare the eventual visual output. However, the program did not support direct access to Mode 7 memory locations. The author noted that a Mode 2 version would have been possible but would have required a redesigned character set and "too much memory".

A further refinement of the hardware solution was introduced in 1989 with the Mode 7 Mark 2 Display Unit, which retained the SAA5050 character generator but omitted the 6845 display controller, and was fitted internally in the Electron itself instead of being housed in an external unit, although some kind of ROM expansion unit was needed to hold the driver/utilities ROM. It used software to ensure that the SAA5050 was fed with the correct character data. A software ROM would put the machine into a two-colour, 40-column graphics mode (thus providing one byte per character), and as the ULA read display data from memory in the usual fashion, the SAA5050 would listen to the data it was reading and produce a Mode 7 interpretation of the same information, this being achieved by fitting a board on top of the ULA connecting to its pins. When necessary the hardware would switch between the conventional Electron graphics output and the Mode 7 output being produced by the add-on, feeding it to the Electron's built-in video output sockets via the red, green and blue lines on the motherboard.

The disadvantage to this system is that while the SAA5050 would expect to be repeatedly fed the same 40 bytes of data for every display scanline of each character row, the ULA would read a different set of 40 bytes for every display scanline in order to produce a full graphics display. A software ROM worked around this by duplicating the data intended for a Mode 7 display in memory. Although this produced a Mode 7 that had less of an impact upon CPU performance than a software solution, gave the same visual quality as the BBC Micro, and supported direct access to Mode 7 screen addresses as well as accesses via operating system routines, it still used 10 KB of memory for the display and reduced the amount of readily-usable application memory (as indicated by HIMEM) by another 6 KB.

However, with users increasingly able to rely on expansions such as the Slogger Master RAM board to provide more memory, and with this combination of expansions acknowledged throughout the user manual, the emphasis of the Mode 7 Simulator and Mark 2 Display Unit was arguably to deliver the actual display capabilities for those applications that needed them, instead of using Mode 7 as a way of economising with regard to memory usage, and to do so at a reasonable price. In this latter regard, the Mark 2 model was available as a kit costing £25 or as an assembled product (requiring some soldering) costing £49, with a fitting service available for £10.

The Jafa interfaces did not provide a Teletext or Viewdata reception capability, but the Mark 2 was explicitly stated to work in conjunction with the Morley Electronics Teletext Adapter. Meanwhile, the manual for the Mark 2 noted that the product would provide the functionality of a Viewdata terminal if combined with Jafa's RS423 cartridge.

==== Morley Electronics ====
Morley Electronics produced a Teletext Adaptor expansion for the BBC Micro and the Electron. Since the BBC Micro has the Mode 7 display capability, the model aimed at the BBC Micro merely provided the content reception capability needed to receive and decode Teletext signals, connecting to the user port and power supply. However, the Electron models provided both display and reception capabilities, doing so by routing either the RGB or UHF signals (depending on the model) through the unit in order to introduce the Mode 7 output produced by the unit, also connecting via a cartridge. The Teletext display capabilities in the Electron models exceeded those of the BBC Micro, with one reviewer noting that the enhanced capabilities permitted "black text on a coloured background, something I've always wanted to do on my Beeb". The UHF model of the Electron adapter also supported overlaying of Teletext onto video and framing of video.

=== Second Processor expansions ===
Acorn did demonstrate a prototype "Tube" interface for the Electron alongside the Plus 3 interface at the Compec exhibition in November 1984, although this was never brought to market directly by Acorn.

==== Advanced Plus 5 ====
Despite Acorn's withdrawal from the Electron peripheral market, Baildon Electronics developed the Advanced Plus 5 (AP5) expansion, featuring Tube, 1 MHz bus and user port interfaces, which plugged into a Plus 1 cartridge socket. This provided a sufficient level of compatibility that both the 6502 and Z80 second processor products from Acorn were shown to work, providing a Tube implementation that was "as faithful as you can get", with it also being noted that the Electron being available for as little as £50 at that point in its commercial lifespan was a "very cheap way of getting a CP/M machine". Some differences in the memory map of the Electron meant that BBC Micro software would need modifications to work on the Electron with AP5. The price of the unit in late 1986 was £66.70.

The additional facilities of the AP5 alongside the Tube interface permitted various expansions for the BBC Micro to be made available for the Electron. These included the Hybrid Music 5000 and the AMX Mouse.

==== PMS Electron Second Processor ====
In 1986, Permanent Memory Systems (PMS) announced a second processor product for the Electron, the PMS-E2P, as a self-contained cartridge for use with the Plus 1 containing a second 2 MHz 6502A processor plus 64 KB of RAM, priced at £89. This was based on a product originally developed by John Wike of Jafa Systems. Available as a kit or in assembled form, it could even be adapted to connect directly to the Electron's expansion connector, thus avoiding the need to even have a Plus 1 expansion, although this would require the user to find other solutions for attaching peripherals. The implementation of the interface between the Electron and second processor was said to adhere closely to Acorn's recommendations, noting that any hardware or software compatibility issues were likely to be the fault of other vendors not similarly adhering to Acorn's guidelines. PMS supplied Acorn's Hi-BASIC with the E2P, permitting the use of as much as 44 KB of the second processor's RAM with BASIC programs. The company also made a version of Computer Concepts' Wordwise Plus available for the E2P, priced at £39.95.

=== Sound system expansions ===
Despite the Electron having only limited sound generation capabilities, few expansions were offered to overcome the machine's limitations.

==== Millsgrade Voxbox ====
Advertised in late 1985, the Voxbox by Millsgrade Limited was an expansion connecting to the Electron's expansion connector that provided allophone-based speech synthesis, with driver software provided on cassette. The supplied software supported the definition of spoken words built up from the allophones – these allophones or sounds being stored in the expansion's own ROM – and for catalogues of words to be created and saved. A program was supplied that extended BASIC to allow the use of the synthesiser in user programs. The expansion used the General Instrument SP0256A-AL2 speech synthesis chip.

==== Sound Expansion cartridge ====
Originally announced in 1987 by Project Expansions to be priced at around £40, the Sound Expansion cartridge could be fitted in a Plus 1 (or compatible) slot and provide sound output equivalent to that of the BBC Micro, with Superior Software's Speech bundled as a "limited offer". A product of the same name and with similar functionality was subsequently sold by Complex Software for around £55, employing its own adjustable speaker in the cartridge unit. Superior Software had announced a version of Speech for the unexpanded Acorn Electron in 1986, but this was never released.

==== Hybrid Music 5000 ====
Hybrid Technology's Music 5000 was adapted and released by PRES for use with the 1 MHz bus of the Advanced Plus 5 expansion, with the Music 5000 itself priced at £113.85. The only functional differences between the Electron adaptation and the original BBC Micro unit involved the use of Mode 6 for the display and the reduced performance of the Electron imposing some limitations on processing in programs written for the system, although this was not thought to prevent most programs for the system from working on the Electron version.

== Legacy ==
Although the Electron presented challenges to developers in terms of the amount of memory available to programs and, particularly for those writing or porting games to the machine, a reduction in hardware features useful for controlling or presenting content on the screen, developers often discovered creative workarounds to deliver commercially successful products, making the business of writing conversions a viable one for some developers.

Several features that would later be associated with the BBC Master and Archimedes first appeared as features of Electron expansion units, including ROM cartridge slots and the Advanced Disc Filing System, a hierarchical improvement to the BBC's original Disc Filing System. Having been envisaged as the basis of a portable computer with "a very strong emphasis on communications" during its development, supporting both modem and Econet interfaces, the BT Merlin M2105 product subsequently combined the Electron with communications functionality, and the Acorn Communicator developed such concepts further, introducing networking support.

The availability of the Electron at discounted prices from 1985 onwards led to increased demand for third-party software and expansions for the machine. While it may not have been as popular as the Spectrum, Commodore 64 or Amstrad CPC, it did sell in sufficient numbers to ensure that new software titles from established producers were being produced right up until the early 1990s, with mainstream publications dedicated to the machine having effectively supported it for five years beyond the point at which Acorn's own support had ceased. One reviewer concluded that even at this point in 1990, "Electron owners wishing to upgrade their machine will find themselves better served now than at any time in the machine’s history."

== See also ==
- Electron User, the most popular Acorn Electron focused magazine
