= Zarathrusta =

1991 video game for the Amiga

- Developer: The Whiz Kidz
- Publisher: Hewson Consultants
- Programmer: Peter Verswyvelen
- Artist: Erlend Robaye
- Platform: Amiga
- Release: February 1991
- Genre: Multidirectional shooter
- Mode: Single-player

Zarathrusta is a 1991 multidirectional shooter developed by Belgian video game developer The Whiz Kidz and published by Hewson Consultants for the Amiga. Written by Peter Verswyvelen and with graphics by Erlend Robaye, the game is inspired by the 1986 video game Thrust. Their goal was to create a 16-bit version of Thrust's gameplay, with more levels, enhanced graphics and improved features. The game's name is a portmanteau between "Zarathustra" and "Thrust".

Whereas the original game Thrust used vector graphics, Zarathrusta uses bitmap graphics.

== Plot ==
The Resistance's struggle against the Empire is gaining a certain amount of success. The rebels have captured several star-cruisers and are about to launch a major offensive against the Empire, but operating these formidable ships requires a lot of energy and the Resistance lacks the necessary power sources. Several pilots have been commissioned by the Resistance to enter the Imperial bases and retrieve the "Klystron pods", an essential power source for the star-cruisers.

== Gameplay ==
An example of gameplay in Zarathrusta

The gameplay of Zarathrusta is similar to that in the original game Thrust, where the player controls a small spaceship that is constantly subject to gravity and the craft's inertia. The player has to rotate the spaceship, fire its weapons and thrust its engines to carefully navigate the planet's cavernous landscapes, retrieve the Klystron pod and escape to the orbiting mothership.

The Empire has various defence mechanisms on the surface of the planets. Some of them shoot at the player's spaceship or try to divert its course, whereas some merely block the spaceship's path. The player's craft is armed with a plasma bolt cannon which can be used to destroy some of these defence mechanisms. There's also a powerful laser scanning device which can be helpful against groups of enemies or obstacles. Rotating the ship while activating the laser will destroy any objects in the vicinity. The drawback is that using the laser consumes a lot of fuel.

If the player's spaceship is hit by enemy fire, or crashes into the terrain, it will explode. Players are given a force field to protect themselves from enemy bullets and collisions with the surrounding scenery. The force field is manually-operated and its activation requires fuel. There's also a tractor beam which can be used when hovering just above the object the player wishes to beam. The player can use the tractor beam to grab the Klystron pods, but also to absorb energy from alien inhabitants and fuel tanks which are scattered around each planet.

During the course of the game, players will encounter three different types of Klystron pods (Standard, Hydrogen and Basket), all found atop a tall plinth somewhere on the surface of the planet. Each type has its own characteristics and behaves differently as the player attempts to grab it and transport it away from the planet. Zarathrusta features 53 planets in total along with a password system allowing players to start the game from any level they want. The landscapes of the planets vary from over-vegetated jungle areas, through mechanized zones, to icy wastes. Certain planets have stronger gravitational pull while others have heavy defense systems, there are also levels where the gravity is reversed pulling the player's ship upwards.

Each planet has a reactor which provides power to its defenses. If the player shoots the reactor, the whole planet will flash and everything will be frozen until the damage can be repaired. The heavier the damage, the longer the repairs will take. If repeatedly shot, the reactor will become unstable and the player will have a limited time to escape from the planet's surface, with or without the Klystron pod. A successful escape with the Klystron pod is rewarded with 10,000 bonus points, but if the player fails to escape within the allotted time, the walls will start exploding followed by total meltdown.

== Development and release ==
Zarathrusta was created by Peter Verswyvelen and Erlend Robaye, who respectively programmed the game and created its graphics. In the December 1990 issue of The One, Hewson Consultants, Zarathrusta's publisher, stated that the pair were inspired by Jeremy Smith's 1986 video game Thrust. Robaye was a big fan of the Commodore 64 game and wanted to create a 16-bit version of it, with more levels, enhanced graphics and improved features. Robaye was very enthusiastic about the project and spent his nights after coming home from high school creating the game's graphics. Verswyvelen was convinced to start writing code for the game upon seeing Robaye's work.

Development for the game lasted 18 months and its code was written entirely in 68000 assembly. Verswyvelen had designed a level editor which allowed them to create, test and refine the game's levels in an efficient manner. As Robaye recalls, "we had a lot of fun putting levels together for each other". In the end, "I made 26 and of course Peter being Peter needed one more and made 27". Regarding the game's physics, Verswyvelen explained that, "at the time, it seemed very complicated to me, but now it all looks trivial. I was able to figure out most of the physics myself, except some parts of the rotation where I had to ask Michael Peeters, a brilliant young engineer, for help". Peeters would later hold a leading position in Alcatel-Lucent's research and development department, and Verswyvelen would teach math, physics and programming at the University of West Flanders in its game development / technical artist program.

Regarding the game's unusual name, Verswyvelen and Robaye explained that they had originally named the game Thrust and designed the title screen with that name. However, they did not hold the rights to the original game, and when Hewson acquired the game's publishing rights, they requested that the name be changed to Zarathrusta. The game was released in February 1991.

== Reception ==
Reception

Review scores
Publication	Score
ACE	700/1000
Amiga Action	68%
Amiga Format	71%
.info	4/5%
Zero	75%

ACE editor Jim Douglas praised the game's difficulty curve noting that "the difficulty of the early levels is pitched quite low, allowing the player enough time to get the grips with the control method, rather than being blasted out of the air every five seconds". He also highlighted the game's replayable nature stating that "Zarathrusta is the sort of game that you can keep coming back to – in small doses – for quite a while. Once you get to the grips with the ship control, and learnt how to negotiate the passages, it's good fun". He gave it a score of 700 out of 1000 arguing that "despite the enhanced graphics, Zarathrusta doesn't really denote much of a step forward" and "if you already possess Oids, Thrust or a similar game, it's unlikely Zarathrusta will hold many surprises".

Writing for Amiga Format, Maff Evans described the gameplay as "easy to pick up and compelling for a while". He compared the game to Thrust noting that "there has been a lot of work done on producing some nice colorful graphics and effects, but the same feel has been retained". On top of the enhanced presentation, "the extra enemies and weapons add a nice new twist", making it "a more involving blast". He gave the game a score of 71%, arguing that "one of the main points of the original was its budget price. Now five years have passed and charging a full rate for what is, in effect, a revamped budget game seems a little over the top".

Steve White of Amiga Action said that "Zarathrusta will bring tears to the eyes of seasoned gamers as they remember the good old days long ago, when they stayed up all night playing Thrust. Like Oids, from not too many moons ago, Zarathrusta draws its inspiration from this golden oldie. Keeping your craft from touching the ground while trying to maneuver inside the caverns and avoiding the enemy lasers is very hard. You will spend a lot of the time as a ball of flame. Unless you are a fan of Thrust or Oids I recommend that you try this one before you buy".

According to info, "Zarathrusta is classic European arcade fare that will keep you hunched over your joystick for weeks on end". Editor Tom Malcolm felt that the presentation was "top-notch", praising the game's sound effects and graphics, especially the backgrounds which "are animated and have that beautifully drawn, hard-edged European look". He noted that "the only real problem with the game is that learning to control your space ship is going to take some practice", explaining that "control requires a great deal of precision, so don't be discouraged if it takes a while to get the hang of it; your persistence will be amply rewarded". He awarded the game a score of 4 out of 5 describing Zarathrusta as "a very fine addition to your arcade collection".

== See also ==
- Fly Harder
- Gravitar
- Gravity Crash
- Gravity Force
- Oids
- Solar Jetman
- Sub-Terrania
- TerraFire
