= Sub-Terrania =

1994 video game

- North American cover
- Developer: Zyrinx
- Publisher: Sega
- Producer: Tony Van
- Programmers: David Guldbrandsen; Karsten L. Hvidberg; Jens Bo Albretsen; Thomas Risager
- Artists: Jesper Vorsholt Jørgensen; Mikael Balle; Karsten Lund
- Composer: Jesper Kyd
- Platform: Mega Drive/Genesis
- Release: NA: April 1994; EU: May 1994
- Genre: Multidirectional shooter
- Mode: Single-player

Sub-Terrania is a 1994 multidirectional shooter developed by Danish studio Zyrinx and published by Sega for the Mega Drive/Genesis. The game takes place in the future, where a deep-space mining colony has been invaded by an unknown alien race. The player assumes the role of a lone pilot who must defeat the alien forces and rescue the trapped miners. During the course of the game, the player controls a rotatable craft with thrusters that is constantly subject to gravity and the craft's inertia. Using the ship's "rotate-and-thrust" capabilities, the players must aim, shoot, dodge, and carefully maneuver their way through the hazardous landscape while constantly taking gravity and refueling needs into account.

It was the first game developed by Zyrinx, a small studio formed by people who had been active in the demoscene during the late 1980s and early 1990s. Upon its release, Sub-Terrania gained a reputation as an "overly difficult" game and suffered from poor sales. However, critical reception was positive with game journalists describing it as an evolution of gravity-based shoot 'em up games like Gravitar (1982) and Thrust (1986). Critics praised its originality, graphics, and soundtrack, while noting that getting used to the game's control system and physics-based gameplay can take some time.

== Plot ==
On an off-world asteroid, a red line wipes the sky as headquarters explodes. Hostile alien forces have invaded the vital subterranean mining colony. Workers are trapped in crevices and chasms, helpless against the clouds of radioactive dust swirling toward them. An experimental attack fighter is the only weapon powerful enough to repel the alien attack. A lone pilot has been charged with the task of defeating the aliens and rescuing the trapped miners.

== Gameplay ==
Fighting insects in the first level of the game

The game takes place in a side view underground environment. At all times, gravity is pulling down on the player's ship, which can work to the player's advantage to conserve fuel. The controls are similar to other gravity-based shoot 'em up games, like Gravitar and Thrust. The ship is rotated with the directional pad and the B button applies thrust in the direction it is facing. A key difference compared to other games of this type is the addition of back thrusters, which allow the players to reverse thrust as they try to dodge enemy fire and maneuver their way through the game's hazardous landscapes. Its controls can be manually configured before the game is started.

In Sub-Terrania, each level is an enclosed map in which the player is free to wander in all directions. To beat each of the game's 9 levels, the players must complete various mission objectives, which are outlined before the level begins (with the exception of the last three levels). The bulk of the missions involve rescuing trapped miners, carrying and utilizing various types of special equipment, collecting sub modules (to allow your attack ship to go underwater), and defeating alien bosses. While the players are, for the most part, free to approach things however they want, a key part of the gameplay revolves around finding efficient routes for each level.

The ship is equipped with a force field and will explode if it sustains too much enemy damage. It also has a limited supply of fuel and must be constantly recharged by collecting fuel canisters which are strategically placed throughout the levels, requiring players to plan when and where to refuel. There are various other elements that make it easier for the player to be able to finish without running out of fuel. Mining rails are suspended throughout many levels allowing players to freely slide along them while shooting. Attaching the ship on the rails turns off fuel consumption and nullifies the effects of gravity which can make for easier targeting against bosses and barriers. Scattered across the game's levels the players can find missile canisters (which equip the ship with secondary weapons), shield upgrades (which replenish the ship's force field), extra lives, and various types of special equipment. When the "Mega" bar is fully-charged, the ship can also unleash a powerful multi-directional laser blast. Once used, the bar gets depleted and begins to recharge automatically.

There are three types of weapons in the game, identified by three different colors (red, green, and blue). Each weapon type has its own upsides, downsides, and different strategies, with varying degrees of destructive power, range and a different effect on the rate of the ship's fuel-consumption. All three weapon types can be upgraded up to level 4 by collecting power-ups which cycle though red, green, and blue. The player can either take on the color of the laser they already have to increase its firepower by one level, or they can take on a different color to change the laser's attributes. When players lose a life, their weapon's power is downgraded by one level. However, this does not apply on Easy mode, in which players are allowed to retain their weapon enhancements even after losing a life.

Sub-Terrania features three difficulty modes (Easy, Normal, and Hard), all available from the start. Each difficulty mode affects the rate of fuel-consumption, the strength of the gravitational pull, the intensity of inertia, the amount of enemy damage that players can sustain, and the number of bonus points at the end of each stage. In Sub-Terrania, players earn points for shooting down enemies and are also rewarded with end-of-level bonus points based on their overall performance. This includes their remaining lives after a mission, the number of enemies destroyed, the number of POWs rescued, and their time-efficiency in completing the mission. Compared to normal mode, players get half as many points on easy and twice as many on hard.

== Development ==
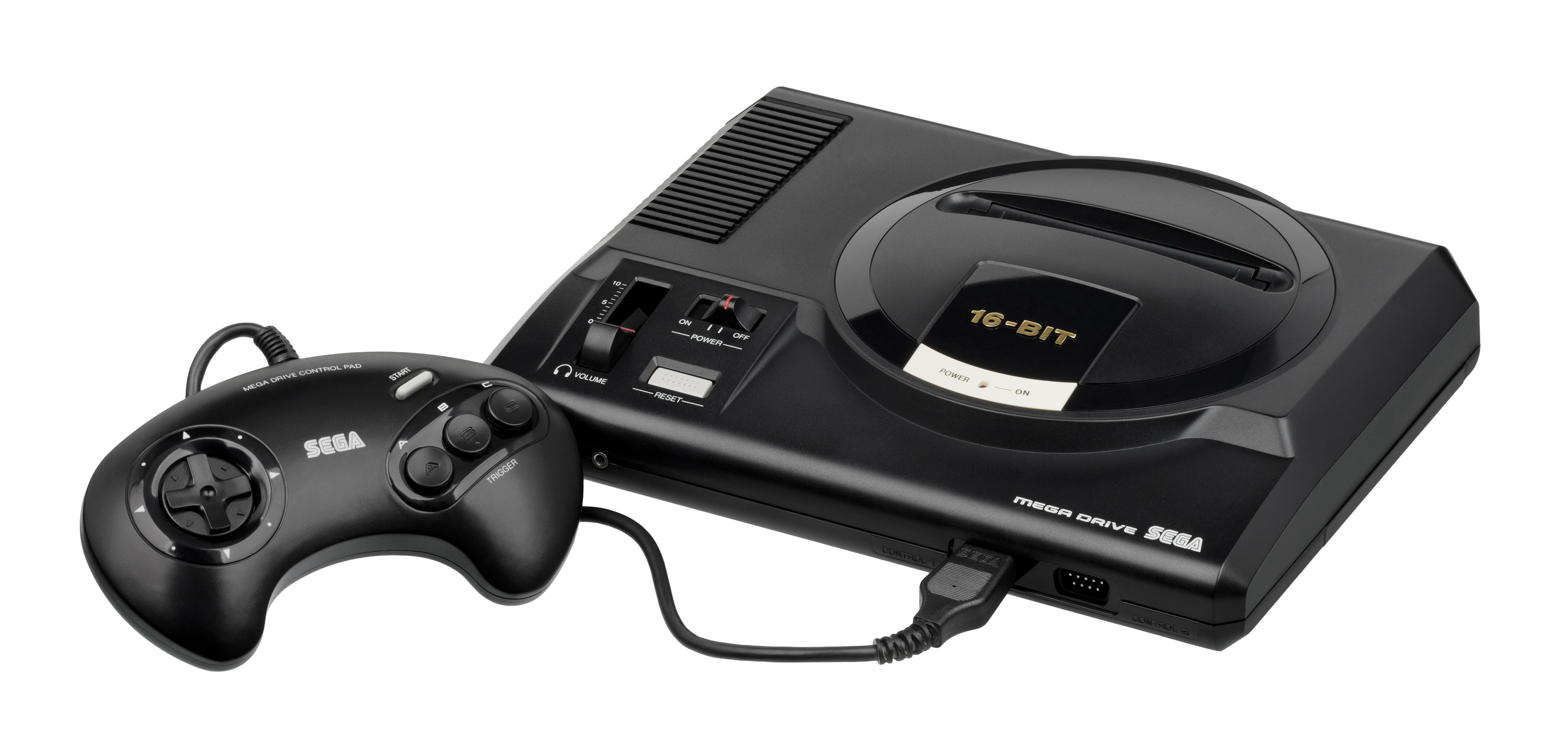
Zyrinx did not possess an official Sega development kit.

Sub-Terrania was the first game developed by Zyrinx, a small studio formed by people who had been active in the demoscene during the late 1980s and early 1990s. Most of them were prominent members of the demogroups "Crionics" and "The Silents". Their 1991 Amiga demo "Hardwired" shares many of the visual effects and styles later used in their Mega Drive games, Sub-Terrania and Red Zone.

Crionics was disbanded shortly after Hardwired was completed, with several of their members joining The Silents. However, it was not long before The Silents suffered the same fate. Most of their Swedish members decided to form DICE and work on games like Pinball Dreams and Benefactor for the Amiga. On the other hand, their Danish members – David Guldbrandsen, Karsten Hvidberg, Jens Bo Albretsen, Michael Balle, Jesper Jørgensen, and Jesper Kyd – decided to form Zyrinx and develop games for the Mega Drive, mainly because they were impressed by the amount of sprites that Sega's console was able to handle compared to the Amiga.

During the development of Sub-Terrania, Zyrinx did not possess an official Sega development kit. Instead, they hacked together their own development kit using Amiga computers. Sub-Terrania was bought and published by Sega, which gave Zyrinx enough money to relocate their offices from Copenhagen to Boston. Furthermore, the game was originally too difficult and went through two rounds of difficulty reduction before it was released. The game's soundtrack was composed by Jesper Kyd using a proprietary audio system that played music at a 44 kHz quality instead of the standard 11 kHz. The long tracks are unique, with many of them going over the five minute mark, while other tunes at time didn't cross one minute; the metallic and industrial sound-like matches with the underground style of the game. His sound driver was also used in Red Zone, The Adventures of Batman & Robin (Mega Drive/Genesis version), Pro Moves Soccer, and Ultracore.

== Release ==
Despite the game's title screen (and credits) implying a 1993 release, Sub-Terrania was released in 1994. Upon its release, it gained a reputation as an "overly difficult" game and suffered from poor sales. In a 2005 interview with Sega-16, Sega of America producer Tony Van commented on the matter, saying: "I personally could finish the game, and I'm not anywhere near as good as most gamers, so I think it got a bad rap – a few people were put off by it, and the rest just agreed without trying it. It was one of the WORST selling games Sega of America ever released, which surprised me... Gamers usually LOVE a challenge!"

In the May 1994 issue of Mega, editor Andy Dyer criticized Sega of Europe for not giving a high-quality game enough attention, stating that "not only did [Sub-Terrania] arrive pretty much totally unannounced, but Sega seemed to have a sense of complete apathy when promoting the game". On the other hand, Sega of America held a Sub-Terrania contest between April and July 1994. Participants were tasked with playing the game on the hardest difficulty setting and taking a picture of the victory screen after defeating the final boss. The prizes included: all-paid weekends in New York and Los Angeles to attend the Marvel Mega-Tour, VIP tours of the Marvel headquarters, Sega Genesis CDX systems, three games (Gunstar Heroes, Ranger X, and Thunder Force IV), limited editions comic book ashcans and Sub-Terrania hats and T-shirts.

== Reception ==
Reception

Review scores
Publication	Score
ASM	83%
Consoles +	90%
CVG	85%
Edge	90%
EGM	6/10, 8/10, 7/10, 7/10
GamePro	98%
GamesMaster	89%
Hobby Consolas	88%
Joypad	87%
Mean Machines Sega	91%
Mega	86%
MegaTech	90%
Sega Pro	88%
Sega Zone	91%

Award
Publication	Award
Mega	Top Mega Drive Games of All Time (#16)

Sub-Terrania was met with positive reviews. Graphically, the game was described as "excellent", with "nicely constructed cavern backdrops" and "stunningly smooth parallax". Many noted the game's impressive opening scene and physics, while GamePro particularly praised the fluid animation and sharp sprites. According to Edge, "some of the sprites are very impressive – especially the huge skull on level two – and no matter how much is happening onscreen, there's never any slowdown". However, some felt that there was "nothing technically ground-breaking" and that the game could have used a bit more variety in its scenery. The game's soundtrack was described as "superb", featuring a "pseudo-industrial" style and "classy tunes" "that add a heap of atmosphere". According to Mean Machines Sega, "the music is Depeche Mode, while being curiously reminiscent of classic C64 music by the likes of Martin Galway". Hardcore Gaming 101 noted that "pretty much every song in the game is in excess of five minutes long, and is great for listening to outside of the game if you're into stuff like Juno Reactor". The control system was generally praised for being "amusingly responsive" and offering "excellent handling". Edge and MegaTech noted that getting used to it can take some time, however, it "soon becomes instinctive" and the "high degree of maneuverability becomes apparent".

Edge awarded the game a 9 out of 10, concluding that "Sub-Terrania is quite simply a superbly structured and implemented piece of software: fast, clever, varied and, above all, addictive. Borrowing heavily from blasters from the past – Oids, Thrust and Lunar Rescue – it feels like a classic game yet breathes new life into the shoot 'em up genre". Similar sentiments were echoed in the review of German magazine ASM, which described Sub-Terrania as an evolution of the 1986 game Thrust, with updated presentation and "much more varied gameplay". In their review, GamePro deemed it "one of the best games of the year" and gave it a near-perfect score, citing the unique concept and outstanding graphics and animation.

French magazine Consoles+ felt that Sub-Terrania stands out compared to other shoot 'em up games, not only because of its graphics, music and presentation, but also for combining classic traits of the genre, like fast reactions, with methodical, more calculating, action. They gave the game a score of 90% describing it as one of the "most beautiful and interesting shoot 'em ups on the Mega Drive". Electronic Gaming Monthly had similar feelings about the game, calling it "one of the best" and "more original shooters on the Genesis". They also praised the graphics and soundtrack concluding that Sub-Terrania is "an exceptional game for shooter fans and non-shooter fans". However, they rated it a seven out of ten arguing that it will take players some time to get used to the gravity and that "some may find the deliberate pace maddening".

Computer and Video Games described Sub-Terrania as "a gorgeous and involving blast" in which shooting "mingles perfectly" with the gravity-based action. They gave the game a score of 85 out of 100 noting that "the inertia takes some getting used to". Mega agreed, and expanded on this by explaining that inertia is "a strange thing that, when used badly, can render a game totally unplayable, but when used well, as in the case of Sub-Terrania, simply adds yet another veneer of style and quality", arguing that "half the fun of the game is becoming an expert at combating the inertia. Not many games operate in this way, so it takes quite a time to get the hang of not stopping when you stop thrusting and having to compensate". They also praised the aspect of having to "work out your routes" and "methods of fuel conservation" for adding a methodical element and "a great deal of tension to the whole game". On a similar note, Sega Zone pointed out that "the manual dexterity of staying alive and the spacial awareness of telling left from right when you're upside down give way to tactics and strategy", describing it as "a tough and well designed learning curve". They awarded the game a 91%, saying, "this will become a classic for Mega Drive owners".

Despite giving the game a raving review, Mega expressed disappointment over Sub-Terrania having only nine levels, rating it 86%. Similarly, Mean Machines Sega and MegaTech praised every aspect of the game, but shared Mega's concerns about its longevity. According to Richard Lloyd of MegaTech, Sub-Terrania "is very tough on the hardest settings, but after playing it for only a few hours I managed to get all the way to level eight with a whole load of lives left. Because of this and the fact that the levels are exactly the same each time you play, I can't see Sub-Terrania lasting very long, which is a shame because apart from this it is an excellent blast". Mean Machines Sega gave it a score of 91% concluding that Sub-Terrania is "an addition to the list of Mega Drive classics, albeit a minor one for reasons of size". MegaTech noted that "this is no ordinary scrolling blaster. There are lots of little touches that you won't have seen before" and awarded the game a 90% describing it as a "sleek-looking", "highly original and challenging game" with "some classy tunes". Mega placed Sub-Terrania at number 16 in their Top Mega Drive Games of All Time, calling it "a superb game in almost every way".

Sub-Terrania appears in the book 1001 Video Games You Must Play Before You Die, by longtime editor of Edge magazine Tony Mott. In his retrospective take on the game, he compared it to classics like Gravitar and Thrust, stating: "Zyrinx produced one of the best examples of the genre in Sub-Terrania, a game that makes no concessions to underprepared players" and "a perfect envoy for Sega's positioning of the Mega Drive as the console of choice for the hardcore gamer".

== See also ==
- Fly Harder
- Gravitar
- Gravity Crash
- Gravity Force
- Lunar Rescue
- Oids
- Solar Jetman
- TerraFire
- Thrust
- Zarathrusta
