= Solar Jetman =

1990 video game

Solar Jetman: Hunt for the Golden Warpship
- European cover art with the subtitle misspelled as "Warship"
- Developers: Zippo Games; Rare
- Publishers: NA: Tradewest; EU: Nintendo
- Designer: Ste Pickford; John Pickford
- Artists: Lyndon Brooke; Ste Pickford
- Composer: David Wise
- Platforms: Nintendo Entertainment System, arcade
- Release: NES: NA: September 1990; EU: 26 September 1991; Arcade: NA: 1990
- Genre: Multidirectional shooter
- Mode: Single-player
- Arcade system: PlayChoice-10

Solar Jetman: Hunt for the Golden Warpship is a multidirectional shooter video game developed by Zippo Games and Rare and published by Tradewest for the Nintendo Entertainment System. It was released in North America in September 1990 and in Europe by Nintendo on 26 September 1991. The game is the third installment of the Jetman series and the sequel to Lunar Jetman (1983). was later re-released by Nintendo for their NES-based PlayChoice-10 arcade system in the United States in 1990.

In the game, series protagonist Jetman must manoeuvre his small craft through caverns of various planets whilst searching for pieces of the Golden Warpship. The game is presented in a horizontal side-view environment and has ranging gravitational pulls for each planet, which subjects Jetman's craft to various forms of inertia. Similar to its predecessors, Jetman must keep his craft topped up with fuel in order to progress through levels.

The game was developed mostly by Mancunian developer Zippo Games under the name of Iota before being ordered to change the game into a Jetman title by Rare. Ports of the game for the Amiga, Commodore 64 and Atari ST were completed but not released due to poor sales of the NES version. The game received mostly positive reviews upon release, with critics praising the game's presentation and graphics, however criticism was directed at the game's difficulty. It is included in Rare's 2015 Rare Replay compilation for Xbox One, and was re-released on the Nintendo Classics service on July 4, 2024.

== Gameplay ==
A still image of gameplay. Jetman must manoeuvre his pod through various planets with ranging gravitational pulls.

The game is a multidirectional shooter that is presented in a horizontal side-view, in a similar vein to earlier installments of the Jetman series. The game is set after the events of Lunar Jetman and involves series protagonist Jetman on his quest to gather all pieces of the Golden Warpship, a mythical starship that allows interstellar travel. The player controls Jetman's pod in either a clockwise or anti-clockwise direction. The pod is subject to inertia but not drag physics depending on the level of gravity of the set planet. The constant pull of gravity changes every level, which makes stable flight challenging and manoeuvring the pod more difficult as the levels progress.

Solar Jetman has twelve planets and one hidden planet, each with its own gravity and system of enemy-infested caverns. The goal is to navigate these caverns with small jet pods launched from an immobile mothership, on each planet bringing back a piece of the Golden Warpship and enough fuel to journey to the next one. Items are collected with a tow cable that makes flight more difficult due to the drag of the item, and are released over the mothership or deposited in small wormholes deeper in the caverns. Points are earned by retrieving valuables and destroying enemies, and can be spent after every other stage to buy power-ups for Jetman's pod. If a pod is destroyed, Jetman will eject out of the pod and walk around in an agile but vulnerable space suit. The player may be able to return to the mothership in order to collect a new pod. If the player dies outside of their pod, a life will be lost.

== Development and release ==
We wanted to make our own games. We already designed and developed Ironsword, and didn't really want to do any more of that kind of work. But if we were going to do a sequel to anything, it may have well been something we liked, and I think we liked the original Jetpac.

— Ste Pickford in a retrospective interview with Retro Gamer

Solar Jetman was developed in-joint by Mancunian developer Zippo Games and Leicestershire-based Rare. Founded by brothers Ste and John Pickford, Zippo Games was known for developing Ironsword, a sequel to Rare's 1987 game Wizards & Warriors. Impressed by the success of Ironsword, Rare purchased Zippo Games and commissioned them more development projects, a decision which was viewed unfavourably by Ste Pickford, as he wanted to focus on developing games independently. After the buy-out, the Pickford brothers started development of Iota on 1 June 1989, a game which was conceived by programmer Steve Hughes to be an arcade-shooter inspired by the Atari ST game Oids. Despite having initial creative control over Iota, Rare ordered Zippo Games to change the game into a Jetman title halfway through development.

During the late 1980s, the Stamper brothers sold the rights of Ultimate Play the Game to U.S. Gold and shifted their focus from the British home computing market to broader home console games. The company became one of the first western developers to be granted a licence by Nintendo to produce games for the Nintendo Entertainment System, during which Rare began employing more staff and expanding their operations in order to develop more games for home consoles.

After development switched to Solar Jetman, the Pickford brothers received little input from Rare, with Ste Pickford later speculating that the Stamper brothers had confidence in their abilities, despite being entrusted with their most "revered" series. In a retrospective interview, Ste Pickford stated that he drew inspiration for the mechanics of Solar Jetman from a ZX Spectrum game, Scuba Diving, admitting that the gravitational pulls of Jetman's pod were reminiscent of the way a scuba diver manoeuvred. Development of Solar Jetman lasted around a year and started from a standard two-man team to a workforce of several people as the game eventually grew larger in scale.

Shortly after release, Sales Curve Interactive announced ports of Solar Jetman for the ZX Spectrum, Commodore 64, Atari ST, and Amiga, all developed by Software Creations and published by Storm. The Commodore 64, Amiga and Atari ST versions were complete and the ZX Spectrum reached a playable demo state, before the project was cancelled due to poor sales of the NES original and perceived unsuitability for the home computer markets. The Commodore 64 version has subsequently been discovered and made available for download. Despite the cancellations, Solar Jetman was later re-released by Nintendo for their NES-based PlayChoice-10 arcade system in 1990. The game was later re-released as part of Rare's 2015 Xbox One retrospective compilation, Rare Replay, and on the Nintendo Classics service on July 4, 2024.

== Reception ==
Reception

Review scores
Publication	Score
Computer and Video Games	94%
Electronic Gaming Monthly	9/10, 8/10, 7/10, 6/10
GamePro	19/25
Mean Machines	94%
Total!	92%

The game received positive reviews from critics upon release, despite the poor sales of the NES version. Reviewers of Mean Machines praised the game's playability and gameplay, stating that it was "second-to-none" and the different gravity pulls of each planet provided "unique challenges". Richard Leadbetter of Computer and Video Games similarly praised the gameplay, comparing it to that of Thrust. Leadbetter found the gameplay challenging and stated that the addition of power-ups boosts the game's playability. Steve Jarrett of Total! asserted that the gameplay was simplistic but addictive as exploration of the game's twelve planets would "set the player at it for weeks".

The graphics and sound were also praised. Reviewers of Mean Machines stated that the graphics were "simply brilliant" and presented an "artistic accomplishment", whereas the sound was similarly "excellent". Leadbetter stated that the sound and graphics were "functional" rather than outstanding, despite stating that the graphics appeared "fast and smooth". Jarrett regarded the graphics as simple but "dead smooth" in appearance, also praising the smooth animation of the enemies and the movement of the player's ship. Jarrett also praised the sound, heralding the soundtrack as "eerie" yet "great". The game's playability and replay value were praised by a reviewer of Mean Machines, stating that the number of levels and items will last a "couple of months". Jarrett similarly stated that the game's twelve levels provide good replay value due to the game's difficulty.

== See also ==
- Fly Harder
- Gravitar
- Gravity Crash
- Gravity Force
- Oids
- Sub-Terrania
- TerraFire
- Thrust
- Zarathrusta
