= Dungeon Master: Theron's Quest =

1992 video game

- Developers: FTL Games; Software Heaven; Beam Software
- Publisher: Victor Interactive Software
- Platform: TurboGrafx CD
- Release: JP: September 18, 1992; NA: 1993
- Genre: Role-playing
- Mode: Single-player

Dungeon Master: Theron's Quest is a modified version of Dungeon Master for the TurboGrafx/PC Engine video game console. It was released on September 18, 1992 in Japan, with a North American release following the next year.

The main goal of the game is Theron finding seven parts of a blue knight's armor (Shield Defiant, Taza Poleyn, Tazahelm, Taza Boots, Taza Armor, Soulcage, The Retaliator), each of which is located in one of seven mini dungeons.

== Differences from the original ==
In the Hall of Champions

It has a different story, but can be considered as a light version of Dungeon Master. Theron's Quest doesn't contain all of the items, spells and monsters featured in Dungeon Master. Theron's Quest contains seven small dungeons instead of one big dungeon, which however are partially identical or inspired by the original dungeons of Dungeon Master and Chaos Strikes Back. As in the original, the player goes on a quest with a team of up to four champions fighting through dungeons gaining experience and finding items. In contrast to the original, the player takes the role of a character named Theron and three other champions. After successful completion of each dungeon, the whole party loses its collected items and the three champions lose their skills and statistics. Further, the game can only be saved between dungeons. The lack of the original save option during a level has been replaced by many resurrection 'Altars of VI'. There are also fewer monsters to fight which renders the game easier than the original.

== Reception ==
Upon the game's release, all but one of Electronic Gaming Monthly's four reviewers remarked that Dungeon Master, despite having aged badly over the years, remains a solid RPG. The remaining reviewer stated that dungeon crawls "just isn't my type of game." The reviewers generally praised the new CD-quality soundtrack and gave the game a score of 6.5 out of 10.
