= SunDog: Frozen Legacy =

1984 video game

- Box cover art by David R. Darrow
- Developer: FTL Games
- Publishers: FTL Games; Accolade
- Designers: Bruce Webster; Wayne Holder
- Programmers: Apple II; Bruce Webster; Atari ST; Doug Bell; Mike Newton; Andy Jaros
- Platforms: Apple II, Atari ST
- Release: 1984: Apple II; 1985: Atari ST
- Genre: Space trading
- Mode: Single-player

SunDog: Frozen Legacy is a 1984 space trading and combat simulator video game. SunDog was first developed for the Apple II, with version 1.0 being released in March 1984, and version 1.1 (bug fixes) released three weeks later. Version 2.0, which included enhancements and improved performance, was released in October, 1984. An enhanced version was released for the Atari ST in December 1985.

The first game produced by FTL Games, and the only game programmed by Bruce Webster, SunDog not only stored an impressive amount of data in the limited 64K of the Apple II, it also implemented a GUI inspired by the interface developed at Xerox PARC. Although FTL intended to release further games in the series, this was preempted by the success of their follow-up effort, Dungeon Master.

== Plot ==
The game begins with the player assuming the part of Zed, a young man who has been enslaved in the glass mines his entire life. His uncle, Brock Dor-Cede, died, leaving Zed his ship, the SunDog. Zed has the chance to earn his freedom if he can fulfil his uncle's outstanding contract to start a colony for a religious order. With little to go on, the player begins on Jondd in the SunDog.

== Gameplay ==
The player begins the game with a top-down view of a spaceship, the player's character represented by a white circle in the center. All actions are controlled by the joystick. By moving the cursor and clicking a joystick button, the player moves the character about the screen and controls all action in the game.

The game begins with the player finding the SunDog. Several components of the ship's systems need to be replaced (Apple II).

Zed, controlled by the player, finds himself aboard the SunDog. A quick inspection of the ship finds many systems damaged and several destroyed components. A quick visit to the city's Commodity Exchange finds some goods belonging to the SunDog's captain (now Zed). Zed's bank account holds a few thousand credits (money). Zed's uncle made a contract with a colony to supply them with various goods throughout their settlement. With nothing else to go on, the player must find the colony and attempt to fulfil Zed's uncle's contract.

The cities in SunDog vary in size, though all appear to be neatly laid out. They contain ship parts shops, hotels, gun shops, restaurants/bars and banks. If the player wanders about on foot for long, they will eventually encounter others. Some are beggars, some are hawkers trying to sell Zed items, but most are thugs who will attempt to mug him. The player may use Zed's weapons to fight back against muggers. With the use of bluffs or threats, some muggings can be thwarted without the use of a gun.

There is no set route the player must follow to win the game, but a typical route would have the player first finding the colony on Jondd, the planet the player starts on. The player can do this by taking the SunDog's cargo pod, which can be used like an all-terrain vehicle when detached from the ship. Exploring the continent, the player will eventually find the small colony. Driving into the colony's Commodity Exchange will display what the colony needs in order to upgrade to the next phase. Several items are listed, such as fruits/grains, stock embryos and "Sun suns." All these goods can be purchased in the commodity exchanges of cities in neighboring star systems. Some can even be purchased right on Jondd.

The only way for Zed to fulfil his uncle's contract is by supplying the colony with the items it needs. They have to buy these goods and deliver them to the colony. The colony will not give the player any money, so the only way the player can obtain the goods for the colony is by buying and selling other commodities for a profit. Zed has to adhere to the economic principle of buy low, sell high.

The player's view of the SunDog. Warping to a new system was impressive in 1984.

They have a few goods initially, but little money to buy more, especially since the SunDog needs repairs. By visiting cities' commodity exchanges, the player can inspect what is for sale, buy and sell commodities, and, ideally, turn a profit to buy everything the colony needs.

The most important goods the colony needs, however, are cryogens, or cryogenically frozen colonists. These cannot be purchased, but have to be found throughout the neighboring star systems. Zed's uncle has stored them in various commodity exchange warehouses, but has left no documentation specifying where. The only way to locate them is by visiting the planets in the neighboring systems and investigating the warehouses for any items belonging to the SunDog's captain.

The next item of business, usually, is to repair the SunDog. Normally the SunDog will be in good enough shape to fly, but it will have to be in better condition to combat and flee from the pirates which litter the merchant channels between planets. Repairing the ship is usually a straightforward affair of discarding destroyed components and replacing them with new ones obtained from parts shops found in nearly every city on every planet. The only initial problem is that some parts can be expensive, eating into Zed's initial chunk of money.

As well as keeping their ship in working order and fuelled, the player must care for Zed's health: eating food to keep hunger in check, sleeping in a safe place when tired (sleeping or collapsing from exhaustion in the open will result in being robbed) and healing if injured in personal combat.

From this point, the player can either take what commodities are waiting in the commodity exchange's warehouse, sell them or buy new commodities. The player can then travel to other systems and try to sell the goods for a profit. While there, the player can to look for any cryogens that may be stored at various commodity exchanges.

The Atari ST version has better graphics than the Apple II original.

Getting safely to other planets is another matter, however. The merchant space avenues abound with pirates eager to rob merchant vessels, like the SunDog. The SunDog's warp drive only works reliably at the edges of a star system. So the player must travel outwards, warp and then travel back in to land on a planet, giving plenty of opportunity for pirates to attack.

The player can try to either talk or threaten the pirates, but sooner or later the player will have to resort to combat. The SunDog has shields and two weapons systems (lasers and a cannon), but both have to be controlled manually. Hits from the pirates on the SunDog deplete shields and will damage systems and the hull if the shields get low. A player can destroy a pirate, survive to reach a planet, at which point the SunDog can safely land, or charge up their warp drive and warp (however warping from inside a system may fail). As a last resort the SunDog may jettison its cargo, which will make the pirates lose interest. If the player destroys a pirate, they may be able to obtain whatever cargo it was carrying. Damage to the SunDog's systems can be repaired on the fly by the player by leaving the cockpit and replacing damaged components, if they can afford the time.

The cities are neatly laid out and some are expansive. The player can traverse them by foot or, as seen here, in the ship's cargo pod.

The equipment the SunDog comes with is only suitable for landing in cities with a starport. There is generally only one city per planet equipped with one. Cryogens, however, are sometimes stored in commodity warehouses other than the one in the city the player landed in. Initially the player can use the cargo pod to pick up cryogens in other cities. However, some cryogens will be located in cities on islands or continents other than the one with the starport. The cargo pod cannot cross water, so the player has to find other means to pick up the cryogens.

The only way to do this is by outfitting the SunDog with advanced equipment. Advanced ground scanners, for example, can allow the SunDog to land in any planet's city. These advanced items have to be obtained by visiting distant planets whose shops carry these exotic parts. They can also sometimes be obtained by asking the barkeeps in bars. Other exotic items, such as "charm boosts" and "nutrapacks" can also be obtained in this manner.

== Development ==
The windowing system created for SunDog was inspired by the Xerox Alto user interface. Here in the Apple II version, two windows are superimposed on the view of a city.

SunDog was designed by Bruce Webster and Wayne Holder, who were friends from school. Webster wrote 80 to 90% of the code, serving as co-designer, chief architect, and principal developer of the game. Initially the two were making a video game version of a microgame called Star Smuggler by Dwarfstar Games, but a bankruptcy of the developer's parent company Heritage Models prevented them from getting clear rights to it. SunDog was developed as a result.

Before beginning SunDog, Webster had been working on a BBS door game called Blows Against the Empire. His idea was to lead the SunDog into some situations similar to those found in that game, and its setting was used for SunDog. Webster's Mormon faith inspired the game's story of colonists attempting to survive on the frontier.

Inspired by the Xerox Alto user interface (developed by Xerox PARC), Webster designed a layered windowing system called ZoomAction. It was hailed for its ease of use and intuitive functionality. Players only needed an Apple two-button joystick or Atari ST's two-button mouse to play the game. Windows appeared one on top of the other as the player accessed different parts of the game. Drag-and-drop icons were used for repairing the ship, buying components, eating food, and so on. The user would interact with non-player characters (NPCs) via buttons listing possible responses to what the NPC had just said.

ZoomAction was used for everything from controlling the ship to walking around the cities and planets in the game. As the user walked into buildings, a window would appear showing the interior, and the character could walk about and carry on (limited) conversations with other people in the building. The idea of exiting the ship to explore the game world remains fairly uncommon in the genre to this day. A world in which neutral characters populate interactive cities appears to be unique. Compared to games like Elite, the SunDog world was considerably more immersive, albeit much smaller in terms of the number of stars and planets.

Shortly after completing version 1.0 of SunDog, Webster and Holder demoed their game at the West Coast Computer Faire. From people playing the game, they logged about 30 bugs. Webster resolved them all within three weeks. The fixed version was released as version 1.1, and FTL provided free upgrades for all registered owners of 1.0.

Originally, SunDog was designed to run on 48K, but its memory requirement was changed to 64K late in development. Webster couldn't take full advantage of the extra memory at the time, but with 1.1 out the door, he was able to refactor the game. As a result, the new version swapped less to disk and just ran smoother. He also added some other new features. One more bug was discovered in version 1.1 (this bug actually let the player cheat, so few users complained about it). Webster fixed that bug as well. The result of this work was version 2.0 and was released in October 1984. At this point, Webster was burned out with software development and left FTL. He was made attractive offers from other game development companies, but turned them all down.

The game is written in Apple Pascal. When it was ported to the Atari ST, large sections of the Apple II version were used with little or no changes.

== Reception ==
Although the Apple II version of SunDog did not sell well despite good reviews, the Atari ST version was very successful; it was the ST's best-selling game for a year before Dungeon Master. Computer Gaming World stated of the Apple II version that "playing Sundog is so enjoyable that it's easy to forget about the mission". It praised the user interface and flexible play options, and concluded "this game sets a new standard for sophistication, complexity, and ease of play ... Sundog is everything a great game should be". In 1986 the magazine called the Atari ST version a "loving, intelligent, and detailed translation ... the most impressive game I've seen on the ST yet". Compute! in 1985 praised the Apple II version as "one of the most entertaining and absorbing role-playing games on the market today". It also praised the user interface, and approved of the game's replayability. In 1986 the magazine similarly approved of the ST version, describing it as "a first-rate graphics adventure [with] stunning graphics and easy mouse-driven controls ... the Atari ST gets a chance to show off".

Anthony Pryor reviewed SunDog: Frozen Legacy in Space Gamer/Fantasy Gamer No. 77. Pryor commented that "If you're ready to test fate, fire up your warp engines, and battle the odds for a chance at your fortune, Sundog: Frozen Legacy is a marvelous adventure."

In 1999, Ultima designer Richard Garriott declared SunDog his favorite game of all time, calling it "basically Ultima meets Wing Commander." Webster said, "after over 30 years of software engineering, SunDog is probably the project I'm still proudest (and fondest) of".

== Legacy ==
=== Planned sequel ===
The Apple II version automatically ran a demo if the user did nothing on the opening screen. It mentioned the forthcoming SunDog II. From the start, Webster planned for SunDog to be a trilogy. The two remaining entries in the series would be SunDog II: Old Scores to Settle and SunDog III: Blows Against the Empire. With the departure of Webster and FTL's much more successful Dungeon Master, SunDog II never materialized.

Webster wrote in 1985 that had he remained with FTL and developed SunDog II, he wanted to improve the NPCs' sophistication by giving them individual personalities with varied reactions to player actions. Webster stated that, for example, a greedy NPC might fight for a valuable item even if not brave.

=== SunDog: Resurrection Project ===
In the early 2000s, Webster started the "SunDog: Resurrection Project", an open-source project to recreate SunDog using modern technology. Originally he planned to have the game developed in Java because of its cross-platform capabilities, but members of the project were more comfortable with C++ and developed in that language. It had several members, but due to his commitment to his work, Webster was unable to sufficiently guide the project, which faded largely from public sight.

According to the SunDog Resurrection Project's SourceForge page as of August 4, 2007, work never ceased completely, but has continued with new and improved sprite/background graphics, as well as some game code (the game is still intended to be developed in Java), such as a functioning stock market engine. The engine reportedly has over forty stocks and tracks fourteen planetary and system variables (as opposed to the original Sundog's three) which affect market prices and stock availability with great realism and flexibility.

Some early graphics from the project were made available via the Internet on the project's public gallery, but have since been removed. Most city tiles are replicas of the Atari ST version, though there are some original graphics designed by the project artist.

The project artwork can be found on a webpage managed by Jake LaForet.

On May 21, 2012, Jake LaForet's website was revised to announce that significant work has been accomplished on the project, and that the Alpha release of the Sundog Resurrection game would be released in August, 2012. It was a closed release, so that only a small number of applicants were invited to test the Alpha version. In August, 2012, the project unveiled a new website, reportedly to serve as a platform for all future news releases and software downloads.

In February 14, 2016, the project announced they were recruiting a Beta feedback manager and would release a Beta by the end of April 2016. A Hollywood composer, H.G. Templeton, composed the game's theme song and 8000 lines of NPC dialogue had been added to the game. As of August 2018, the game was still in Beta. As of January 2020, the game is still in Beta, working through feedback from ~800 testers.
