= Dungeon Master Nexus =

1998 video game

- Developer(s): Victor Interactive Software
- Publisher(s): Victor Interactive Software
- Composer(s): Tsukasa Tawada, Hikoshi Hashimoto
- Platform(s): Sega Saturn
- Release: JP: March 26, 1998
- Genre(s): Role-playing
- Mode(s): Single player

Dungeon Master Nexus is a Dungeon Master sequel released in Japan, solely for Sega Saturn and in Japanese. It is the first game in the series using a 3D graphics engine. The game features 15 levels. Despite FTL Games being credited as the original copyright holder, they were not involved in the production whatsoever. It was entirely developed in Japan. An English fan translation patch was released in September 2023.
