= Atari Anniversary Edition =

Series of video game compilations released between 1999-2001

Atari Arcade Hits
- North American Dreamcast box art
- Developer: Digital Eclipse (Note: Additional work for the PlayStation version done by Infogrames Sheffield House.)
- Publishers: Atari Arcade Hits; Hasbro Interactive; Atari Anniversary Edition; Infogrames, Inc. (Note: The PlayStation version was released under the Atari brand name in Europe.)
- Platforms: Windows, Dreamcast, PlayStation, Game Boy Advance
- Release: Atari Arcade Hits 1: NA: July 5, 1999; Atari Arcade Hits 2: NA: 2000; Atari Anniversary Edition June 26, 2001: Windows; NA: June 26, 2001; EU: December 14, 2001; AU: February 8, 2002 Dreamcast; NA: June 26, 2001 PlayStation; NA: November 21, 2001; EU/AU: March 1, 2002 Game Boy Advance; NA: March 26, 2002; AU: April 5, 2002; EU: February 14, 2003
- Genre: Various
- Mode: Single-player

Atari Arcade Hits is a video game compilation of twelve Atari arcade games, developed by Digital Eclipse and published by Hasbro Interactive for Windows. It was originally released in two volumes, the first in July 1999, the second in 2000, respectively.

Following Hasbro Interactive's purchase by Infogrames in January 2001, the company's US publishing division Infogrames, Inc. released an updated version of the game entitled Atari Anniversary Edition in 2001, alongside ports to the Dreamcast, PlayStation (as Atari Anniversary Edition Redux) and Game Boy Advance (as Atari Anniversary Advance). However, the games and content slightly differ by platform.

== Features ==
Atari Arcade Hits 1 and Atari Arcade Hits 2 feature twelve Atari arcade games, six each, from over the years in an arcade-based setting. In addition to the games, the player can also view bonus content, with both volumes containing box art and manuals for the games included, as well as promotional material and advertisements. The first volume also contains an aftermarket level replacement hack of Tempest titled "Tempest Tubes", and several interviews with Atari founder Nolan Bushnell. Atari Anniversary Edition includes all the content from both volumes with slight updates.

The Dreamcast and PlayStation ports retain the games and bonus content from the original; although the latter version swaps out Millipede and Crystal Castles for Black Widow and Space Duel, which weren't included on the original releases. The Game Boy Advance version includes the games from the first volume, but with Pong replaced with Battlezone from the second. The bonus content included with this version includes "Tempest Tubes" and an exclusive mode called "Trivia Challenge", which consists of questions about Atari and its 1980s video games.

=== List of games ===
Games	Windows	Dreamcast	PlayStation	GBA
Asteroids (1979)	Volume 1	Yes	Yes	Yes
Asteroids Deluxe (1981)	Volume 2	Yes	Yes	No
Battlezone (1980)	Volume 2	Yes	Yes	Yes
Black Widow (1983)	No	No	Yes	No
Centipede (1981)	Volume 1	Yes	Yes	Yes
Crystal Castles (1983)	Volume 2	Yes	No	No
Gravitar (1982)	Volume 2	Yes	Yes	No
Millipede (1982)	Volume 2	Yes	No	No
Missile Command (1980)	Volume 1	Yes	Yes	Yes
Pong (1972)	Volume 1	Yes	Yes	No
Space Duel (1982)	No	No	Yes	No
Super Breakout (1978)	Volume 1	Yes	Yes	Yes
Tempest (1981)	Volume 1	Yes	Yes	Yes
Warlords (1981)	Volume 2	Yes	Yes	No

== Release ==
In 2000, Hasbro Interactive released Atari Greatest Hits, a re-release of both volumes packaged together as a 2-CD set., while Atari Anniversary Edition packages both volumes on a single disc.

== Reception ==
=== Atari Arcade Hits ===
IGN gave the first volume an 8.6/10, with the reviewer praising the emulation quality of the games and bonus content.

=== Atari Anniversary Edition ===
Reception

Aggregate score
Aggregator	Score			
Aggregator	Dreamcast	GBA	PC	PS
Metacritic	60/100	75/100	74/100	72/100

The Atari Anniversary Edition version of the game received "mixed or average" reviews, while Atari Anniversary Advance received "generally favorable" reviews, according to the review aggregation website Metacritic.
