= FTL Games =

American video game developer (1982–1996)

- Type: Subsidiary
- Industry: Video games
- Founded: 1982
- Founder: Wayne Holder
- Defunct: 1996
- Headquarters: San Diego, California, U.S.
- Area served: Worldwide
- Key people: Wayne Holder; Bruce Webster; Doug Bell
- Products: SunDog; Oids; Dungeon Master series
- Parent: Software Heaven Inc.
- Website: ftlgames.com (offline, existed in the mid 90s)

FTL Games (Faster Than Light) was the video game development division of Software Heaven Inc. FTL created several popular video games in the 1980s. Despite the company's small size, FTL products were successful and received positive reviews from critics.

== Overview ==
FTL was founded by Wayne Holder in 1982. Holder started Software Heaven and FTL as its game division after founding Oasis Systems, which specialized in spell checking software. He hired Bruce Webster, with whom he graduated from high school, to head FTL. After Webster left FTL in 1984, Doug Bell joined FTL and served as the Technical Director until FTL ceased operations in 1996.

== Release history ==
FTL released several games throughout its short history. Certain titles were best sellers for the time of their release.

=== SunDog: Frozen Legacy ===
Holder and Webster co-designed FTL's first game, SunDog: Frozen Legacy, a space trading game. It was released first for the Apple II in March 1984. Webster did most of the programming for the Apple II version, but resigned from FTL after the release of version 2.0. Doug Bell, Andy Jaros and Michael Newton significantly enhanced the game's graphics when porting the game to the Atari ST, releasing it in late 1985. SunDog became the best selling game on the Atari ST during the system's first year, and garnered lavish critical acclaim.

The packaging cover art was designed and illustrated by David R. Darrow.

=== Oids ===
Oids, an action game, was one of FTL's minor releases. The original Atari ST version was created by Dan Hewitt who did both the graphics and all of the programming. It received little attention with a later conversion to the Mac, but received 5 Stars on Macworld 1990. However the original Atari ST release received rave reviews in the UK, where it remains a cult favourite. Later, after FTL ceased operations, an updated authorized shareware version of Oids for the Macintosh was developed and released by Kirk Baker. It was however eclipsed by the release of FTL's next game.

As with SunDog, the packaging cover art was designed and illustrated by David R. Darrow.

=== Dungeon Master ===
Dungeon Master is a fantasy role-playing game, which popularized real-time gameplay. The game included a number of user interface features that made gameplay particularly enjoyable, from a spell system that seemed to be "logical" to the intuitive way the player used the mouse to directly manipulate items in the simulated 3D view. It was released on the ST in 1987 and went on to become the ST's best-selling product of all time. It was eventually ported to over a dozen platforms in six languages. It received many awards, including the first Special Award for Artistic Achievement from Computer Gaming World when it was initially released.

David R. Darrow returned to illustrate the cover artwork for Dungeon Master.

=== Chaos Strikes Back ===
A Dungeon Master sequel, Chaos Strikes Back, was released in 1989 for most platforms, but notably excluding a PC version. It uses the same engine as Dungeon Master but features new creatures and graphics.

=== Dungeon Master: Theron's Quest ===
Dungeon Master: Theron's Quest was a simplified Dungeon Master version with new dungeons from 1992 for TurboGrafx-16 and the PC Engine.

=== Dungeon Master II ===
Dungeon Master II: The Legend of Skullkeep was the best-selling game of the week when it was released in Japan in December 1993. For some reason, it took two years before it was released in the US and Europe in 1995 by Interplay Productions. While the game had been highly anticipated, by 1995 it was considered too dated and sold poorly. The studio began to break up around this time.

=== Dungeon Master Nexus ===
Dungeon Master Nexus was released 1998 for Sega Saturn and only the Japanese market under the FTL and Software Heaven brand. It was developed and published by Victor Interactive Software.
