= Dungeon Master II: The Legend of Skullkeep =

1993 video game

- Developer: FTL Games
- Publisher: Interplay Productions
- Director: Doug Bell
- Composers: Allister Brimble; Rick Jackson; Brian Luzietti
- Platforms: PC-98, FM Towns, Sega CD, Amiga, MS-DOS, Classic Mac OS
- Release: December 23, 1993 (PC-9801); January 28, 1994 (FM Towns); March 25, 1994 (Mega CD Japan); September 22, 1994 (PC-9821, DOS/V, Mac Japanese); August 16, 1995 (MS-DOS); 1995 (Amiga, Mac English)
- Genre: Role-playing
- Mode: Single-player

Dungeon Master II: The Legend of Skullkeep, also released as Dungeon Master II: Skullkeep, is the sequel to the dungeon crawler role-playing video game Dungeon Master. It was released in 1993 in Japan and in 1995 in other countries. It is available for MS-DOS, Amiga, Mac, Sega CD, PC-9801, PC-9821, DOS/V, and FM Towns.

== Development ==
FTL's Wayne Holder said in 1994 that FTL considered a free-movement engine like Doom or Ultima Underworld for Dungeon Master II ("it's not that hard to do"), but "we prefer puzzle-oriented game design", while free-movement was "tedious to play" and complicated puzzle design.

== Ports ==
MS-DOS screenshot

There are many graphical differences between the MS-DOS and Amiga versions. For example, the title and endgame animations are very different. Items graphics also change: the Amiga version, while marked as an AGA game, is actually running in 32 color ECS mode (evident by the fact that it runs on Amiga 600 computers with 2MB RAM) colors, whereas the MS-DOS version has 256 color VGA graphics. While the PC-9821 has 256 color graphics, the PC-9801 version uses dithered graphics to fit within the PC-9801's palette.

The Mac version includes two screen layouts: a normal and a compact layout.

The game music is different in each version of the game: the PC version uses MIDI music (which therefore sounds different on different sound cards), the Amiga version uses MODules, and the Sega CD version uses CD Audio tracks.

== Reception ==
Reception

Review scores
Publication	Score
Next Generation	2/5
PC Gamer (US)	65%
PC Zone	59% (DOS)
PC Games	B
The One	93%
Computer Game Review	63/42/56

Dungeon Master II received mediocre reviews and sold poorly. Reviewing the Sega CD version, GamePro commented that the standard Genesis controller does not work well with its point-and-click interface, and that a Sega Mouse is needed to fully enjoy the game. They also criticized the need to maintain light sources and food supplies.

However, the bulk of their review was devoted to praise for the enemy AI, which they contended is so intelligent and naturalistic that it's "almost like playing against another person." Reviewing the later PC version, a Next Generation critic said that while the original Dungeon Master was an outstanding game, Dungeon Master II retained aspects of the original that had long since become outdated. Noting the "refreshingly different magic system" as one of the few bright points, he gave it two out of five stars.

The One gave the Amiga version an overall score of 93%, praising the game's atmosphere and 3D sound effects. The magazine criticized FTL's attempt to add smoother movement, stating that "it simply isn't as good as any of the Doom clones that there are around at the moment". Noting that Dungeon Master II was a much deeper game than the Doom clones, however, The One concluded that Dungeon Master II was "an excellent game well worthy of its high scores".
