= Purser's Magazine =

Computer magazine

Purser's Magazine was a computer magazine by Robert Elliott Purser and edited by Mary Ann Dobson.

== Contents ==
Purser's Magazine was a magazine which contained introductory-level articles written about computers as well as reviews of software.

== Reception ==
Bruce F. Webster reviewed Purser's Magazine in The Space Gamer No. 44. Webster commented that "I recommend this magazine with the following conditions: (1) you own a TRS-90 Model III or an Apple II; (2) you don't know much about computers; (3) you want descriptions of much of the currently popular software. Don't buy it expecting well-thought-out reviews."
