= Gravity Force =

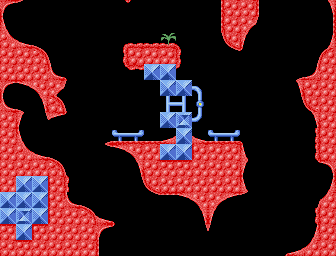
- Screenshot of Gravity Force 2
- Genre: Multidirectional shooter
- Developers: Kingsoft GmbH (original); Jens Andersson and Jan Kronquist (sequels)
- Publishers: Kingsoft GmbH; Amiga Power
- Platforms: Amiga (all in series); Atari ST, DOS (original only)

Gravity Force is a video game series for the Amiga. The first game in the series was published commercially by Kingsoft GmbH in 1989, as a Thrust-clone. The aim is to pilot a spacecraft through caverns avoiding enemy fire. The ship is subject to gravity and inertia and colliding with terrain or the walls of the cave results in destruction of the ship.

== Gravity Force 2, Gravity Power and Gravity Addict ==
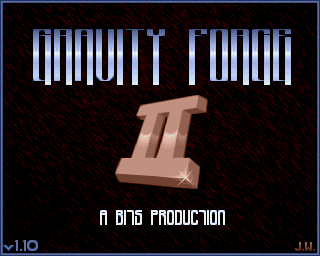
GF2 logo

In 1994, fans Jens Andersson and Jan Kronquist obtained permission from creator Stephen Wenzler at Kingsoft to release a sequel, Gravity Force 2. They collaborated on the graphics with Christer Masmanidis, Niklas Ivarsson, and Jan Warner (of Amiga demoscene group Nexus). The game was released onto the Blekinge Institute of Technology's student BBS, hosted at the Soft Center business park in Ronneby. The game was re-distributed to the Datormagazin BBS, and at this point the creators published an update making the game shareware. Subsequent contributions from fans include a level editor by Richard Franks, and many unofficial levels.

As a complete rewrite, sharing no code with the Kingsoft original, Gravity Force 2 added destroyable walls, single player missions and a 2-player multiplayer mode, both split-screen and over a null modem cable. Sound effects were homemade recordings such as hitting a cord against a radiator and dropping fruit into water.

In 1994, Gravity Force 2 attracted the attention of British computer game magazine Amiga Power, who released it on the coverdisk of issue 39, and the following year ranked it the second best Amiga game of all time (behind Sensible Soccer). Their endorsement continued in 1995 through the commissioning of Gravity Power, a slightly enhanced version which was published on the coverdisk of issue 50. Amiga Power had asked for a 4-player mode, but this did not make it into the final version as it would have required substantial rework to the codebase.

The latest official version in the series was released in March 2026, entitled Gravity Addict. This was produced with help from Galahad for Amiga Addict magazine and adds a new intro titlescreen, new menus and text, plus many additional game levels to play.

== Reception ==
The original Gravity Force was reviewed in 1989 by German game magazine ASM, receiving 75/100 points, and by Power Play in the same year, receiving 72/100.

In 1995, Amiga Format praised Gravity Force 2, identifying the non-commercial nature of the game as a critical factor in its success, as he noted that the programmers did not succumb to the creative restraints from publishers and deadlines.

In 2011, Gravity Power was named one of the 1001 Video Games You Must Play Before You Die. In 2016, the book Swedish video game development from the 50s to the 90s was published, featuring an interview with Andersson and Kronquist, and in 2017 another interview featured in the book Generation 500, in which the game was described as "one of the Amiga platform's most loved titles".

== Legacy ==
A planned sequel to Gravity Force 2, to be called gf2k was abandoned at an early stage in 2001. The developers did eventually release a multi-platform sequel in 2015 named Gravity Force 20, built using the Unity engine.

In September 2008, the developers of Gravity Force 2 released the Amiga Motorola 680x0 assembly language source code for "nostalgic interest" without specified license. In April 2017 the authors clarified the game and source code license as CC BY-SA 4.0.

Many similarly titled clones have since appeared. These games are generally freeware and position themselves as direct descendants of Gravity Force and Gravity Power rather than Thrust.

== See also ==
- Gravitar (1982)
- Space Taxi (1984)
- Thrust (1986)
- XPilot (1992)
