= Black Widow (video game) =

1983 video game

- Manual cover
- Developer: Atari, Inc.
- Publishers: Atari, Inc.
- Designer: Bruce Merritt
- Programmer: Bruce Merritt
- Platform: Arcade
- Release: NA: February 1983
- Genre: Twin-stick shooter
- Mode: Single-player

Black Widow is a 1983 twin-stick shooter developed and published by Atari, Inc. as an arcade video game. The player controls a black widow spider using one joystick to move and one to fire, defending the web from insects.

Black Widow was offered as a conversion kit for Gravitar (1982), with both games using vector monitors. The kit uses the original Gravitar PCB with a few modifications and a new set of ROM chips.

== Gameplay ==
Gameplay

To destroy certain enemies, the player must lure other enemies into destroying them. The Bug Slayer is a bug that helps the player eliminate enemies, with loss of potential points being the only consequence. The Bug Slayer can help the player in tough situations, but can also prevent the player from achieving the number of extra lives necessary to endure later, more difficult, rounds.

Other enemies appear on the playing field as eggs, laid by other enemies. The player can move these eggs off the playing field to both eliminate the enemy and receive points, before they reach maturity.

=== Enemies and scoring ===
- Mosquito - if shot, becomes '$'.
- Beetle - eats '$', but if shot, becomes '$'.
- Hornet - lays an egg on '$', but if shot, becomes '$'.
- Egg - grows to become hornet or spoiler. Must be pushed off the web to score 500, 1000, 1500, 2000, or even 2500 points.
- Grub Steak - tag for 500, 250, 100, or 50 points—the sooner the better.
- Spoiler - invulnerable, can only be destroyed by a grenade bug, bug slayer or rocket bug.
- Grenade Bug - explodes if shot. Bugs and eggs within the kill zone score 500 points each.
- Rocket Bug - invulnerable. Launches "rockettes" at black widow from the other bugs it tags. Shoot rockettes to score 1000 points each.
- Thunderbug - if shot, it breaks formation and attacks. If shot again, it explodes all other T-bugs for 5000 points. Keep away from all T-bugs to earn 10000 points. The resulting chain reaction from multiple thunderbugs is very dangerous and can encompass over 80% of the level at some times, depending on how many T-bugs are involved.
- Bug Slayer - harmless to the player and invulnerable. The Bug Slayer competes with the Black Widow for food. Beat it to its flashing prey for points.

== Reception ==
Black Widow topped the US RePlay arcade chart for software conversion kits in May 1983.

== Legacy ==
Black Widow was included in Atari Anniversary Edition Redux for the PlayStation in 2001. In 2003, it was included in Atari - 80 Classic Games in One! for Microsoft Windows. In 2004, it was included in Atari Anthology for PlayStation 2 and Xbox, and in 2005, it was included in Atari Masterpieces Volume 1 for the N-Gage. In 2022, it was included in Atari 50.

James Vollandt holds the official record for this game, with a maximum 930,100 points.

A remake, Black Widow: Recharged, was released for multiple systems, including the Atari VCS (2021 console) and Windows, in October 2021.
