= Doug Bell (game designer) =

American video game developer

Douglas Andrew Bell
- Born: February 24, 1961 (age 65)
- Education: University of California, Irvine
- Occupations: Video game designer Game programmer
- Known for: Dungeon Master

Douglas Andrew Bell (born February 24, 1961) is a video game developer, best known for his role as the designer and programmer for the Dungeon Master series from San Diego studio FTL Games.

== Career ==
Doug Bell worked as director, lead designer and developer for Dungeon Master. But before he joined in 1983 FTL Games, the game was titled Crystal Dragon, and developed together with Andy Jaros (Artwork) in their development studio PVC Dragon for the 8-bit Apple II computer.

After a merger, the game was rescheduled to be launched after the release, and for the target platform of the 16-bit Atari ST computer, which offered more possibilities. Bell was the lead developer and technical director of FTL from 1986 until 1995, the company ceased operations in 1996.

== Credits ==
=== Games ===
- Lead programmer for the Atari ST version of SunDog: Frozen Legacy (1985)
- Lead developer of Dungeon Master (1987) (also did the X68000 port of Dungeon Master)
- Project manager and developer for Chaos Strikes Back (1989)
- Lead developer for Dungeon Master II: The Legend of Skullkeep (1993)
- Trion Network Platform for the Defiance (Trion, 2013)

=== Other commercial software ===
- Research Assistant module for the Encyclopædia Britannica CD (2000, 2001)
