= Space Duel =

1982 video game

- North American arcade flyer
- Developer: Atari, Inc.
- Publishers: Atari, Inc.
- Platforms: Arcade, Atari 7800
- Release: Arcade: NA: February 1982; 7800: WW: November 29, 2024
- Genre: Multidirectional shooter
- Modes: Single-player, multiplayer

Space Duel is a 1982 multidirectional shooter video game developed and published by Atari, Inc. for arcades. It is a direct descendant of the original Asteroids, with asteroids replaced by colorful geometric shapes like cubes, diamonds, and spinning pinwheels. Space Duel is the first and only multiplayer vector game by Atari. When Asteroids Deluxe did not sell well, this game was taken off the shelf and released to moderate success.

== Gameplay ==
Gameplay screenshot in single-player mode with two ships connected together

The player has five buttons: two to rotate the ship left or right, one to shoot, one to activate the thruster, and one for force field. Shooting all objects on the screen completes a level. Space Duel, Asteroids, Asteroids Deluxe, and Gravitar all use similar 5-button control system.

A key concept of the game was that there were two player ships, not one. At game start, the players could decide whether to play in normal fashion with the one (single player) or two (two player) ships acting independently, or in a second mode where the two were connected together. In the connected mode, one ship firing its thrusters would cause the other to be pulled along, and then continue moving when the thrust was stopped, resulting in them rotating around each other. This mode was mostly used in single-player, as it put two ships on the screen and produced two shots. The downside to the connected mode was that if one of the two ships was hit, there was the possibility that the connection between them would burn like a fuze and destroy the second ship a short time later. This did not happen every time, so in other cases it allowed the remaining ship to fight on.

== Legacy ==
Space Duel is included within the Atari Anthology compilation for Windows, Xbox, and PlayStation 2, as well as on the PlayStation version of Atari Anniversary Edition. A port of Space Duel was released on the Atari Flashback 2 console, reproducing only the single-player mode.

A Space Duel cabinet is pictured on the cover of The Who's 1982 album It's Hard.

In 2024, Atari re-released Robert DeCrescenzo's homebrew port of Space Duel for the Atari 7800, as well as for the Atari 2600+ and 7800+ consoles.

=== High scores ===
David Plummer holds the official world record for 1 single player, single ship version, with 623,720 points.

Sam McNear holds the official world record for 1 single player, double ship style version, with 403,610 points.

John McAllister and Sam McNear hold the official world record for double players, double ship style version, with 309,290 points.
