= Kingsoft GmbH =

German video game company

- Type: Subsidiary
- Industry: Video games
- Founded: 1982; 44 years ago in Mulartshütte, Roetgen, West Germany
- Founder: Fritz Schäfer
- Defunct: 1995
- Fate: Dissolved
- Headquarters: Aachen, Germany
- Area served: Germany
- Key people: Fritz Schäfer (managing director; 1982–1995)
- Number of employees: 20 (1994)
- Parent: Electronic Arts GmbH (1995)

Kingsoft GmbH was a German video game company based in Aachen. The company was founded in 1982 by Fritz Schäfer out of his parents' house in Mulartshütte (Roetgen) to sell his chess simulation game Boss (later renamed Grandmaster), which he developed the year before. Kingsoft expanded into third-party publishing in 1983, starting with Galaxy by Henrik Wening. Most of their games were released for computers developed by Commodore International, predominantly the Commodore 64, Commodore 16 and later Amiga, and were usually based on other company's titles for different platforms. Kingsoft moved to Aachen in 1987 and established a distribution service before ceasing publishing in favour of distribution in 1993. The company was acquired in March 1995 by Electronic Arts, who retired the Kingsoft name later that year.

== History ==
=== Background and foundation (1978–1982) ===
Before founding Kingsoft, Fritz Schäfer was studying electrical engineering at RWTH Aachen University, where he learned to program in the Fortran programming language. Simultaneously, he worked a day job for a McDonald's restaurant also located in Aachen. Using his salary, Schäfer acquired a used Commodore PET 2001 computer for a low price in 1978. Initially, he considered reselling the computer but stuck with it when he started creating small video games made in the BASIC programming language, and later taught himself to program in the assembler language. In the early 1980s, chess computers had become popular in Germany, with such device being sold for prices ranging between several hundred and over 1,000 Deutsche Mark (DM). Schäfer, himself also a fan of chess, considered this market an opportunity to turn his PET into a chess computer through custom software. Therefore, he, together with a friend who also owned a PET 2001, created the chess game Boss. The game's development was originally meant to be a hobbyist project. This changed when, in 1981, Commodore International released the VIC-20, a new computer that used the same processor as the PET (the MOS Technology 6502) but was additionally fitted with a video chip capable of presenting high-resolution colour graphics. Commodore International had released several software modules for the VIC-20, none of which covered a chess programme, wherefore Schäfer decided to create a VIC-20 conversion of Boss, which he would try to sell. To do so, Schäfer founded Kingsoft GmbH in 1982 from his parents' house in Mulartshütte, a district of Aachen's Roetgen suburb.

Kingsoft established a direct-to-customer distribution system, using Boss at 900 DM, as their first commercial product. A small advertisement was placed in the German Chip computer trade magazine. Schäfer's mother handled customers ordering by phone, while a database was improvised using notes in a shoe cabinet. Orders were processed as either a cassette or a floppy disk and shipped by post. Sales for Boss quickly gained traction and attracted a wide variety of customers, including computer scientist Konrad Zuse. Parallelly to Kingsoft, Schäfer did minor external work for Düsseldorf-based software company Vobis, where he had a connection to his former shift supervisor from McDonald's, including the translation of computer manuals into English and representing the company on fairs. At on one of such fairs, the 1982 Hobbytronic in Stuttgart, Schäfer spotted German chess grandmaster Theo Schuster duelling multiple chess computers simultaneously. After being convinced by Vobis founder Theo Lieven, Schäfer asked the organisers of the event if Boss was allowed to co-compete against Schuster; as the organisers agreed, Schäfer quickly set up a VIC-20 running the game. Schuster took the chess computers seriously and was able to beat them with ease, but used a more foolhardy approach with Boss, which led him to almost losing the game and therefore calling for a draw. The result proved as a success for Boss and would subsequently be used heavily in the game's advertising.

=== Expansion into third-party publishing (1983–1986) ===
Following its success on the PET and VIC-20, Boss was also being ported to the Commodore 64 (C64). Meanwhile, Schäfer was discussing the possible international distribution of the game with British distribution partners, who stated that the name "Boss" was negatively connoted in the English language. Subsequently, Boss was renamed Grandmaster (alternatively spelt Grand Master) and started being licensed and sold internationally. In the UK, the game was released by Audiogenic. These deals served as the base for Kingsoft's success as a publisher; in 1983, the company published their first third-party-developed game, Galaxy, a clone of Galaga designed by Henrik Wening. Kingsoft inserted advertisements reading "Programmierer gesucht" ("Programmer(s) wanted") in German computer trade magazines, including Chip, to attract game submissions, as a result of which the company became a primary focal point for German game developers. As Kingsoft did not have any internal development team, they worked exclusively with third-party developers. The company picked promising titles from the many titles it received and bought the rights for these games in four- to five-digit transactions. Distribution of Kingsoft games within Germany was handled by Kingsoft themselves, with Anirog distributing the games in Great Britain. In 1984, Kingsoft released two further games developed by Wening: Zaga, based on Zaxxon, and Space-Pilot, based on Time Pilot. Space-Pilot was received well by the British audience, and was followed onto with a less successful sequel, Space-Pilot 2, the following year. The company also published platform game Tom, sports game Winter-Olympiade (known as Winter Events in the UK) and its sequel, Sommer-Olympiade (known as Summer Events in the UK), all of them designed by Udo Gertz.

Commodore International released the lower-budget Commodore 16 (C16) in 1985 to a low sales performance. At the time, Commodore International was the jersey sponsor for German football club FC Bayern Munich, wherefore Uli Hoeneß, the club's manager, arranged a deal with discounter chain Aldi in 1986 to have C16s distributed through their stores. To ensure the computers' salability, pamphlets with information about software and accessories for the computers were to be added to them. Because publishers of C16 games were rare in Germany and because Schäfer had been in contact with the manager of the German branch of Commodore International, Kingsoft was contracted to create these pamphlets. Kingsoft ported several of its games to the platform, including Grandmaster, Galaxy, Tom and Ghost Town, which were bundled as the Plus Paket 16 ("Plus Package 16") and sold for DM 39. Schäfer also authored a book titled Das große C-16-Buch ("The Great C-16 Book"). The C16s were then bundled with data disks and advertised as a training computer for BASIC. Roughly 200,000 computers were sold in this manner.

=== Move into distribution and acquisition (1987–1995) ===
Following onto their success with C16 game sales, in 1987, Kingsoft moved from Schäfer's parents' house to proper offices in Aachen, including a warehouse space. From the new offices, Kingsoft established bespoke distribution services, with which it would deliver to chains like Allkauf, Toys "R" Us and Vobis. This service, as well as a raised rent for the new location and higher wages for the company's staff, put Kingsoft in a financially critical state, only recovering out of the need to stay independent. During this time, C16 sales were drawing to a close, and Kingsoft became more involved with games for Amiga computers by 1988. Unlike other Amiga game publishers at the time, Kingsoft offered games for a price lower than the widely asked-for DM 80. Their first successful Amiga game was the pinball game Pinball Wizard, other significant titles include Emerald Mine (1987) and its sequel, Emerald Mine II, designed by Volker Wertich; 1991's Hägar der Schreckliche, the company's only licensed game; and the 1992 game Locomotion. Other Kingsoft games for Amiga include Excalibur, Corpio, and Cybernauts. Around this time, the company expanded to 12–13 employees (including six full-time employees) and had hired Marc Oberhäuser as an accounting manager. Due to game development becoming more expensive and requiring larger teams, the company hired Norbert Beckers as development director.

In 1993, Kingsoft ceased operations as a game publisher and shifted its focused to only distributing games. Parallelly, Schäfer established Ikarion Software GmbH as a separate video game developer. As a distribution-focused company, Kingsoft became a viable acquisition target for companies seeking to distribute their games in Germany. 1994 marked Kingsoft's last year as an independent company; that year, the company employed 20 staff members and generated revenues of DM 20 million. On 8 March 1995, American game company Electronic Arts (EA) announced that they had acquired Kingsoft for an undisclosed sum. Kingsoft became a subsidiary and the distribution centrefold of EA's existing operations in Germany, Electronic Arts GmbH, and would serve as EA's connection to German retailers and local marketplaces. Other parties interested in purchasing Kingsoft included Rushware and MicroProse. EA soon retired the Kingsoft brand and Schäfer left the company to focus on Ikarion. He then left Ikarion in 1998, which shut down in 2001.

Sometime later, Schäfer briefly attempted to revive the Kingsoft name for Busy Bags, a casual game he was developing for the Android and iOS smartphone operating systems, but found that nobody at EA was willing to provide him with a definite answer regarding the rights to the name. Schäfer instead settled for the company name "Shepps", a portmanteau of "Shepard" and "Apps", to release Busy Bags and future games.
