= Chaos Strikes Back =

1989 video game

- Cover art by David R. Darrow
- Developer: FTL Games
- Publisher: FTL Games
- Designers: Doug Bell; Joe Linhoff; Mike Newton
- Artists: Andrew Jaros; David L. Simon
- Writer: Nancy Holder
- Platforms: Atari ST, Amiga, FM Towns, PC-98, X68000
- Release: 1989 (Atari ST); 1990 (ports)
- Genre: Role-playing
- Mode: Single-player

Chaos Strikes Back is an expansion and sequel to Dungeon Master, the earlier 3D role-playing video game. Chaos Strikes Back was released in 1989 and is also available on several platforms (including Atari ST, Amiga, X68000, PC-98, FM Towns). It uses the same engine as Dungeon Master, with new graphics and a new, far more challenging, dungeon.

== Development ==
Wayne Holder of FTL said in 1994 that Chaos Strikes Back was developed after the success of the first game, and reused its look and style. He said "I wish we'd done the whole thing differently ... some people were expecting more. It certainly wasn't in the same class as Dungeon Master".

== Gameplay ==
Demons on the FULYA Pit level.

Although Chaos Strikes Back describes itself as an expansion pack, the original Dungeon Master is not required. Whereas the first game saw the player following a fairly linear path through the adventure, with the completion of each flat level marked by a staircase leading down onto a new slightly harder level below, Chaos Strikes Back features a choice of paths which twist back and forth over all levels. The puzzles are far more convoluted, often demanding quick mastery of the control system to deal with intense combat, along with brain vexing riddles and room layouts.

The game is therefore pitched at a much higher difficulty level than its predecessor. The player can choose from a selection of moderately high-level characters or can import characters from a Dungeon Master saved game. In an indication of the game's uncompromising toughness, the player's very first task is to get out of a dark, enclosed room filled with ferociously toothed man-eating giant worms. The game is made a little easier by the inclusion of a separate program which dispenses cryptic hints based on the player's current saved game. Another new, useful feature is an ingame real time map of the dungeon, which makes use of the GOR magic glyph (It had no use in the first game though it's said it was used to create FUL bomb attack potions, which wasn't kept as a spell for the released game) The original had countless guides but the much harder sequel did not, perhaps due to the game itself having an inbuilt map as well as the 'oracle' hint feature, even so though a shorter game it is a lot harder.

The player's task is to collect four pieces of corbum, a magical material from which the eponymous Lord Chaos draws his power. This requires the traversing of four separate paths each leading to a piece of corbamite and each themed around one of the disciplines open to characters in the game. These disciplines are fighter, wizard, priest and ninja.

=== Champion Editor ===
Custom characters represented in the Champion Editor (Amiga version)

Chaos Strikes Back comes with a utility for editing the portraits and names of the four-character party. This utility allows custom character portraits to be created for both Chaos Strikes Back and for Dungeon Master.

For users who do not want to draw new characters, but who would like more powerful looking versions of the existing characters (to better represent the higher levels), the game's utility disk also comes with "enhanced" versions of the game's prepackaged character art.

== Reception ==
Computer Gaming World stated that "With the release of Chaos Strikes Back, FTL still has one foot in the winner's circle."

The game was reviewed in 1991 in Dragon #171 by Hartley, Patricia, and Kirk Lesser in "The Role of Computers" column. The reviewers gave the game 4 out of 5 stars.

Niko Nirvi reviewed the game in MikroBitti and gave 98 points (out of 100) calling the difficulty level insane and mentioned a disappointing ending but nevertheless called the game "bewitching" and "classic".

== Legacy ==
Notable reception received "CSBWin", an Atari ST version based reverse engineered source code reconstruction by Paul R. Stevens around 2003, which led to many ports for modern platforms like Windows and Linux.
