= XPilot =

Multiplayer video game

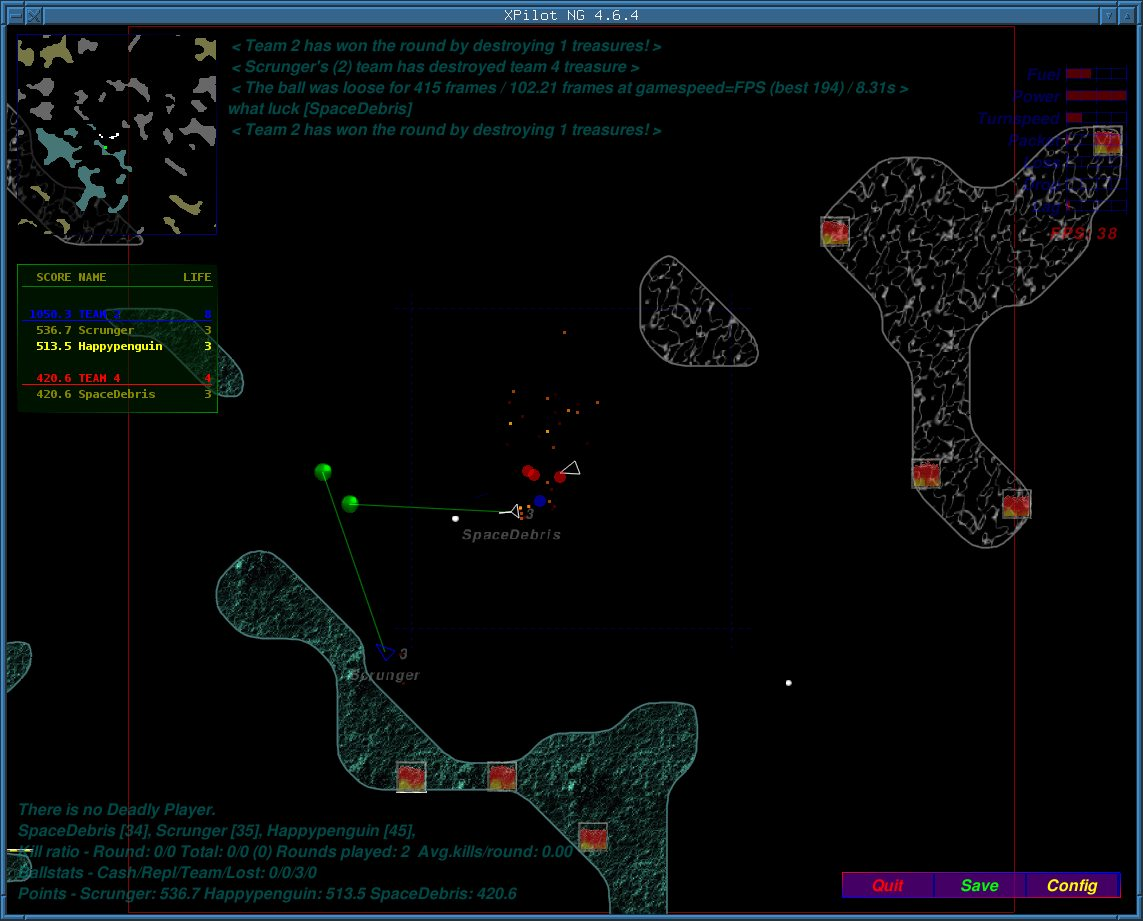
- Screen capture of XPilot NG running under fvwm on Linux.
- Developer: Various
- Platforms: Unix-like, Windows, Mac OS, iOS
- Release: 1992
- Genres: Multiplayer online game, multidirectional shooter
- Mode: Multiplayer

XPilot is a multiplayer video game. It is open source and runs on many platforms. Although its 2D graphics have improved over time, they still resemble the style of Thrust. Gameplay includes Capture the Flag, base defense, racing and deathmatches. XPilot uses a client–server architecture, in which a central metaserver receives information from all XPilot servers on the Internet.

== History ==
In 1991, Bjørn Stabell and Ken Schouten, then computer science undergraduates at the University of Tromsø, began writing XPilot, inspired by the earlier game Thrust. It was originally developed in C on HP9000 workstations which ran Unix. Soon after its first public release in 1992, Stabell and Schouten began receiving feedback, suggestions, and patches from players all around the world. Other XPilot users wrote documentation and contributed source code to the project. By 1996, there were nearly one hundred XPilot servers worldwide.

XPilot's code has been forked several times. XPilot5 is a complete rewrite of XPilot in C++. Unlike its predecessor, it comes with sound and is bundled with applications to configure the keyboard, ship shapes and behavior. The latest stable version of XPilot5 is 5.0.0. In late 2000, another group of developers began a branch of XPilot, later labeled XPilot NG (for next generation). Programmed in C, it contains two clients, either X11-based or SDL/OpenGL-based. Unlike the block-based maps of the original game, XPilot NG provides high frame rates and polygon maps. A new Java based map editor provides better map editing facilities. The latest version of XPilot NG is 4.7.2. In 2009, 7b5 Labs released XPilot iPhone, an XPilot client for Apple's iPhone and iPod Touch. It is based on XPilot and XPilot NG and uses touchscreen controls. While these modern versions implement many new features, they are mostly compatible with the original program.

== Gameplay ==
The metaserver contains a list of all XPilot maps on the Internet. These maps, created by users, feature several types of gameplay. In deathmatches, points are earned by destroying other players or robots. Users can increase their firepower by picking up items such as missiles, mines and lasers. Players can also defend themselves by gathering cloaks, shields, ECMs and armor. In racing maps, players earn points based on their finishing position. The objective of team games is to "destroy" the opponent's ball by placing it in the treasure chest. Team games may also be run in a slightly different Capture the flag mode. Other modes exist, like trying to survive as long as possible surrounded by cannons, by dodging the bullets, or combinations of different modes.

== Community ==
XPilot's in-game chat and multiplayer functionality spawned the formation of a community. Contact between players was facilitated by newsgroups such as alt.games.xpilot and later rec.games.computer.xpilot. Since 1991, several annual team tournaments, known as "Cups", have been held. After the first HTML and image-rendering web browsers were introduced, members of the community developed the game's online documentation.

== See also ==
- List of open source games
- SubSpace (video game)
