= Gravity Crash =

2009 video game

- Developer(s): Just Add Water
- Publisher(s): Sony Computer Entertainment
- Platform(s): PlayStation 3, PlayStation Portable, PlayStation Vita
- Release: PlayStation 3: EU: 24 November 2009; NA: 24 November 2009; JP: 24 December 2009; PlayStation Portable: JP: 26 August 2010; NA: 20 July 2010; EU: 21 July 2010; PlayStation Vita: NA: 12 August 2014; EU: 13 August 2014
- Genre(s): Multidirectional shooter
- Mode(s): Single-player, multiplayer

Gravity Crash is a 2009 multidirectional shooter video game developed by Just Add Water and published by Sony Computer Entertainment for the PlayStation 3. Released on the PlayStation Network, a port for the PlayStation Portable was released in 2010. Its visual style pays homage to arcade games of the 1980s. A PlayStation Vita port was released in August 2014 under the title Gravity Crash Ultra. The PlayStation Portable version was released on PlayStation 4 and PlayStation 5 on July 12, 2023.

== Gameplay ==
Gameplay screenshot

The player chooses a planet to visit from a top-level menu, and explores that planet in a two-dimensional side view. The planetary surfaces tend to be riddled with systems of caverns: manoeuvring through them while taking gravity into account is one of the game's principal challenges. Gravity Crash was inspired by three games in particular, Gravitar, Thrust and Oids.

The player can choose one of two control modes: in the first, the player's craft can fire only in the direction it is currently facing. In the second, the direction of fire is independent of the craft's orientation, controlled by the second joystick on the controller.

As an extra the game includes a shooting mini-game titled Gold Grabber, which is similar to the arcade game Robotron: 2084.

== Soundtrack ==
The game features music by video game musician Tim Wright, who composed a 16-track remix album and double 'A'-side single to complement the game.

== Reception ==
Gravity Crash received mostly positive reviews. Play's reviewer stated that the only bad thing was the "insane" difficulty level. Edge's reviewer also mentioned the difficulty, calling Gravity Crash a "stern", if "unspectacular", challenge.
