= TerraFire =

1997 video game

- Developer: ORT Software
- Publisher: ORT Software
- Designer: Owen Thomas
- Platforms: MS-DOS, Windows
- Release: MS-DOS: WW: October 1, 1997; Windows: WW: March 23, 2000
- Genre: Multidirectional shooter
- Mode: Single-player

TerraFire is a multidirectional shooter for MS-DOS. It was originally released on October 1, 1997 as shareware with a demo limiting the player to only the first eight levels. In 2005, TerraFire was re-released as freeware.

The game is best called a shoot 'em up, but unlike most games of this genre, the player is free to move in any direction, with physics similar to the 1979 arcade game Asteroids. Bullet patterns from enemies and obstacles are also far more sparse and predictable, and there are no bosses. The full version of the game has a total of 27 levels, where every fourth level is a bonus level which is a clone of the aforementioned Asteroids. The normal levels, which scroll both horizontally and vertically and wrap horizontally, have gravity and are completed by finding a nuke and dragging it out of the top of the level.

TerraFire uses pre-rendered 3D graphics and animation.

== Reception ==
Mikrobitti named TerraFire game of the month in their June/July 1998 issue. They called the game a Thrust clone and said the gameplay is splendid despite the game's simple appearance. ZDNet gave the game a score of five out of five and wrote: "TerraFire is a graphically pleasing, challenging arcade game in the Super R Type vein [...]". Computer Gaming World gave TerraFire the award for the best action/adventure game at ZDNet's 7th Annual Shareware Awards. They called it "a graphically pleasing, challenging arcade game". In a retrospective review, Rock Paper Shotgun called the game a "Gravitar homage with lovely parallax backgrounds and handsome faux-3D sprites".
