= Fly Harder =

1993 video game

- Developer: Starbyte Software
- Publishers: Krisalis Software; Starbyte Software (Germany)
- Programmer: Ralf Wienand
- Artist: Arno Seiler
- Composers: Torsten Faßbender-Wellenrausch (Fassbender-Wellenrausch; Ensonique Projects)
- Platforms: Amiga, CD32, Commodore 64
- Release: Germany: 1993; WW: 1994
- Genre: Multidirectional shooter
- Mode: Single-player

Fly Harder is a multidirectional shooter developed by Starbyte Software and published by Krisalis Software. The game was originally released for the Amiga and the Commodore 64 in 1993. A port for the Amiga CD32 was released in 1994.

== Plot ==
April the 6th, 2103. On its way from the Delta Tau Galaxy back to earth, the interstellar spaceship Irata enters the Zarkow system where they are to replenish their water and food supplies.

April the 7th, 2103. The Irata picks up some human settlers fleeing from Zarkow. The settlers inform the captain that the Targoid insect people have installed 8 powerful reactors in Zarkow's network of caverns to exploit the planet's supplies of energy and raw materials. Furthermore, the Targoids have invented an intricate security system which makes it almost impossible for strangers to enter the caverns.

April the 8th, 2103. Nokdar, captain of the Irata, decides to take action. A hand picked team consisting of the spaceship's five best pilots is chosen to break through the security system and disable the reactors. Their mission is to find the hidden energy spheres in the caverns and drop them on the reactors. This will cause the reactors to overload and thus destroy them.

== Gameplay ==
Fighting against airborne enemies and turrets in the 5th level of the game.

The gameplay of Fly Harder follows in the footsteps of gravity-based shoot 'em up games, like Gravitar and Thrust, where the player pilots a spaceship that is constantly subject to gravity and the craft's inertia. The players have to rotate the spaceship, thrust its engines and fire its weapons in order to shoot down enemies and navigate their way through the 8 stages of the game. The action takes place in free-directional scrolling areas that are presented in a side view. Each area features various types of airborne enemies as well as turrets which fire bullets at the ship. There are also security systems which consist of laser barriers that the player has to switch on or off to pass unhindered. This is accomplished by operating small switches throughout the levels.

The ship is equipped with an energy shield and will explode if it sustains too much enemy damage. However, unlike most games at the time, the ship's energy shield will automatically recharge if no damage is sustained for a brief period. Losing a life causes all the enemy turrets to replenish, emphasizing the restart points and making things more maze-based and methodical. Scattered throughout the stages the players can find power ups (which enhance the ship's firepower), fuel canisters (which replenish the ship's fuel) and the energy pods that they must use in order to cause the reactors to overload. The players must use the ship's tractor beam to carefully guide the energy pods through the landscape and place them inside the reactors. Once enough pods have been placed inside, the reactor gets destroyed and the level ends.

After each level, players are given a new password allowing them to restart the game from any level they want. Fly Harder also features customizable difficulty and gameplay settings. Players have the option to adjust the strength of the gravitational pull, as well as the aggression of the enemy A.I.

== Reception ==
Reception

Review scores
Publication	Score
Amiga Format	87%
Amiga Joker	34%
Amiga Power	90%
ASM	0/12
The One Amiga	83%

Fly Harder was met with polarized reviews from game critics. Amiga Power awarded the game with a score of 90%, calling it "the Thrust of the 90s". Their review praised the game's methodical gameplay and graphics, but warned the players about its steep learning curve by noticing that "it's practically impossible to play for the first hour or so". Amiga Format reached the same conclusion and gave the game a score of 87% arguing that "after the initial shock of crashing 40 times on the trot, Fly Harder becomes extremely addictive". The One Amiga gave it 83% and felt that the high difficulty was "to compensate for the fact that there are only eight levels", but they praised the high replayability of the game describing Fly Harder as "the kind of game that you will come back to time and again".

German publications panned the game for its high level of difficulty, with ASM describing it as "unplayable" and "a game for masochists", giving it a 0 out of 12. Amiga Joker felt that Fly Harder was a prettier but almost unplayable version "of an already outdated 8bit game" (referring to Thrust) and gave the game a score of 34%.

Retrospectively, Den of Geek placed Fly Harder at number 21 in their 2019 article "50 Underrated Commodore Amiga Games".
