= Asteroids Deluxe =

1981 video game

- Arcade flyer
- Developer: Atari, Inc.
- Publishers: Atari, Inc.
- Designer: Dave Shepperd
- Series: Asteroids
- Platforms: Arcade, BBC Micro, Atari ST, Atari 7800
- Release: April 1981: Arcade; NA: April 1981 BBC Micro 1984 Atari ST 1987 7800; WW: April 26, 2024
- Genre: Multidirectional shooter
- Modes: Single-player, multiplayer

Asteroids Deluxe is a multidirectional shooter arcade video game with monochrome vector graphics, released in April 1981 by Atari, Inc. It is the sequel to Asteroids (1979) and was designed to combat the saucer-hunting strategy of the original, allowing experts to play for extended periods; however, these modifications made it significantly more difficult and less accessible to players.

Ports of Asteroids Deluxe were released for the BBC Micro in 1984, the Atari ST in 1987, and the Atari 7800 in 2024. The game was followed by Space Duel in 1982 and the more direct sequel Blasteroids in 1988.

== Gameplay ==
Like in the original Asteroids, the objective is to score points by destroying asteroids and flying saucers. The player controls a ship that can rotate left and right, fire shots straight forward, and thrust forward. When shot, larger asteroids break apart into smaller pieces and fly in random directions, while the smallest asteroids are destroyed when hit. Deluxe replaces the hyperspace feature with shields which deplete with use. This game also introduces the "Killer Satellite", a cluster of ships that break apart and chase the player's ship when hit. Objects "wrap" from each edge of the screen to the opposite edge (e.g. from the right edge to the left, or the top edge to the bottom), as in the original.

In addition to the shield feature and the Killer Satellite, the most significant change in this version of the game is that the flying saucers can now target the player's ship across the screen boundary - meaning that if the saucer is close to the left edge and the player is at the right edge, the saucer may shoot toward the left edge and across the boundary to hit the player since their ship is closer that direction. In Asteroids, the saucers could only fire directly at the player's location on screen without considering the boundary, which led to the popular "lurking" exploit that enabled players to play for very long periods of time on a single credit. This updated strategy was in direct response to that exploit.

== Development ==
The Asteroids Deluxe arcade machine is a vector game, with graphics consisting entirely of lines drawn on a vector monitor, which Atari described as "QuadraScan". The key hardware consists of a 1.5 MHz MOS 6502A CPU, which executes the game program, and the Digital Vector Generator (DVG), the first vector processing circuitry developed by Atari. The DVG used for Asteroids Deluxe was designed by Wendi Allen (then known as Howard Delman), and used earlier in Lunar Lander and Asteroids. Most of the sound effects are implemented by custom circuitry, but some are generated via the POKEY sound chip.

== Ports ==
On April 26, 2024, Atari re-released Robert DeCrescenzo's homebrew port of Asteroids Deluxe as an official release for the Atari 7800, as well as for the Atari 2600+ and 7800+ consoles.
