= Bruce Webster =

American academic and software engineer

Bruce F. Webster is an American academic and software engineer. He is a principal at Bruce F. Webster & Associates and an adjunct professor in computer science at Brigham Young University.

== Early life and education ==
Webster received a full National Merit Scholarship to study computer science at Brigham Young University, graduating in 1978 with a bachelor's degree. He went on to work in computer science at the University of Houston-Clear Lake in Houston, Texas.

== Career ==
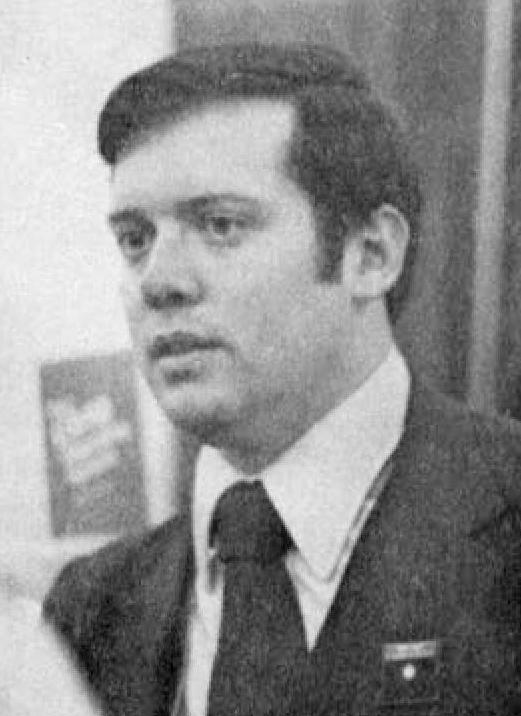
Bruce Webster in 1982 at the West Coast Computer Faire

Webster has written over 150 articles on the computer industry and software development. He has also written four books on information technology (IT) issues, including The NeXT book, Pitfalls of Object-Oriented Development, The Art of ‘Ware, and The Y2K Survival Guide, and contributed to two others. He authored PricewaterhouseCoopers' 2000 white paper, Patterns in IT Litigation: System Failure. He also wrote for two years as an IT management columnist for Baseline.

In the 1980s, Webster wrote articles and columns for BYTE and Macworld, and taught computer science at Brigham Young University. In the 1990s, he went on to help found another software startup, Pages Software Inc., where he served as Chief Technical Officer and chief software architect for five years. He then served as Chief Technical Officer at Object Systems Group (now OSG), reviewing troubled corporate IT projects, and subsequently worked as a Director at PricewaterhouseCoopers (ibid). He has run his own consulting firm since 2001. Since 2017 he has also served as an adjunct professor for the BYU Computer Science Department, teaching a senior-level software engineering course.

Webster was co-designer and principal programmer of the original Apple II version of SunDog: Frozen Legacy, a real-time space trading and combat game released in 1984. SunDog was cited in late 2022 by Todd Howard of Bethesda Game Studios as one of his inspirations for their forthcoming science-fiction open world game Starfield.

In a 2008 article, Webster coined the term "dead sea effect", a situation where tech organizations lose their best talents and as a result end up with a large number of less capable employees. In a 2024 comment, he mentions Annapurna Interactive's mass resignation as the "most extreme case of the Dead Sea effect" he has come across.

== Personal life ==
Webster currently resides in Provo, Utah, with his wife Sandra. He has been a member of the Church of Jesus Christ of Latter-day Saints since 1967 and has played an active role in the church. Webster used the history of Mormon pioneers as inspiration when designing Sundog.
