= Dungeon Master (video game) =

1987 video game

- Cover art by David R. Darrow
- Developers: FTL Games; Victor Musical Industries (X68000)
- Publishers: FTL Games; Victor Musical Industries (X68000)
- Director: Doug Bell
- Producer: Wayne Holder
- Designer: Doug Bell
- Programmers: Doug Bell; Dennis Walker; Mike Newton
- Artist: Andrew Jaros
- Composer: Wayne Holder
- Platforms: Atari ST, Amiga, Apple IIGS, MS-DOS, SNES, TurboGrafx-CD, X68000, PC-9801, FM Towns
- Release: NA: December 15, 1987; EU: 1988; JP: 1990
- Genres: Role-playing, dungeon crawl
- Mode: Single player

Dungeon Master is a role-playing video game featuring a pseudo-3D first-person perspective. It was developed and published by FTL Games for the Atari ST in 1987, almost identical Amiga and PC (DOS) ports following in 1988 and 1992.

Dungeon Master sold 40,000 copies in its year of release alone, and went on to become the ST's best-selling game of all time. The game was an influential early example of the first-person party-based dungeon crawler genre, with later examples including Eye of the Beholder (1991).

== Gameplay ==
Fighting a group of screamers (Atari ST)

In contrast to the traditional turn-based approach that was, in 1987, most common, Dungeon Master added real-time combat elements (akin to Active Time Battle). Other factors in immersion were the use of sound effects to indicate when a creature was nearby, and (primitive) dynamic lighting. Abstract Dungeons and Dragons style experience points and levels were eschewed in favor of a system where the characters' skills were improved directly via using them. Dungeon Master was not the first game to introduce these features. Dungeons of Daggorath for the TRS-80 Color Computer first employed them in 1982. Dungeon Master was, however, responsible for popularizing these elements. Other features of Dungeon Master included allowing players to directly manipulate objects and the environment by clicking the mouse in the enlarged first-person view. It also introduced some novel control methods including the spell casting system, which involved learning sequences of runes which represented the form and function of a spell's effect. For example, a fireball spell was created by mixing the fire symbol with the wing symbol.

While many previous games such as Alternate Reality: The Dungeon, The Bard's Tale, Ultima, and Wizardry offered Dungeons & Dragons-style role-playing, Dungeon Master established several new standards for role-playing video games and first-person video games in general, such as the paper doll interface.

As Theron, the player cannot progress past the first section of the game until they have selected at least one and up to four champions from a small dungeon containing 24 mirrors, each containing a frozen champion. The frozen champions are based upon a variety of fantasy archetypes to allow diversity within the player's party.

== Plot ==
Many champions have been sent into the dungeon with the quest to recover Librasulus' (the Grey Lord) firestaff. With the firestaff, Librasulus can take physical form again and defeat Lord Chaos. The player is Theron, the apprentice of the Grey Lord, that goes into the dungeon with the task to resurrect or reincarnate four champions, and guide them through the dungeon, to find the firestaff and defeat Lord Chaos.

If the player finds the firestaff and uses it to defeat Lord Chaos, this will be the real ending of the game. But there is also an alternative ending if the player finds the firestaff and then leaves the dungeon without destroying Lord Chaos.

== Development ==
Originally, Dungeon Master was started with the name Crystal Dragon coded in Pascal, and targeted the Apple II platform. Doug Bell and Andy Jaros (Artwork) began development in their development studio PVC Dragon, before they joined in 1983 FTL Games. It was finished there in C programming language and published in 1987 for the Atari ST first. A slightly updated Amiga version ported by Phil Mercurio was released the following year, which was the first video game to use 3D sound effects.

Dungeon Master was ported later to many platforms like PC (including support for the FTL Sound Adapter, a parallel port DAC external soundcard that is compatible with Atari joystick port controllers), Apple IIGS, TurboGrafx-CD, Super NES, X68000, PC-98, and FM Towns. The game was also translated from English into German, French, Japanese, Chinese and Korean.

According to "The Definitive CDTV Retrospective: Part II" by Peter Olafson, Dungeon Master was ported to the Amiga CDTV but this version was never completed because FTL could not obtain reliable information from Commodore about saving games to memory cards.

A Macintosh version was developed but not released. There exists a prototype for the Atari Lynx under the name Dungeon Slayers.

The packaging cover art was designed and illustrated by David R. Darrow, for which Andy Jaros posed as the leftmost character pulling on the torch. The woman in the scene was Darrow's wife, Andrea, and the muscular man in the background is unknown, but hired by Darrow from a local fitness club. The painting itself is 25 to 30 inches high and does not contain the word "Master". Darrow's painting portrays a scene from the prologue in the manual for Dungeon Master. It shows the three (or four) main characters' last few minutes alive, and is a portrayal of the player's challenge to defeat the antagonist, Lord Chaos. The heroes in the painting are Halk the Barbarian, Syra Child of Nature, Alex Ander – and Nabi the Prophet, who has been reduced to a bunch of skulls.

A soundtrack album, titled Dungeon Master: The Album, was released later. This album featured music composed by Darrell Harvey, Rex Baca, and Kip Martin. The original ST version and its faithful Amiga and PC ports contain no music. The album features music composed for the FM Towns game, as well as FM Towns version of Chaos Strikes Back, and some original tracks that were inspired by the games.

== Reception ==
Dungeon Master debuted on December 15, 1987 on the Atari ST, and by early 1988 was a strong seller, becoming the best-selling game for the computer of all time; Bell estimated that at one point more than half of all Atari ST owners had purchased the game. Because of FTL's sophisticated copy protection, many who otherwise pirated their software had to purchase Dungeon Master to play the game.

After unsuccessfully trying to fit the Amiga version into 512 KB, FTL shipped it requiring 1 MB. It was the first prominent Amiga game to require more than the standard amount of memory, likely causing many to purchase additional RAM; at least one manufacturer of Amiga memory bundled Dungeon Master with its memory-expansion kit. As with Wizardry, many others offered for sale strategy guides, game trainers, and map editors, competing with FTL's own hint book.

Hosea Battles Jr. of Computer Gaming World in 1988 praised the attention to detail in the dungeons' graphics, allowing players to "practically feel the damp chill of the dungeons portrayed", as well as those of the monsters, including the multiple facial expressions on the ogres. He said the control system works "extremely well" and "one's adrenaline really flows because the game is in real-time." Battles also praised the extensive use of sound effects, uncommon to RPGs. He complained that the manual does not describe monsters or their attributes, of a "frustrating" shortage of food and water replenishments and that the lack of a map makes the game "extremely difficult". Battles called the game "fantastic" and said "It is a welcome addition to any fantasy player's library. Those who want a good fantasy/role-playing game will love this one." Scorpia stated in the magazine in 1992 that the newly released IBM PC version's graphics "are surprisingly good, all things considered" despite the game's age, but wrote that "No endgame has ever given me so much trouble or frustration". Although she believed that the game "is still eminently worth playing, even years later[, and] still has something to offer the seasoned adventurer", because of the endgame Scorpia "can't give it a blanket recommendation". In 1993 she stated that "the game still holds up well after seven years, even graphically, and is worth playing today", but because of the ending was "not for the easily-frustrated".

Computer and Video Games in 1988 called the story a "cliché" but praised the graphics, sound and controls. The reviewer said Dungeon Master is an example of a title which "changes the way we think about games" and a "must for all roleplayers". Antic called the game as "revolutionary" as Zork and Flight Simulator II, citing "spectacular" graphics and stating that the game was "almost worth buying for the sound-effects alone". Despite the "commonplace" story "where once again, an Evil Wizard has taken over control of the world", the magazine advised readers to "buy this game". Advanced Computing Entertainment said the graphics are "largely repetitive" but "wonderfully drawn" and wrote the "Sound is sparse but the effects are great." The reviewer called it a "thrilling game with plenty in it to keep you searching, fighting and pondering for a long time." He summarised the game as a "huge, immensely playable and very atmospheric mixture of role-playing and adventure. If you've been looking for a real-time role-playing game that manages to keep you interested for long periods of time, then your prayers have been answered." The Games Machine wrote: "the innovative character selection system and icon display are both neatly implemented and quick to use", praised the "superb" atmosphere - enhanced by the spare but apt sound effects - and called the game universe "believable because of its details". The magazine praised the color and clarity of the monster graphics and the shading of the surroundings. It called the story and setting a "wholly engrossing scenario [which] creates a complete world which can be manipulated at will: its depth fully reflects the two years it took to program it. The presentation - an interesting and evocative novella neither too involved to prove turbid not too short to be unhelpful - is superb." The reviewer summarised: "Dungeon Master is a role-player's dream, but capable of providing a good deal of enjoyment for any ST owner." STart told readers to "be prepared to shed every preconception you ever had about computer games. This is Dungeon Master". Noting the strong sales, the reviewer called it "a true video game phenomenon" and reported that "not talking to my boyfriend for a week because he lost our master spell list was certainly not an overreaction". Jerry Pournelle named Dungeon Master his game of the month "and maybe of the year" in July 1988: "Everything you heard about this is true; the graphics are incredible".

Jim Trunzo reviewed Dungeon Master in White Wolf #15 (April/May 1989), rating it a 4 out of 5 and stated that "This product is highly recommended to anyone interested in fantasy gaming. 'Dungeon Master' pushes all computers to their limits and will likewise challenge anyone who plays it."

Kati Hamza of Zzap!64 said of the Amiga version: "The first-person perspective ensures an incredibly realistic atmosphere - you just can't help really getting into the feeling of walking through damp echoing caverns looking for ghosts." The reviewer also said: "The puzzles are incredibly devious, the spell system is really flexible and the need to practise magic and spells gives the whole thing that extra-special depth." The reviewer asserted: "This has to be the most amazing game of all-time, anywhere, ever". In the same issue Gordon Houghton said: "This is just about the most incredible game I've ever seen. When you pick it up you find you lose whole days of your life." He said: "The best time to play it is late at night in a room by yourself - it's guaranteed to scare the life out of you. It's like Gauntlet in 3D, but about a hundred times better. If you enjoy arcade adventures, RPGs or combat games, but it: it's the perfect combination of all three." Reviewer Maff Evans professed to be little enthused by RPGs generally but said "I know a brilliant game when I see one and this is a brilliant game." He praised the scares delivered by ambushing monsters and said "you'd have to be deaf, dumb and blind not to be affected by the atmosphere". The magazine complained that saving games is "a bit laboured" but praised the "extremely detailed and accessible" controls, "interactive, detailed and extremely atmospheric" scenery and said the clarity of the graphics made the game an unusually accessible RPG. It summarized: "you'll be playing for months" and said Dungeon Master was "The best game we've ever seen".

Also reviewing the Amiga version, Graham Kinsey of Amazing Computing wrote that Dungeon Master "completely blows away any other RPG on the Amiga market today, and may do for some time". Dave Eriksson of Amiga Computing praised the "brilliant" graphics, sound effects and replay-value and said "Dungeon Master is the most stunning role-playing game I have seen on the Amiga". Antic's Amiga Plus felt the game "captures the essence of Dungeons & Dragons role-playing games". The reviewer praised the "dazzling" graphics, called the user-friendly controls "a real joy" and said the game was the "best graphics adventure for the Amiga to date." Your Amiga called the sound "extremely well done" and said the "most striking feature of the game is the attention to detail". The reviewer called the game "amazing" and recommended: "If you never buy another game, by [sic] this one."

Andy Smith of Advanced Computing Entertainment several months after its release called Dungeon Master "one of the all time classics" and said "What makes Dungeon Master really special (apart from the marvellous 3D graphics and eerie sound effects) are the puzzles". The game was reviewed in 1988 in Dragon #136 by Hartley, Patricia, and Kirk Lesser in "The Role of Computers" column. The reviewers gave the game 4½ out of 5 stars. The Lessers reviewed the PC/MS-DOS version in 1993 in Dragon #195, giving this version 5 stars. In 1997, ten years after release, Dungeon Master got again a 5 out of 5 stars score in a review.

=== Awards ===
Dungeon Master received the Special Award for Artistic Achievement from Computer Gaming World in 1988. It achieved the top place in the magazine's game rankings system, and was entered into its hall of fame in November 1989. In 1990 the game received the second-highest number of votes in a survey of Computer Gaming World readers' "All-Time Favorites". In 1996, the magazine named Dungeon Master the 49th best game ever. In 1996, GamesMaster listed the game 42nd in their Top 100 Games of All Time.

The following is a comprehensive list of other awards received by the game.

- Special Award for Artistic Achievement awarded in 1988 by Computer Gaming World
- Adventure Game of the Year, 1988 — UK Software Industry Awards
- Best Selling Atari ST Title, 1988 — UK Software Industry Awards
- Best Role Playing Game, 1988 — Power Play (German)
- Best Role Playing Game, 1988 — Tilt
- Best Sound Effects, 1988 — Tilt
- Game of the Year, 1988 — Computer Play
- Best Atari ST Game, 1988 — Computer Play
- Game of the Year, 1988 — Génération 4 (French)
- "Golden Sword" Award, 1988 — The Adventurer's Club of the UK
- Best Role Playing Game, 1988 — The Adventurer's Club of the UK
- "Beastie Award", 1988 — Dragon
- Best Atari ST Title, 1988 — Dragon
- Best Game, 1989 — Amiga World
- Best Role Playing Game, 1989 — Amiga World
- Best Amiga Game, 1989 — Game Players
- Best Amiga Game, 1989 — Datormagazin (Swedish)
- "Beastie Award" Best Apple //GS Title, 1989 — Dragon
- Best Game, 1989 — .info
- Best of the Amiga, 1989 — Compute!
- Inducted as an original member in the Computer Gaming World Hall of Fame in 1989
- Designated as one of the 100 Best Games by PowerPlay (German, January 1990)
- 16th best game of all time in Amiga Power (May 1991)

=== Sequels and legacy ===
While Dungeon Master itself was inspired by early Ultima games, it amazed Ultima developer Origin Systems's employees; Origin founder Richard Garriott said that he was "ecstatic" at discovering the "neat new things I could do" in the game. It influenced Ultima VI's graphical user interface and seamless map, and the later Ultima Underworld. Game journalist Niko Nirvi wrote that no 3D role-playing title before Ultima Underworld (1992) could challenge Dungeon Master as a game.

In 1989, FTL Games released a Dungeon Master sequel, Chaos Strikes Back.

To date, Dungeon Master retains a small but faithful following online, with several fan-made ports and remakes available or in development. Notable reception received a faithful reconstruction of the Atari ST version, called "CSBWin", which was released in 2001. Reverse engineered in six months work from the original by Paul R. Stevens, the available source code of CSBwin led to many ports for modern platforms like Windows and Linux. In 2014, Christophe Fontanel released another reverse engineering project which tries to recreate all existing versions and ports.

The villagers in the sandbox game Minecraft were inspired by the shopkeepers from Dungeon Master 2.

== See also ==
- Legend of Grimrock
