= Gravitar =

1982 video game

- Arcade flyer
- Developer: Atari, Inc.
- Publishers: Atari, Inc.
- Designers: Mike Hally; Rich Adam; Joe Coddington (hardware)
- Programmers: Arcade; Rich Adam; Atari 2600; Dan Hitchens
- Platforms: Arcade, Atari 2600
- Release: Arcade: NA: August 1982; Atari 2600: October 1983
- Genre: Multidirectional shooter
- Modes: Single-player, multiplayer

Gravitar is a 1982 multidirectional shooter video game developed and published by Atari, Inc. for arcades. Using the same "rotate-and-thrust" controls as Asteroids and Space Duel, the game was known for its high level of difficulty. An Atari 2600 version programmed by Dan Hitchens was released in 1983.

== Gameplay ==
The north planet in the second universe

The player controls a small blue spacecraft in a star system with several planets to explore. If the player moves their ship into a planet, they will be taken to a side-view landscape. Unlike many other shooting games, gravity plays a fair part in Gravitar: the ship will be pulled slowly to the deadly star in the overworld, and downward in the side-view levels. Great precision is demanded of the player, as the ship rotates too slowly to allow a player to correct their mistake if they apply too much thrust and fly toward an obstacle.

The player has five buttons: one each to rotate the ship left or right, one to shoot, one to activate the thruster, and one for both a tractor beam and force field. Gravitar, Asteroids, Asteroids Deluxe and Space Duel all used similar 5-button controlling systems.

In the side-view levels, the player has to destroy red bunkers that shoot constantly, and can also use the tractor beam to pick up blue fuel tanks. Once all of the bunkers are destroyed, the planet will blow up, and the player will earn a bonus. Once all planets are destroyed, the player will move onto another solar system.

The player will lose a life if they crash into the terrain or get hit by an enemy's shot, and the game will end immediately if fuel runs out.

Gravitar has 12 different planets. Red Planet is available in all 3 phases in the universe; it contains a reactor. Shooting the reactor core activates a link. Escaping the reactor successfully moves the player to the next phase of planets, awards bonus points and 7500 units of fuel. Reactor escape time reduces after each phase and eventually becomes virtually impossible to complete.

The reactor is at the end of a narrow tunnel

After completing all 11 planets (or alternatively completing the reactor three times) the player enters the second universe and the gravity will reverse. Instead of dragging the ship towards the planet surface, the gravity pushes it away. In the third universe the landscape becomes invisible and the gravity is positive again. The final, fourth universe, has invisible landscape and reverse gravity. After completing the fourth universe the game starts over, but the reactor escape time will never reset back to high levels again.

The programmers thought that even the best players could never complete the most difficult planets on the invisible levels. Neither of the key developers themselves, Mike Hally and Rich Adam, have ever completed their own game "without cheating" (their words).

== Development ==
Gravitar was developed under the name Lunar Battle. 5,427 arcade cabinets were produced.

== Ports ==
The silver label version of Atari 2600 Gravitar was originally only available to Atari Club members. It was later sold in stores in limited quantities. Atari eventually released it in the red box and label style with larger distribution.

== Legacy ==
Gravitar inspired the 1986 computer game Thrust.

Dual-stick shooter Black Widow was offered as a conversion kit for Gravitar. The kit included a new marquee, control panel, side art, and an additional wiring harness. The kit used the original Gravitar PCB, with a few small modifications and a new set of ROM chips. Many factory-built Black Widows were produced using unsold Gravitar cabinets, and although they contain original (not Gravitar conversion) board sets, they had Black Widow side art applied over the Gravitar sideart.

Gravitar is part of the Atari Anthology for Windows, Xbox, and PlayStation 2 as well as the Atari Anniversary Edition Vol. 2 for Dreamcast, PlayStation, and Windows. Gravitar is also included in the Atari Flashback 3. In April 2019, Gravitar was added to the TeslAtari game collection included in Tesla vehicles.

In the 1983 James Bond film Never Say Never Again, Domino Petachi (Kim Basinger) is seen about to play Gravitar before meeting up again with Bond (Sean Connery) at Casino de Monte Carlo. The indoor scene was filmed at Elstree Studios in Hertfordshire, England - the arcade cabinets used would have been sourced from Atari's European factory in Ireland.

A revamped version of the game, titled Gravitar: Recharged, part of the Atari Recharged series, was released on May 12, 2022 for Atari VCS, and on June 2 for Microsoft Windows, Nintendo Switch, PlayStation 4, PlayStation 5, Xbox One, and Xbox Series X/S.

== Records ==
Dan Coogan, of Phoenix, Arizona, set a Gravitar world record, scoring 8,029,450 points from December 22 to 23, 2006, playing for 23 hours and 15 minutes. The previous world record for score was 4,722,200, which held for 24 years, set by Ray Mueller of Boulder, Colorado, on December 4, 1982, after playing for 12 hours and 21 minutes.
