= Thrust (video game) =

1986 video game

- Publishers: Superior Software; Firebird
- Designer: Jeremy C. Smith
- Composer: Rob Hubbard (C64, ST)
- Platforms: BBC Micro, Acorn Electron, Amstrad CPC, Atari 8-bit, Atari ST, Commodore 16, Commodore 64, ZX Spectrum
- Release: 1986
- Genre: Multidirectional shooter
- Mode: Single-player

Thrust is a 1986 video game programmed by Jeremy C. Smith (who later co-authored Exile) for the BBC Micro and published by Superior Software. The player's aim is to manoeuvre a spaceship by rotating and thrusting, as it flies over a two-dimensional landscape and through caverns. The gameplay of Thrust was heavily inspired by Atari's Gravitar.

Thrust was ported to the Acorn Electron, Commodore 64, Amstrad CPC, Atari 8-bit computers, Atari ST, Commodore 16/Plus 4, and ZX Spectrum. Firebird released a sequel, Thrust II, in 1988.

== Gameplay ==
The aim is to pilot a spacecraft which must pick up a pod using a tractor beam and fly it into space. The ship and pod are subject to gravity and inertia, and being connected by a stiff rod can end up spinning around each other, out of control. Hitting the walls of the cave with the ship or the pod results in death.

The Acorn Electron version of Thrust runs in monochrome.

Each planet has turrets that fire bullets at the ship, which can be destroyed with a single shot. There is also a reactor that powers the defence system of each planet. If the reactor is shot enough, the turrets will cease firing for a short amount of time. Hitting the reactor with enough bullets causes it to go critical and destroy the planet in 10 seconds. The ship must escape into space before this happens, with (more points are gained) or without the pod.

Fuel is needed to manoeuvre the ship and can be collected with the tractor beam; if the ship runs out of fuel, the whole game is over. A shield is also available, although when it's activated, it expends fuel and the ship cannot shoot.

Later levels have doors that are opened by shooting a panel. After all six levels have been completed, the levels start again, but first with reversed gravity, then with the planet and walls invisible unless the shield is used, and finally with invisible walls and reversed gravity. After the 24th level is complete, a message is displayed. Two more messages are available after completing the 48th and 72nd level, and from then on the third message is repeated. On the BBC Micro implementation, the messages displayed are "Support Hotol", "Physics is fun" and "I love space".

== Release ==
Before releasing the BBC/Electron version of the game, Superior Software licensed the rights to produce ports of the game to Firebird Software who published the game on their £1.99 budget label. Firebird's C64 version was released first, reaching the top of the Gallup All Formats and Commodore 64 charts. Nine weeks later, Superior Software's full price release entered the BBC Top Ten at number one.

Superior promoted their release with a competition. Prizes included a trophy, £250 in cash, and a book by astronomer Patrick Moore.

== Legacy ==
Hobbyist-written clones were released for the Atari 2600 (2000) and Vectrex (2004) consoles using the same name as the original.

Thrust was credited by Bjørn Stabell as an influence on the game XPilot.

Jeremy C. Smith went on to develop the 1988 game Exile with school friend and Starship Command programmer Peter Irvin. He died in an accident four years later.
