= BeebEm =

- Stable release: 4.19 / 1 May 2023
- Repository: github.com/stardot/beebem-windows
- Operating system: Microsoft Windows, UNIX/Linux, Mac OS X, GP2X
- Licence: GNU General Public License
- Website: http://www.mkw.me.uk/beebem/

BeebEm is a BBC Micro emulator, first developed by David Gilbert in 1994 and since improved by a number of people, most notably Mike Wyatt who currently maintains the emulator and its website. Although BeebEm's first incarnations were for UNIX-based systems, the version for Windows (98 or later) is now the most popular. BeebEm is also available for Mac OS X, Agenda VR3 and Pocket PC.

BeebEm is copyrighted freeware, and its source code is distributed with the emulator under the GPL licence.

As of version 4.13 (January 2011), BeebEm for Windows emulates the following hardware:

- BBC Micro Models B, B+ and Master 128
- Integra B expansion board
- Cassette, DFS and ADFS filing systems
- Econet networking
- 65C02 and Z80 second processors
- AMX Mouse

The TMS5220 Speech Generator emulator was removed from version 4.1 onwards due to licensing issues.

BeebEm can read images from files representing tape (in UEF format), DFS or ADFS discs, ROM cartridges and SCSI or SASI hard disks. It is capable of running the vast majority of BBC Micro software, including classics such as Elite, Exile and Firetrack.

Jon Welch, who maintains the Mac port of BeebEm, has shown a preview of BeebEm (the Windows version) emulating the Master 512 computer, including the GEM windowing system.
