= Acorn Communicator =

Business computer by Acorn Computers

- Manufacturer: Acorn Computers
- Type: Business Computer
- Released: 1985; 41 years ago
- CPU: 65816 @ 2 MHz
- Memory: 512–1024 KB RAM; 32 KB CMOS RAM; 256 KB ROM
- Input: Keyboard

The Acorn Communicator is a discontinued business computer developed by Acorn Computers. Mentioned in the computing press in late 1984 as the C30, previewed in early 1985 with estimated pricing between £500 and £800, in late 1985 with a built-in liquid-crystal display, and subsequently unveiled in a slightly different form, the system sold in very low numbers to companies requiring a computer with a built-in modem.

Orders for the machine were reported in late 1986, with an initial 500 units to be rebadged by Thorn EMI Business Communications for its own customers and approximately 1400 units going to Pickfords Travel for use in its high street stores. As a "smart videotex terminal" and a "complete turnkey comms solution" featuring Prestel connectivity and built-in word processing and spreadsheet capabilities, the extensibility of the product through the development of additional software appealed to customers such as Pickfords. Although not openly priced, rumoured pricing of a Communicator was around £1000 in late 1985 for the basic model, remaining at a similar price level in early 1987 with colour monitor included.

== Origins ==
Launched as part of Acorn's range of new products (alongside the Acorn Cambridge Workstation) targeting "new and more specialised market areas" following the decline of the home computer market and the financial crisis that led to Acorn's rescue by Olivetti, the Communicator had its origins in a concept mentioned publicly by co-founder Chris Curry as early as April 1984, envisioning a communications terminal aimed at business users offering a single-device solution for online information access in an elegant package with a small footprint. Acting as a personal computer, desirable features included the ability to run existing business software, offer networking support and connectivity to mainframes, connect to public data services such as Prestel and Telecom Gold mailboxes, and also support services over other cable-based infrastructure (such as cable television infrastructure then being introduced in the United Kingdom). A meeting between Curry and product design consultant David Morgan, who had approached Acorn with an idea for a personal computer, led to a deeper collaboration that would establish the nature of the Communicator's physical characteristics.

Intending for the product to be customised and sold by other vendors, an emphasis was placed on a physical product design that would permit such customisation and offer a degree of modularity. Thus, a "basic keyboard unit" would be central in any eventual product configuration, being augmented by a telephone, display, storage, printer and other peripherals and accessories. Although Morgan had proposed an electroluminescent display within a lid folding shut over the keyboard in an arrangement that would become common with laptop computers, cost and reliability concerns directed the design towards an optional LCD display and the use of a separate monitor. Alongside the industrial design activity, Ram Bannerjee of Acorn's research and development division was directed to find existing Acorn-developed components that would fit in the physical unit to deliver "a smaller, neater, faster, sweeter machine". From August 1984, four engineers and a sales and marketing employee worked from Acorn's original premises to reconcile the functionality requirements of the product with the physical constraints imposed by the product design, eventually requesting only a minor modification to the height of the keyboard and a slight extension of the keyboard "to accommodate another row of function keys". The Communicator was envisaged as being an always-on device, capable of being programmed to access online services at predetermined times, and it was therefore decided not to provide a power switch on the unit itself.

== Features ==
Alongside its personal computer features, an Acorn brochure for the C series describes a range of telephony facilities offered by the product range including auto-dialling and auto-answering for data and electronic mail, call answering and message storage using optional microcassette hardware, and telex sending. Microcassettes could also support dictation. A real-time clock, perpetual calendar, desk diary and calculator are featured.

The system uses a 16-bit Western Design Center 65816 chip rather than the 8-bit MOS Technology 6502 or variants, which were used by virtually all of Acorn's previous microcomputer products. 128 KB or 512 KB RAM could be fitted, expandable to 1024 KB. For display capabilities, it employs the ULA originally developed for the Electron (reputed to be the largest ULA or gate array ever developed at that time) and supported a monochrome version of Teletext using software emulation for access to services such as Prestel. Full-colour teletext was supported using an additional expansion board.

RGB and composite video outputs were provided as standard interfaces. A 25-character by 8-line LCD (256 x 64 pixels) is described as an option and is depicted in the C series brochure, with a monochrome monitor also offered as an option. One version of the Communicator was initially indicated to provide a teletext adapter "enabling it to receive Ceefax and Oracle", and the C series brochure notes a "cable TV interface for teletext" as optional. The microcassette facilities featured in the C series brochure were reportedly prototyped as a peripheral, and the telephone handset featured in the brochure was supported by an optional bracket. General expansion capabilities were provided by an "Electron-style expansion connector" as also featured in the Master Compact.

The machine offered no built-in storage mechanism (such as a disk drive) nor a connector for an external storage mechanism, although the C series brochure mentions a 3.5-inch disk drive as an option. A separate file and print server "in the same style as the Communicator itself" offering floppy and hard drive support plus a Centronics printer interface, based on the MOS Technology 6512 CPU and having 64 KB RAM plus 64 KB ROM, was intended to be the means by which Communicator machines, fitted with a standard Econet module, would access files and print documents. The Acorn Filestore product had essentially this specification and capabilities, and documentation was made available describing its use with the Communicator. Distinct versions of the FileStore E01 base unit and E20 hard disk unit were made for use with the Communicator, these having a different colour but, in the case of the E01 unit, also providing different software. The E01S unit was also usable by the Communicator and could be expanded by the E40S and E60S hard disk units.

The Communicator provided an office software suite, including View (word processor), ViewSheet (spreadsheet), Videotex and VT100 terminal emulation, plus Econet local area networking, a telephone line input port for connection to the public switched telephone network (PSTN), an RS423 serial port for connection to serial printers or other computers, and a Centronics parallel port to connect a printer. The system software that bound the packages together was a mixture of BBC Basic and assembly language. The software development team was led by Paul Bond, who led development of the original Acorn MOS, a keen pilot who would occasionally fly team members in his Cessna when things were quiet.

First versions of the Communicator were monochrome-only; later (but before first customer delivery), a daughterboard provided full colour.

A briefcase version of the Communicator was apparently offered as the Spectar II by Advanced Medical Communications, supposedly for use by pharmaceutical company representatives, offering a bar code reader and "credit-card size memory packs", with one version having "a flat screen in the briefcase". Acorn records suggest that the memory cards employed the Astron format, apparently being evaluated by Acorn who had acquired one of the "100-or-so" development systems for the technology. The system documentation confirms this hardware configuration.

== Hardware details ==
The hardware specifications of the Communicator, observed from manufactured units, include the G65SC816 CPU, ULA, 512 KB of dynamic RAM, 32 KB of static RAM, 6522 VIA, AM2910PC modem, SCN2641CC1N24 UART, and SAA5240 teletext decoder and display generator, (with 2 KB of static RAM presumably employed for page storage). The components chosen and the capabilities provided are broadly similar to the BT Merlin M2105 variant of the Acorn Electron, with an upgraded CPU, the addition of teletext circuitry, the provision for Econet, and the omission of speech synthesis hardware apparently refining the Communicator as a product offering in the same general category.

The Centre for Computing History notes that an example of the machine in their possession does not contain a Ferranti-manufactured ULA, indicating that a Mietec IC with an Acorn part number of 0252,602 could possibly be a ULA from another source. According to archived Acorn product documentation, it is indeed a ULA, although the system documentation refers to it as a video ULA, despite it also providing support for the keyboard and sound generation.

The system documentation notes the presence of 32 KB of video RAM (accessed at 1 MHz), 512 KB or 1 MB of system RAM (accessed at 2 MHz), 32 KB of non-volatile RAM, up to 512 KB of internal ROM, and up to 3.5 MB of ROM accessible via the expansion bus. The modem, asynchronous serial port, Econet port, printer port, and expansion bus connector are noted, along with an IIC bus providing access to a real-time clock and the DTMF dialler. Support was present to access dynamic and non-volatile RAM using a RAM filing system, and the Spectar II variant of the machine supported a memory card filing system allowing "the use of up to eight ASTRON Data Cards at one time".

The development system for the Communicator as intended for original equipment manufacturer (OEM) use was centred on the BBC Master 128 with ARM second processor, floppy and hard drives, a monochrome monitor, and an external ROM expansion. The provided development tools included the TWIN editor, MASM assembler (supporting the 65SC816 instruction set), and the 65TURBO emulator for running the tools and utilities written for 6502-based machines.

== Legacy ==
Ultimately, the Communicator, being a product from Acorn's custom systems division, was apparently abandoned when that division was closed having contributed to "more than two-thirds" of Acorn's £3.3 million loss in 1987. It having been noted that Acorn would "probably throw the computer away and use the case for something else", Acorn did indeed appear to employ a very similar case for the Master Compact, incorporating the expansion connector on the right-hand side of the unit, and even retaining the casing features for the Communicator's optional handset.

Although considered to be either a potential successor to the Model B in the BBC Micro range or to be presaging the arrival of a 16-bit BBC "Model C", the Communicator's heritage draws much from the Electron and its BT Merlin M2105 derivative, giving some substance to contemporary speculation about a successor to the Electron being readied for launch, despite such speculation ultimately proving to be about the Master Compact.

In 1986, Acorn co-founder Chris Curry was reported to have recruited the team responsible for developing the Communicator - 12 employees in all including technical project manager Ram Bannerjee - for his new company, General Information Systems, with one potential application of the machine or a follow-on product suggested as being the online submission of news stories by journalists and other newspaper contributors.
