= Philip's Music Writer =

Music notation software

- Original author: Philip Hazel
- Initial release: June 1988
- Stable release: 5.33 / 22 December 2025
- Written in: C
- Operating system: Panos, RISC OS, Unix-like
- Type: Scorewriter
- License: GPL-2.0-or-later
- Website: quercite.dx.am/pmw.html

In computing, Philip's Music Writer or PMW, formerly known as Philip's Music Scribe or PMS, is a music scorewriter written by Philip Hazel. It was mentioned in the Center for Computer Assisted Research in the Humanities publication Computing in Musicology in 1993 and as of 2025 remains under active development and is available as free software.

== Development ==
The software was originally written in order for Hazel to typeset recorder music for his children. It was written in BCPL for an IBM mainframe at the University of Cambridge and also ran on a system running Panos, which was later sold as the Acorn Business Computer. The program was subsequently ported to Acorn's Archimedes running Arthur and later ported to Unix-like systems. It began as commercial software and was later released as free software.

On-screen proof-reading was rudimentary on the Acorn Business Computer, which used the BBC Micro for screen output. The Arthur version initially ran at the command line, but was later converted to use the WIMP and outline fonts. Sibelius was released in 1993. Hazel later observed that composers and arrangers generally preferred such WYSIWYG editors, while music engravers tended to prefer text input scorewriters, because of the increased degree of control available. The learning of such text input requires more time investment by the user, so the notation was designed with the aim of being "both compact and easy to learn". The Linux version (ported in 2003) is "back to its roots", being command line driven.

The software uses PostScript fonts named PMW-Music and PMW-Alpha, which were conceived by the author and Richard Hallas. The fonts were originally designed as RISC OS outline fonts.

As of 2024, it remains under active development as free software.

== Features ==
Musical notation is provided to the software in textual form, which generates output to a printer or for saving in PostScript or Drawfile format. Simple MIDI files and sound output can also be generated.

== Reception ==
The software was mentioned in the Center for Computer Assisted Research in the Humanities publication Computing in Musicology in 1993, and chapter 18 in Beyond MIDI: The Handbook of Musical Codes, MIT Press (1997, ISBN 0-262-19394-9).
