= Panos (operating system) =

Discontinued operating system

PANOS
- Developer: Acorn Computers
- Written in: Modula-2
- Working state: Historic
- Initial release: 1984; 41 years ago
- Marketing target: Academic and scientific user community
- Platforms: BBC Micro 32016 Second Processor, Acorn Cambridge Workstation
- Default user interface: Command-line interface

PANOS is a discontinued computer operating system developed by Acorn Computers in the 1980s and released in 1985, which ran on the 32016 Second Processor for the BBC Micro and the Acorn Cambridge Workstation. These systems had essentially the same architecture, based on a 32-bit NS32016 CPU; the ACW having a BBC Micro-based "I/O processor". Access to the I/O processor was through a NS32016 firmware kernel called Pandora.

Panos ran on the NS32016 and was a rudimentary single-user operating system, written in Modula-2. It provided a simple command-line interpreter, a text editor and access to DFS, ADFS or NFS file systems via the I/O processor. Targeted at the academic and scientific user community, it came bundled with compilers for the FORTRAN 77, C, Pascal and LISP programming languages.

== Commands ==
The following list of commands is supported by the Panos command line interpreter.

- .space
- .Delete
- .Help
- .key
- .NewCommand
- .Obey
- .pwd
- .Quit
- .Run
- .Set
- .swd
- .wait
- Access
- Catalogue
- Configure
- Copy
- Create
- Delete
- Echo
- Logon
- Rename
- Set
- Show
- Star
