= BBC Master =

Microcomputer

BBC Master Series
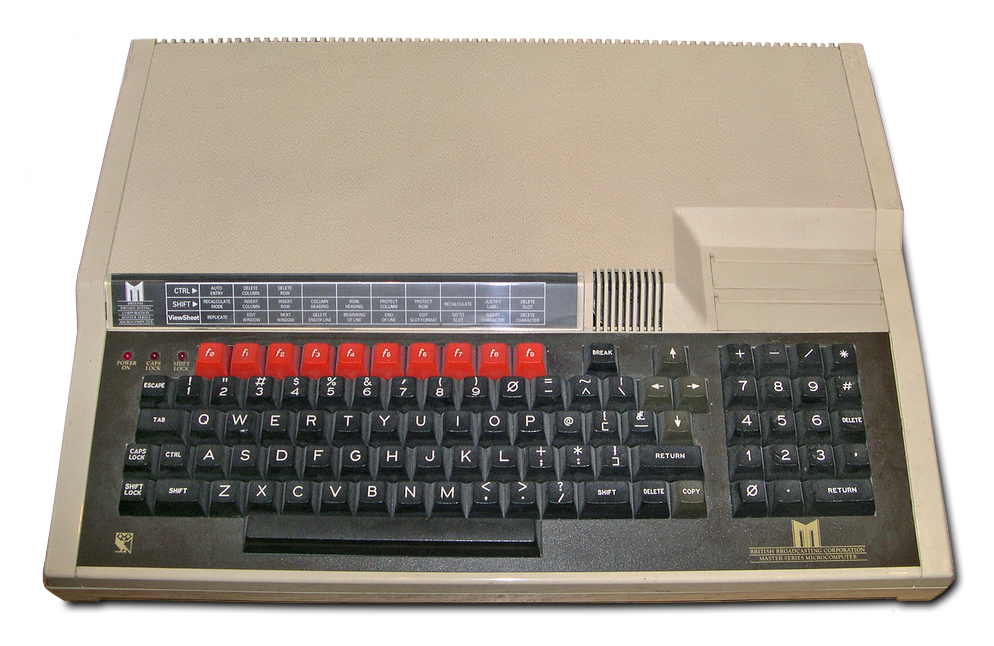
- Acorn BBC Master 128
- Type: 8-bit Microcomputer
- Released: Early 1986; 40 years ago
- Discontinued: 1994
- Operating system: Acorn MOS, optional DOS Plus
- CPU: MOS Technology 65SC12, optional second processor Intel 80186 or 65C102 depending on model
- Memory: 128 KB–512 KB
- Graphics: Motorola 6845, Mullard SAA5050
- Sound: Texas Instruments SN76489
- Predecessor: BBC Micro Model B
- Successor: Acorn Archimedes

The BBC Master is a home computer released by Acorn Computers in early 1986. It was designed and built for the British Broadcasting Corporation (BBC) and was the successor to the BBC Micro Model B. The Master 128 remained in production until 1993.

== Design ==
The Master series featured several improvements over earlier BBC Micro models. Rather than the MOS Technology 6502 microprocessor used by the Model B, Master series models used the slightly improved 65C12. Fabricated using CMOS technology, the 65C12 used less power than the 6502 and offered somewhat better performance, reportedly "almost as fast" as the original 3 MHz 6502 second processor for the BBC Micro. The systems had 128 KB of dynamic RAM as standard, alleviating the shortage of available RAM which had previously discouraged use of the display modes offering the highest quality graphics on earlier models. Of the total 128 KB of RAM, 64 KB was provided as standard RAM, being used for applications, screen memory and system workspace. Another 64 KB was provided in the form of four 16 KB bank-switched pages of sideways RAM.

Of the 64 KB standard RAM, the lower region of 32 KB was employed in a fashion familiar from earlier models, providing workspace for languages, applications and the system, also hosting screen memory for many programs, particularly games. While the 65C12 ensured software compatibility with the Model B, it perpetuated the architectural limitations of the earlier models, with a 16-bit address bus providing direct access to only 64 KB of memory at a time, thus necessitating the use of paging mechanisms to make additional RAM available. Access to the upper 32 KB region of standard RAM was provided by one such mechanism to take over some of the demands made on the lower memory region by the system. It was divided into three separate regions, each with a code-name, following Acorn's architectural traditions:

Codename	Size	Physical address range	Logical address range	Description
LYNNE	20 KB	0xB000–0xFFFF	0x3000–0x7FFF	Shadow RAM (freeing conventional screen memory for use)
HAZEL	8 KB	0x9000–0xAFFF	0xC000–0xDFFF	Paged ROM workspace (filing system workspace)
ANDY	4 KB	0x8000–0x8FFF	0x8000–0x8FFF	System workspace (function key, graphics system and character definitions)

20 KB of this upper region could be assigned as shadow RAM to host the screen memory, freeing up the conventional screen memory region for applications. The remaining 12 KB was available to the system for workspace, freeing up memory that would normally be claimed by ROMs such as filing systems. The cumulative effect of enabling shadow RAM and using the upper memory for workspace made almost 29 KB available for normal programs and was said to "transform the machine" from its predecessors.

Use of the 64 KB of sideways RAM favoured the installation of ROM images into each of the 16 KB banks, with Acorn having announced a "ROM licencing scheme" to authorise the use of the company's ROM-based software in RAM. However, a version of BASIC known as BAS128, previously released for the BBC Model B+ 128, was provided on disk and was able to use the full 64 KB of sideways RAM as workspace, thus expanding the memory available to BASIC considerably. Other Acorn languages did not support this arrangement, however.

Although the extra instructions of the 65C12 permitted slightly greater code density, the OS and BBC BASIC ROMs, still limited by the memory architecture to 16 KB each, were augmented by additional ROMs. In total, the updated OS, known as MOS 3.2 occupied 35 KB and incorporated features previously introduced in the Graphics Extension ROM for the BBC Micro, along with additional commands and system calls plus a variety of enhancements. The improved version of BBC Basic was named Basic 4, fixing bugs in the earlier Basic 2 and introducing enhancements and new functionality such as a TIME$ variable yielding the current date and time in a concise but human-readable format. The inclusion of a real-time clock to keep the date and time was a notable built-in feature of the Master 128 and derived models, together with 50 bytes of battery-backed CMOS RAM to retain details of the machine's configuration while powered off.

To hold the expanded OS and BASIC, the Master 128 was fitted with a ROM device having a capacity of one megabit, or 128 KB. Alongside the OS and BASIC, a text editor suitable for writing programs was included, DFS and ADFS provided filing system support to access files stored on disk, the View and ViewSheet applications respectively offered word processing and spreadsheet functionality. A terminal emulator was also included to support serial communications over the machine's RS423 port or the optional internal modem.

The Master series largely carried forward many of the core architectural features of the earlier BBC Micro models. The sound chip used in earlier models was retained, but the dedicated speech interface was omitted, with a "plug-in speech cartridge" anticipated by one reviewer for the Master 128. Although chips such as the 6522 VIA and 6845 CRTC were retained in the Master series, much of the discrete logic of earlier models was consolidated into CMOS gate array chips to perform tasks such as handling the keyboard, input/output and some display functions. This left an impression of the inside of the Master 128 being "another world" compared to the original BBC Micro, featuring fewer but larger chips.

In terms of expansion ports, the Master 128 retained all of the standard interfaces of the BBC Micro. One notable addition to the Master 128 was that of an internal modem socket permitting the installation of a modem without occupying the machine's RS423 serial port. An Econet interface could also be fitted internally at a relatively low cost of £49 including VAT. However, the main addition to the Master 128's expansion capabilities was the inclusion of an internal connector for second processor expansions employing Acorn's Tube interface. The first of such internally connected second processors, known as co-processors, was the Turbo co-processor featuring a 4 MHz 65C102 and 64 KB of RAM, later followed by the Master 512 upgrade board featuring a 10 MHz 80186 and 512 KB of RAM.

Outwardly, the Master series models added a numeric keypad alongside the familiar keyboard, and the Master 128 and its variants incorporated two cartridge slots behind the keypad, these employing sockets that provided a superset of the Acorn Electron Plus 1 cartridge interface capabilities, supporting the use of physically compatible Electron cartridges, but also supporting enhanced electrical characteristics for some of the cartridge connector pins.

Although the Master series was intended to be compatible with "legally written" software for the older models, there were some problems running older programs, particularly games. Conversely, although few programs were ever targeted specifically at Master series machines (except the Master 512), many later BBC games (and Master versions of earlier classics such as Elite) included enhanced features which took advantage of the extra memory.

=== ROM upgrade ===
An upgrade to the Master 128 operating system ROM was released by Acorn in early 1990, providing bug fixes and some performance and functionality enhancements, with the filing systems benefiting in particular. View, Viewsheet and Edit applications all saw various levels of enhancement. One notable feature was the introduction of "relocatable" language (or application) ROM support, permitting appropriately written ROM-based software to automatically take advantage of a second processor, if fitted. Priced at around £45, it was noted that since the copyright message in the ROM was dated 1988 and the manual dated October 1989, such an upgrade might have been more widely adopted by users (and the relocatable ROM feature adopted by software producers) had it been released earlier, with the Master Compact ROM having already benefited from some of the featured improvements, such as direct entry of "foreign characters" or "top-bit-set characters" from the keyboard.

=== Battery charging hazard ===
Acorn issued a safety warning for the Master 128 and ET models in 1986 regarding the battery installed in the machine. This battery was in a circuit that would charge the battery "contrary to the recommendations of the battery manufacturer". Due to the risk of combustion with this particular lithium battery arrangement, Acorn introduced a remedy involving its replacement with a different solution using three alkaline batteries fitted next to the power supply.

== Models ==
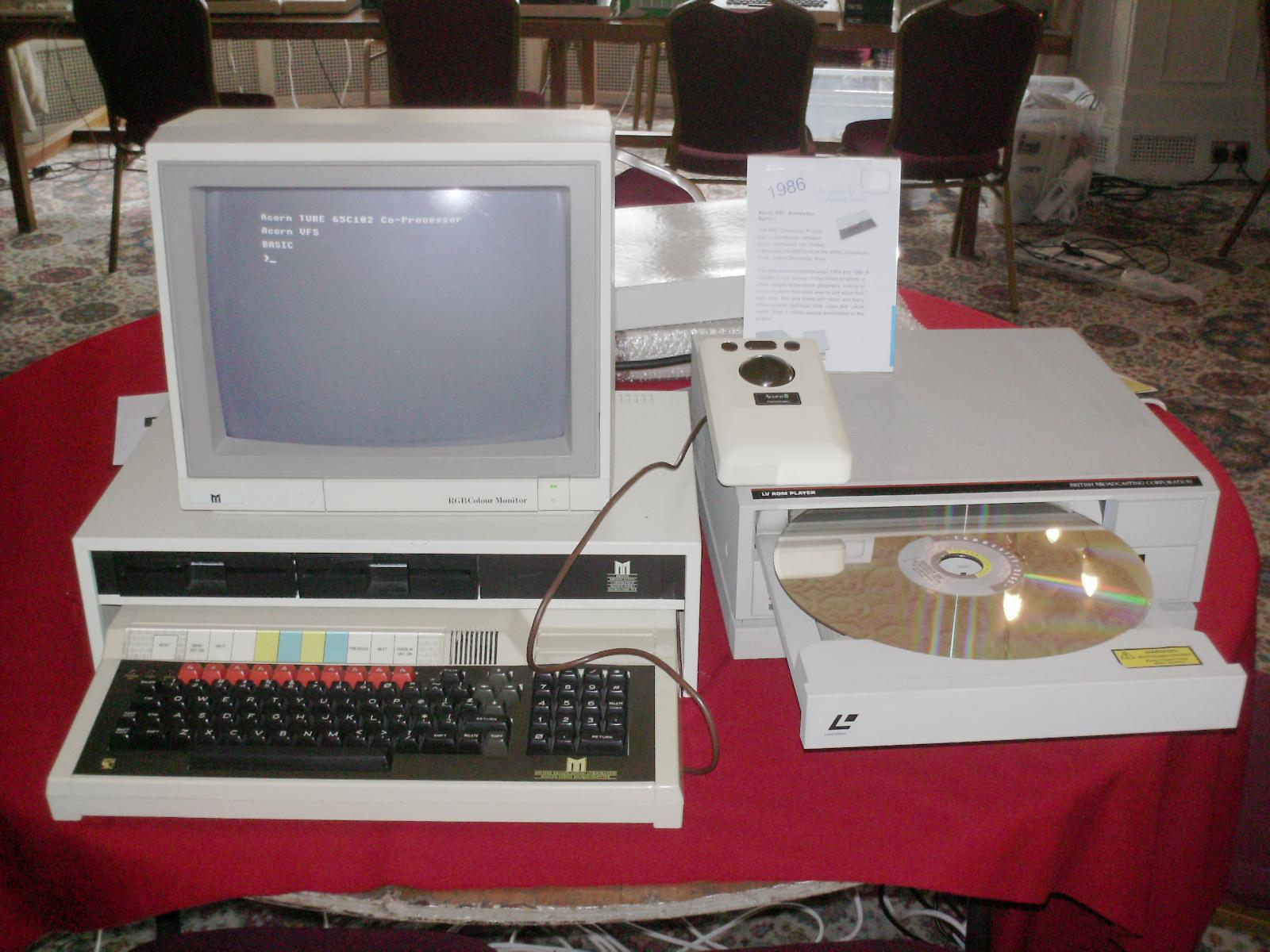
The BBC Master as part of a BBC Domesday System

The Master series consisted of several different models, all of which apart from the Master Compact were variants of the same basic design.

=== Master 128 ===
This was the "foundation of the new BBC range" when launched. The 128 in the name referred to its 128 KB of RAM, though it also featured 128 KB ROM. A disc interface was fitted, but the drives themselves were not included in the base product, these being offered by third parties and by Acorn as an official expansion. The machine was introduced at a price of £499.

=== Master Turbo ===
This was a Master 128 with 4 MHz 65C102 co-processor card (which could be either bought with the machine or added to an existing Master 128). This upgrade cost £125 when introduced.

=== Master AIV ===
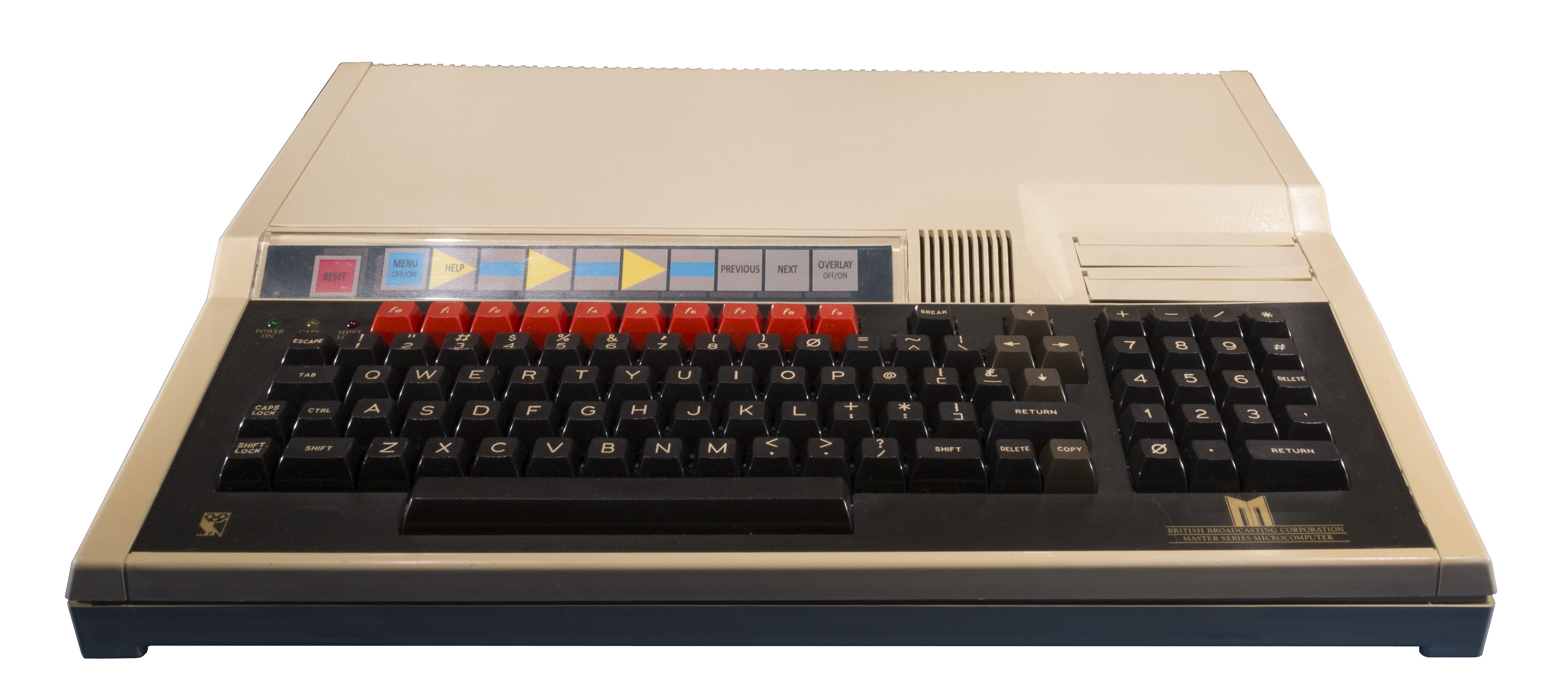
BBC Master AIV

The Master AIV (Advanced Interactive Videodisc) was essentially a Master Turbo model with a SCSI interface and a VFS (Videodisc Filing System) ROM added, and formed the basis of the BBC Domesday System. Although normally supplied as part of a Domesday System, with LaserVision player, Domesday videodiscs, monitor and trackball included, an upgrade kit was also available to turn a normal BBC Master into a Domesday System.

=== Master ET ===
The ET (Econet Terminal) system was designed for use in a network and as such had no interfaces except RGB and Composite video, plus an Econet interface module and ANFS fitted as standard (it was usually an option). It used the same main circuit board as the Master 128, but the components for missing interfaces were simply not fitted (though there was nothing stopping them being added later by someone with appropriate soldering skills). The internal ROM also contained much less software than that of the Master 128. This reduced configuration allowed the machine to be priced somewhat cheaper than the Master 128, being introduced at £399.

=== Master 512 ===
This system boasted a co-processor card with a 10 MHz Intel 80186 and 512 KB memory. It also had the ability to run DOS Plus and the GEM graphical user interface. The co-processor card was introduced at £499 as an upgrade to the Master 128, but its price was subsequently reduced to £399.

The competitiveness of the Master 512 was constrained by its compatibility with various DOS applications, with this being limited by "protection and direct use of IBM hardware" by some applications. The additional memory requirements of DOS Plus, when compared to those of PC DOS, and the requirements of the GEM desktop caused potential problems when running some applications, although memory expansions existed to mitigate such problems. System call compatibility was only assured for MS-DOS and PC DOS 2.1, but other DOS versions were not supported, and undocumented system call usage ("fairly rare, but does include some Microsoft packages") could cause applications to run incorrectly. Software written for later GEM versions would also not necessarily run correctly.

A product by Shibumi Software called Problem Solver aimed to address various compatibility issues related to the increased speed of the co-processor relative to a traditional IBM PC, display and keyboard differences (also supporting the BBC Model B keyboard for users of that machine with the co-processor attached), the behaviour of "memory resident packages" such as Sidekick, and the behaviour of particular applications. The product reportedly allowed well-known programs such as Ashton Tate's dBase III and Borland's Turbo C and Turbo Prolog to work on the co-processor.

To remedy compatibility issues caused by a lack of memory, one company, Essential Software, provided an upgrade service augmenting the fitted RAM of the Master 512 upgrade with four 1 megabit devices providing 512 KB to yield a total of 1 MB of RAM. Priced at £99, and also compatible with Problem Solver, the upgrade overcame the elevated memory requirements of DOS Plus relative to MS-DOS and also allowed the system to meet the requirement of some applications to have 640 KB of memory available. Consequently, GEM 3, Ventura Publisher, WordPerfect 5.0 and dBase IV were all reported as being compatible. The company also produced a selection of utilities for the Master 512, including the Co-Processor Filing System (CPFS) which allowed the 512 KB of co-processor memory to be used as a RAM disc by the computer when operating in its "native" BBC Micro mode.

Along with compatibility issues, the pricing of the Master 512 upgrade also inhibited its competitiveness. The estimated price of an IBM PC clone of £500–800 compared "very favourably with the £900 needed for a complete Master 512", this being the Master 512 upgrade together with the base system, monitor and disk drives, considering that the clone would also include a monitor and drives in the price. The price was further reduced to £199 plus VAT in early 1987, with GEM Desk Top, GEM Write and GEM Paint being provided free with the upgrade, and a "final price cut to £99" was reported in 1989, effectively exhausting the remaining stocks. Although largely abandoned by Acorn as the company shifted its emphasis to the Archimedes range, one commentator considered it "one of the most exciting products Acorn has ever developed".

=== Master Scientific ===
The Master Scientific was announced at the time of the BBC Master's launch, but was not produced. It was to have an 8 MHz 32016 co-processor with 32081 floating point processor and 512 KB of RAM, running the PANOS operating system. This was similar to the previous external 32016 Second Processor. Ultimately, Acorn dropped the Scientific due to unspecified technical problems with the co-processor, also indicating that 512 KB of RAM appeared to be insufficient for the target audience, whose applications tended to need 1 MB of RAM, this already being provided by the upgraded 32016 Second Processor product known as the Cambridge Co-Processor.

=== Master Compact ===
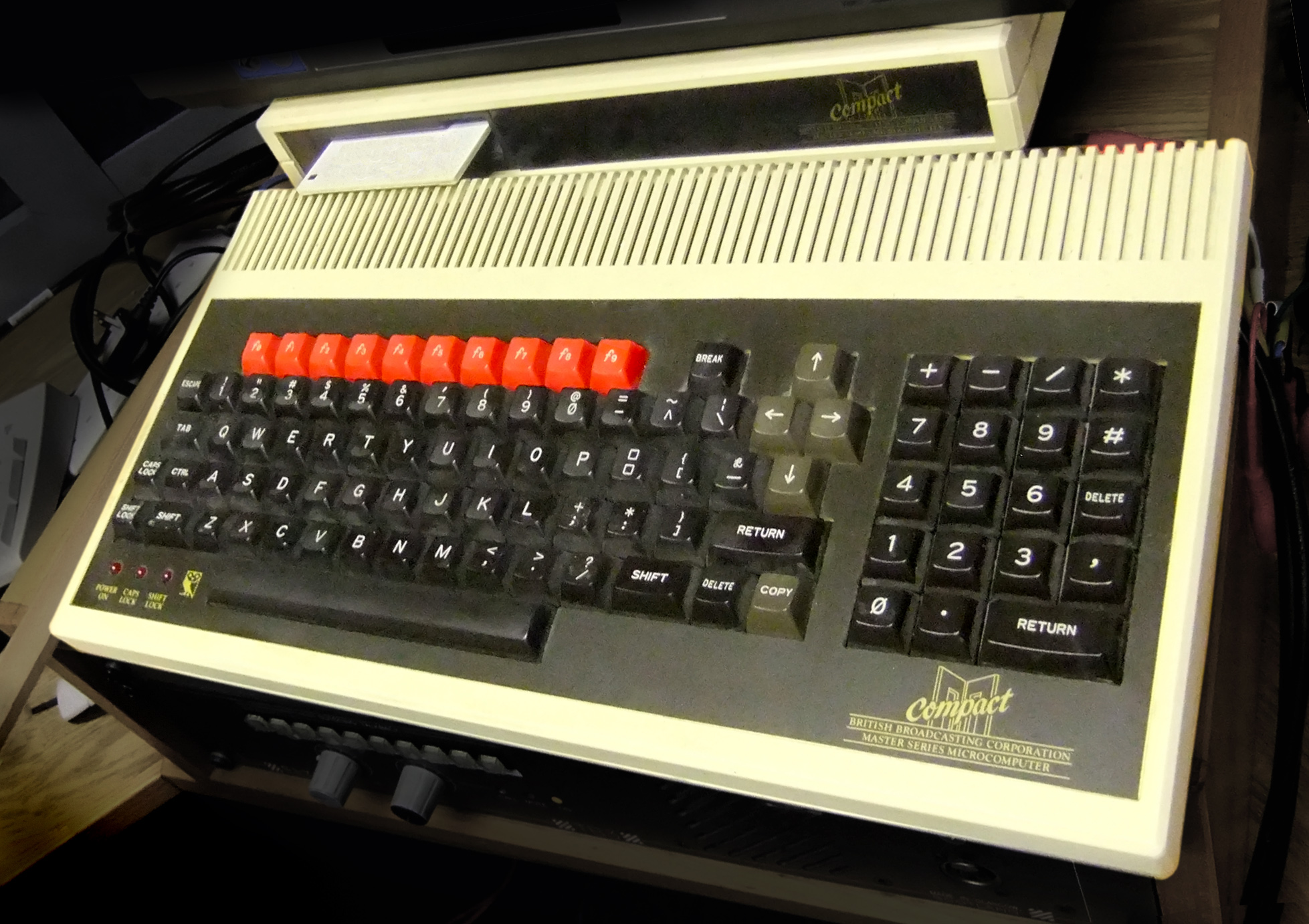
BBC Master Compact – both the keyboard (front) and under-monitor unit (rear) can be seen.

The Master Compact GUI

This model is, as the name indicates, a compact version of the Master 128 (ostensibly known as the "Baby B" during development) with some expansion functionality removed and other expansion options added, and with different bundled software. Unlike previously released Acorn microcomputers, it was sold by Acorn as a complete system bundled with disk drive and monitor (and the first high-volume system from Acorn to do so, preceded by the unreleased Acorn Business Computer, the low-volume Acorn Cambridge Workstation, and the PC-compatible Olivetti M19 system rebadged as the Acorn M19), aiming to provide a "one plug" solution that had, at the time of release, been successfully popularised by manufacturers such as Amstrad. Indeed, one reviewer gave credit to Amstrad for having engineered the delivery of "an innovative, cheap machine for education" – the Compact – through robust competition with Acorn in the sector.

Although the Compact has a "three box" arrangement, the main functionality of the system is actually provided in the keyboard unit, much like the Master 128, but rather reduced in size in comparison to the Master 128 and Model B, being styled on the Acorn Communicator. The unit under the monitor housed a 3 1/2-inch floppy disk drive and the system power supply. Both monitors supplied with the Compact were Philips models: a "green screen" monochrome monitor for high-resolution applications connected using "an Electron-style phono socket", whereas the colour monitor provided a 0.42mm dot pitch "generally billed as high resolution" and offered the traditional RGB monitor connector used by previous Acorn machines. However, the colour monitor also provided a SCART connector, anticipating "future applications" employing more colours and even "overlaying video pictures". The Master Compact was also sold as a "TV system" bundling a PAL television adapter that was also sold separately.

The cartridge and cassette ports were removed as a space saving measure, and RS-232 hardware not populated on the circuit board as standard. A multifunction mouse and joystick port was provided as a 9-pin D type with its function configured in software. A Centronics printer interface was also provided. The 1 MHz bus and analogue port were not provided on the Compact. Additionally, no internal sockets were provided for adding a co-processor or 2nd processor. However, the machine did include a 50-way expansion edge connector on the right side of the keyboard, that was similar to cartridge socket #3 on a Master 128.

Various third-party suppliers restored some of the removed expansion functionality via the expansion connector, such as support for Electron and Master 128 cartridges and the provision of various BBC Micro expansion connectors. Some suppliers instead chose to adapt existing peripherals to the built-in ports of the machine. For example, Morley Electronics employed the mouse/joystick port to attach their teletext adapter to the Compact. Such adaptations were facilitated by the availability of the User Port signals via pins provided by the joystick port, together with three signals (PB5, PB6 and PB7) provided by the general expansion connector.

Acorn reportedly designed the Compact to appeal to home users and to primary education, with the single-plug power connection regarded as more convenient for setting up a machine that might be moved around in a school, and the choice of 3 1/2-inch discs using the ADFS format was regarded as conducive to "handling many small files" and "distinguishing between different topics or users on the same disc". Amongst the bundled software, Acorn's adoption of Logotron's Logo implementation was seen as particularly welcome. In an effort to increase sales of the Compact to education, Acorn reduced the price of the machine in late 1987, bundling the Mertec Compact Companion interface with it to provide the BBC range's traditional expansion connectors, pricing it at £344 including VAT without monitor.

Unlike the other models in the series which provided a battery-backed clock and memory for configuration settings, the Compact utilised EEPROM storage for its configuration with support for only a limited number of writes, making the EEPROMs "a consumable, like a battery" requiring "replacement at intervals". Hence, it had no built-in real-time clock facility, although the time could be fetched via Econet where available, being applied to ADFS file timestamps. As a result of this, the *TIME and TIME$ commands returned dummy values. Only the ADFS Version 2 filing system was supplied as standard, running via a Western Digital 1772 chip (a faster version of the widely used 1770), though it is possible to load a 1770 DFS ROM into sideways RAM, or to insert a ROM or EPROM containing it.

The keyboard on the Compact was the first to move away from using the traditional "sprung-key" keyswitch design used by the rest of the BBC Micro family. Instead, it used a rubber-plastic moulding membrane. An input method was provided to permit the input of "foreign characters" or "top-bit-set characters" – character codes in the range from 128 to 255 – from the keyboard.

The chip-count was also reduced vs. the rest of the Master range, via the use of 4× custom gate array chips.

The version of BASIC on the Compact included re-coded mathematical routines, said to provide a 30% speed increase over the version included in the rest of the Master series. This version of BASIC was called Basic4(1986), aka 'BASIC41'. This was later replaced with version 'BASIC42' in 1987. This later BASIC ROM included the updated message (vs previous BBC BASIC ROMs):

Roger Wilson & R.A. Sack

—

The Compact included Acorn's first publicly available GUI. Little commercial software, beyond that included on the Welcome disk, was ever made available for the system, despite the claim by Acorn at the time that over 100 titles would be "set for distribution on 3.5in disc format for the Compact launch". The most avid supporter of the Master Compact appeared to be Superior Software, who produced and specifically labelled their games as Master Compact compatible. Software for the Compact was comparatively expensive (typically £20 for a game) due to the increased costs of adopting, and publishing on, the 3 1/2-inch disk format, alongside the established 5 1/4-inch disk format for the Master and earlier BBC Micro.

The machines were built by Rank Xerox in Hertfordshire. Ultimately, the Compact was discontinued in 1989 with "over eighty thousand Compacts and Olivetti's Prodest version" having been sold, with Acorn shifting its focus to the Master 128 as "its core 8-bit machine".

==== Olivetti Prodest PC 128 S ====
Olivetti were named as being interested in releasing a version of the Master Compact in Italy under the Olivetti Prodest brand, subsequently announcing the model as the PC 128 S aimed at the home and small business markets. Unlike the Compact, the PC 128 S was bundled with a mouse, the Nidd Valley Digimouse.

In the UK the Digimouse was sold with Clares' Artroom, an illustration package, later being made available to purchase on its own. Clares' Artroom was localised for the PC 128 S and sold under the name Project.

In addition to the localisation of the system itself, various applications were localised for the PC128S including View, ViewSheet, ViewPlot, and ViewIndex, along with a number of games including Aviator, Revs, XOR, and Doctor Who and the Mines of Terror. Pricing for the PC 128 S started at 995,000 lire for a system with monochrome monitor or 1,295,000 lire with a colour monitor (equivalent to €1,205 and €1,568 respectively in 2020, adjusted for inflation).

== Specifications ==
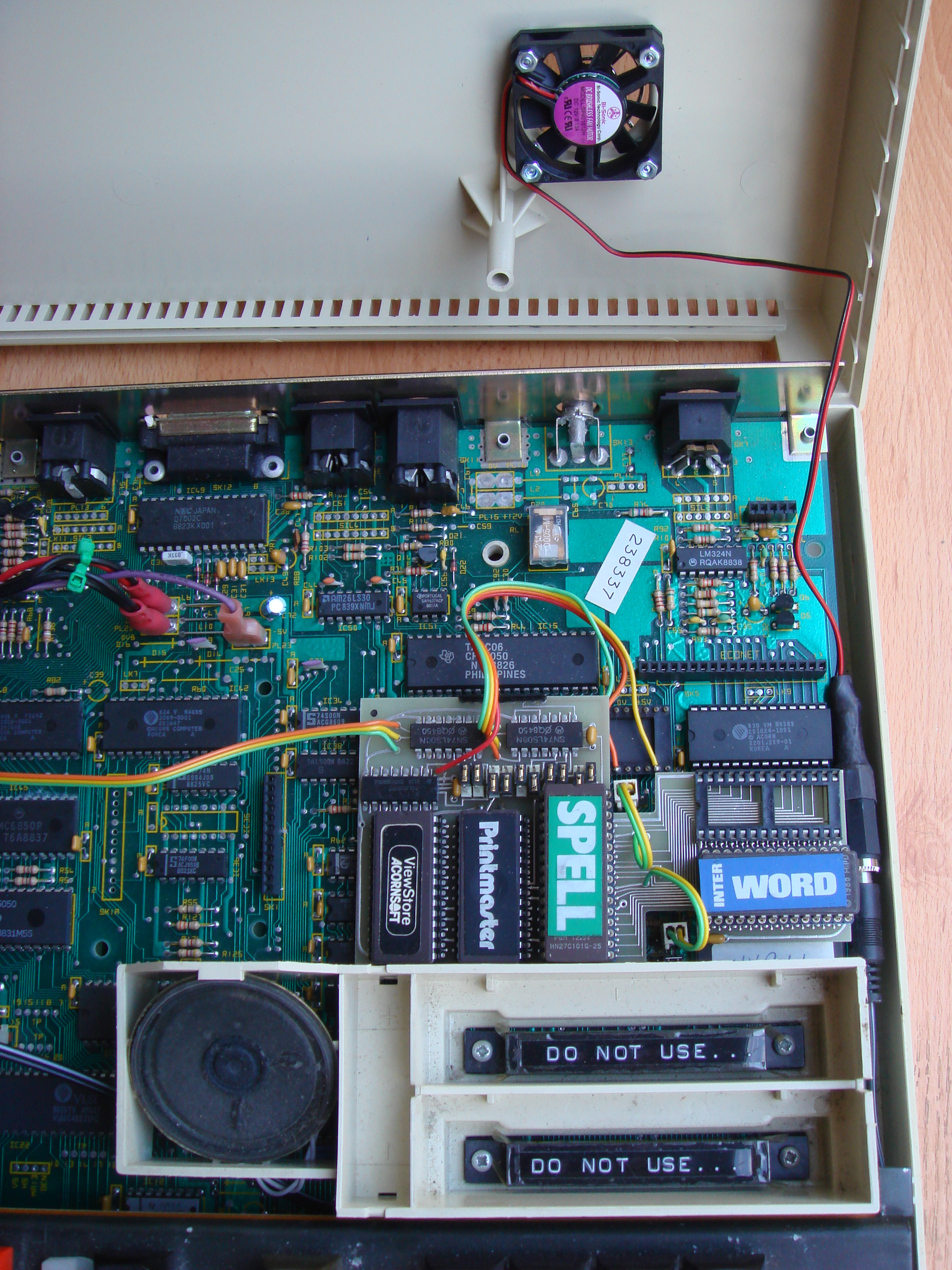
Internal image of a Master 128 showing Vine Micro Romboard4 fitted, meaning the cartridge slots can no longer be used – a non-standard cooling fan has also been added by the owner.

- 2 MHz Rockwell R65SC12 processor
- 128 KB ROM in the Master 128, Master Turbo, and Master 512. Comprising a 16 KB MOS (Machine Operating System), always accessible, and seven 16 KB sideways ROMs, any one of which could be paged into memory at a time:
  - 16 KB Terminal emulator and MOS extras (such as the cassette filing system) in paged ROM 15
  - 16 KB Acornsoft View (word processor) in paged ROM 14
  - 16 KB Advanced Disc Filing System in paged ROM 13
  - 16 KB BBC BASIC in paged ROM 12
  - 16 KB Acorn Screen Editor AKA Edit (text/BBC BASIC editor) in paged ROM 11
  - 16 KB ViewSheet (spreadsheet) in paged ROM 10
  - 16 KB Disc Filing System and Sideways RAM utilities in paged ROM 9
- 64 KB ROM in the Master ET. Comprising a 16 KB MOS (Machine Operating System), always accessible, and three 16 KB sideways ROMs, any one of which could be paged into memory at a time:
  - 16 KB MOS extras (such as the cassette filing system and Sideways RAM utilities) in paged ROM 15
  - 16 KB Advanced Network Filing System in paged ROM 14
  - 16 KB BBC BASIC in paged ROM 13
- 128 KB RAM, comprising:
  - 32 KB main user program/data storage
  - 20 KB "shadow" video memory (paged over main user RAM)
  - 12 KB OS workspace (paged over ROM)
  - 64 KB workspace accessible to user machine code applications (divided into up to four 16 KB regions to act like volatile paged ROMs)
- Full-travel keyboard with a top row of ten red-orange function keys ƒ0–ƒ9 and AT-style numeric keypad. The BREAK reset key could be physically disabled by rotating a small plastic cam, particularly useful in educational environments
- Highly configurable graphics display based on the Motorola 6845. Unlike on the original BBC Micro, separate video RAM was used so that choosing a high-resolution mode did not reduce the amount of available user RAM. (However, user RAM could still be used as the video buffer if required, in order to allow effects such as double buffering.) Eight graphics modes were provided by the system ROM:
  - Modes 0 to 6 could display a choice of colours from a logical palette of sixteen, though only eight physical colours could really be generated by the hardware: the eight RGB colours (black, red, green, yellow, blue, magenta, cyan, white) and the same colours in a flashing state;
  - Modes 3 and 6 were special software (framebuffer) text modes. To save RAM, the count of lines was reduced from 32 to 25. As this would reduce the height of the frame, filler rows were created between each line of text when the frame was output, where no pixels were read from the framebuffer. This creates characteristic black lines between the rows of text when a different background colour is set, and a blank gap at the bottom of the display with the left-over pixels. The screen mode is otherwise held in memory as a regular graphics mode.
  - Mode 7's Teletext capability was provided by a Mullard SAA5050 Teletext chip.
  Graphics mode	Resolution (X×Y)		Hardware colours	Video RAM		Type
  Graphics mode	Char cells	Pixels	Hardware colours	used (KB)	map	Type
  0	80 × 32	640 × 256	2	20	0x3000–0x7FFF	Graphics
  1	40 × 32	320 × 256	4	20	0x3000–0x7FFF	Graphics
  2	20 × 32	160 × 256	8	20	0x3000–0x7FFF	Graphics
  3	80 × 25	640 × 200	2	16	0x4000–0x7FFF	Text
  4	40 × 32	320 × 256	2	10	0x5800–0x7FFF	Graphics
  5	20 × 32	160 × 256	4	10	0x5800–0x7FFF	Graphics
  6	40 × 25	320 × 200	2	8	0x6000–0x7FFF	Text
  7 (Teletext)	40 × 25	480 × 500	8	1	0x7C00–0x7FFF	Text
- Four independent sound channels (one noise and three melodic) using the Texas Instruments SN76489 sound chip
- Built-in hardware support included:
  - pluggable ROMs, directly or via cartridge slots
  - floppy disc drives (both DFS and the newer ADFS supported) with WD1770 disc controller
  - tape interface (with motor control), using a variation of the Kansas City standard data encoding scheme
  - parallel printer port (Centronics compatible)
  - serial communication (using RS-423, a superset of RS-232)
  - display output for TV, RGB or 1v p-p video monitor
  - a 15-pin 'D shaped' port with four analogue inputs (suitable for two joysticks, four digital/contact ports (for buttons) and a special Light pen input
  - proprietary "Tube" interface for internal or external second CPU (in the Master 512 model, an 80186 was used; other options included a 3 MHz extra 6502, a Zilog Z80 for e.g. CP/M, an NS32016, an ARM1, and others)
  - a 20-pin IDC style "user port" consisting of eight general purpose digital I/O pins (and two special handshaking ones) mapped directly into the 6522 VIA
  - generic expansion through the "1 MHz bus", and
  - Econet interface, installed by adding a module board and the ANFS ROM (fitted as standard to the Master ET machine)

Several of the inputs were directly wired to specific registers in order to allow the hardware to do some of the heavy lifting. For example, the light-pen input would directly halt a counter which was started by the start of the vertical sweep of each display refresh, making calculation of where the light pen was touching the screen little more than a simple divide/remainder operation. Likewise, the motor control relay for the audio cassette tape was controlled by a simple command and could be readily used in numerous control applications.

== Code page layout (BBC Master microcomputer) ==
This character set was used in the BBC Master microcomputer.

BBC Master microcomputer character set
	0	1	2	3	4	5	6	7	8	9	A	B	C	D	E	F
0x	NUL	SOH	STX	ETX	EOT	ENQ	ACK	BEL	BS	HT	LF	VT	FF	CR	SO	SI
1x	DLE	DC1	DC2	DC3	DC4	NAK	SYN	ETB	CAN	EM	SUB	ESC	FS	GS	RS	US
2x	SP	!	"	#	$	%	&	'	(	)	*	+	,	-	.	/
3x	0	1	2	3	4	5	6	7	8	9	:	;	<	=	>	?
4x	@	A	B	C	D	E	F	G	H	I	J	K	L	M	N	O
5x	P	Q	R	S	T	U	V	W	X	Y	Z	[	\	]		_
6x	£	a	b	c	d	e	f	g	h	i	j	k	l	m	n	o
7x	p	q	r	s	t	u	v	w	x	y	z	{	¦	}	~	DEL
8x	Ä	Å	Æ	Ç	É	Ö	Ü	©	←	→	↓	↑	à	è	ë	ê
9x	ä	å	æ	ç	é	ö	ü	ì	î	ò	ô	ù	û	ÿ	¤	§
Ax	°	╷	╶	┌	╴	┐	─	┬	╵	│	└	├	┘	┤	┴	┼
Bx	╭	╮	╰	╯	¿	¡	Ñ	ñ	†	‡	˙	`	¶	·	√	▒
Cx	Ø	Α	Β	Γ	Δ	Ε	Ζ	Η	Θ	Ι	Κ	Λ	Μ	Ν	Ξ	Ο
Dx	Π	Ρ	Σ	Τ	Υ	Φ	Χ	Ψ	Ω	∇	±	∓	|	‖	∪	∩
Ex	ø	α	β	γ	δ	ε	ζ	η	θ	ι	κ	λ	μ	ν	ξ	ο
Fx	π	ρ	σ	τ	υ	φ	χ	ψ	ω	∂	≃	≡	≤	≠	≥	█
