= Firetrack =

1987 video game

- Developer: Aardvark Software
- Publishers: Electric Dreams Software; Superior Software (Electron)
- Designer: Nick Pelling
- Platforms: Acorn Electron, BBC Micro, Commodore 64
- Release: 1987: BBC, C64; 1989: Electron
- Genre: Scrolling shooter
- Mode: Single-player

Firetrack is a vertically-scrolling shooter programmed by Nick Pelling and released for the BBC Micro and Commodore 64 platforms in 1987 by Electric Dreams Software. It was also ported to the Acorn Electron by Superior Software in 1989 as part of the Play It Again Sam 7 compilation. It resembles the 1984 arcade game Star Force in style and gameplay. The game was technically advanced and very well received by critics.

== Gameplay ==
Firetrack on the BBC Micro showing landscape, explosions and enemies, with player ship to lower left.

The player controls a fighter ship which flies at constant speed and heading over a series of worlds. The player is faced with both airborne enemies (who approach in different attack formations) and ground-based enemies. Destruction of a whole attack wave results in bonus points, and destruction of specific ground targets (such as buildings marked with X) results in bonus points (and an occasional extra life) at the end of each level. Some enemies are indestructible and must be avoided. There are no power-ups, although the rate of fire increases with more challenging levels.

== Development ==
Nick Pelling designed the game and programmed the BBC Micro and Commodore 64 versions which were released in 1987 by Electric Dreams Software. When including the game on the 1989 Play It Again Sam 7 compilation, Superior Software also commissioned a conversion to the Acorn Electron which was carried out by Chris Terran.

On the BBC Micro version, it automatically detects sideways RAM expansion if present, which allows more detailed graphics on the levels, without any changes to the underlying gameplay. Innovative use of colour makes the 8-colour palette of the BBC look much broader. The scrolling is smooth and flicker-free, and there is very little noticeable slowing, even when many enemies are displayed at once. If shadow RAM is present, the graphics are double buffered.

The Acorn Electron version exploits a division in the way the Electron handles its display: of the seven available graphics modes, two are configured so that the final two of every ten scanlines are blank and are not based on the contents of RAM. If 16 scanlines of continuous graphical data are written to a character-block-aligned portion of the screen then they will appear as a continuous block in most modes but in the two non-continuous modes they will be displayed as two blocks of 8 scanlines, separated in the middle by two blank scanlines. In order to keep track of its position within the display, the Electron maintains an internal display address counter. The same counter is used in both the continuous and non-continuous graphics modes and switching modes mid-frame does not cause any adjustment to the counter. Firetrack switches from a non-continuous to a continuous graphics mode partway down the display. By using the palette to mask the top area of the display and taking care about when it changes mode it can shift the continuous graphics at the bottom of the display down in two pixel increments (rather than the usual eight for vertical scrolling) because the internal display counter is not incremented on blank scanlines during non-continuous graphics modes.

== Reception ==
Zzap!64 gave an overall score of 88%, commenting that the game could "truly be said to be of arcade quality" and is "fast, frenetic and extremely playable – easily the best vertically scrolling shoot 'em up to date". Electron User, when reviewing the Play It Again Sam 7 compilation, were also very enthusiastic with reviewer Martin Reed praising the "amazingly smooth vertical-scrolling" and stating that "the graphics are stunning and give an amazingly realistic 3D effect that I wouldn't have thought was possible on the Electron". In her second opinion, Janice Murray claimed it would be worth buying the compilation even if you already owned the other three games: "This technically brilliant piece of programming makes a fine game which proves to be very fast and addictive. The other titles can be considered bonuses thrown in for free".
