= Advanced Disc Filing System =

Computer file ststem

ADFS
- Developer(s): Hugo Tyson, Nick Reeves (Acorn Computers)
- Full name: Advanced Disc Filing System
- Introduced: 1983; 42 years ago with Acorn MOS
- Partition IDs: Hugo or Nick (Directory header/footer)

Structures
- Directory contents: Hierarchical fixed-length tables
- File allocation: One range per file plus table of free-space ranges (L), bitmap with embedded file IDs (E)
- Bad blocks: none (L), marked in bitmap (E)

Limits
- Max volume size: 512 MB
- Max file size: 512 MB
- Max no. of files: 47 per directory (L), 77 per directory (E)
- Max filename length: 10 characters
- Allowed filename characters: ASCII (Acorn MOS), ISO 8859-1 (RISC OS)

Features
- Dates recorded: Modification
- Date range: 1 January 1900 - 3 June 2248
- Date resolution: 10 ms
- Forks: no
- Attributes: Load address, execute address and file cycle number (Acorn MOS); File type and modification time (RISC OS); User read/write/execute-only; public read/write/execute-only; Deletion lock
- File system permissions: None
- Transparent compression: No
- Transparent encryption: No
- Data deduplication: No

Other
- Supported operating systems: Acorn MOS, RISC OS

The Advanced Disc Filing System (ADFS) is a computing file system unique to the Acorn computer range and RISC OS-based successors. Initially based on the rare Acorn Winchester Filing System, it was renamed to the Advanced Disc Filing System when support for floppy discs was added (using a WD1770 floppy disc controller) and on later 32-bit systems a variant of a PC-style floppy controller.

Acorn's original Disc Filing System was limited to 31 files per disk surface, 7 characters per file name and a single character for directory names, a format inherited from the earlier Atom and System 3–5 Eurocard computers. To overcome some of these restrictions Acorn developed ADFS. The most dramatic change was the introduction of a hierarchical directory structure. The filename length increased from 7 to 10 letters and the number of files in a directory expanded to 47. It retained some superficial attributes from DFS; the directory separator continued to be a dot and $ now indicated the hierarchical root of the filesystem. ^ was used to refer to the parent directory, @ the current directory, and \ was the previously visited directory.

The BBC Master Compact contained ADFS version 2.0, which provided the addition of format, verify and backup commands in ROM, but omitted support for hard discs.

== 8-bit usage ==
ADFS on 8-bit systems required a WD1770 or later 1772-series floppy controller, owing to the inability of the original Intel 8271 chip to cope with the double-density format ADFS required. ADFS could however be used to support hard discs without a 1770 controller present; in development the use of hard discs was the primary goal, extension to handle floppies came later. The 1770 floppy controller was directly incorporated into the design of the Master Series and B+ models, and was available as an upgrade board for the earlier Model B. ADFS could be added to Model B and B+ systems with an additional upgrade.

The Acorn Plus 3, Acorn's official disc expansion for the Acorn Electron, was supplied with ADFS as standard, but this implementation featured various notable bugs. A file called ZYSYSHELP was "required by the system" and created during formatting. This was a kludge. Acorn's original ADFS implementation on the Electron was unreliable when writing to the first few tracks of a floppy disc, so this was a "fix" and simply involved writing a file full of garbage to the suspect part. The ADFS would then skip it. Disc corruption could also occur if attempting to use the *COMPACT command without disabling the blinking text cursor. (Note: This was due to the fact that the *COMPACT command used screen memory (by default) as working space during the operation, and the software-implemented blinking cursor corrupted that memory space. An alternative would be to give arguments to make it use non-screen memory for workspace, for example *COMPACT 40 20 in screen mode 6. On the BBC Micro, the blinking cursor, if enabled, was superimposed onto the display output by the 6845 CRTC and Acorn's video ULA, without changing any screen memory. The Acorn Electron did not have this extra hardware and had to alter screen memory in software to blink the cursor.) Hugo Tyson, principal ADFS developer, recalls that this bug was found during late testing but not fixed in the initial ROM release in order to avoid late changes, as workarounds exist.

On the Electron, disc formatting was done via the *EFORM command instead of the established *FORM40/*FORM80 DFS commands. Note additionally that the *EFORM command differs from the equivalent *AFORM command for the 1770 ADFS on the BBC Microcomputer. This is possibly as a result of needing to create the ZYSYSHELP file on the Electron. The *EFORM command was only supplied on the Welcome disc that was shipped with the Plus3, and was not included in the ROM.

ADFS supported hard discs, and 5¼" and 3½" floppy discs formatted up to 640 KB capacity using double density MFM encoding (L format; single-sided disks were supported with the S format (160 KB) and M format (320 KB)). ADFS as implemented in the BBC microcomputer system (and later RISC OS) never had support for single-density floppies.

Hard disc support in ADFS used the same format as L format floppies in terms of 256-byte blocks; only the underlying arrangement of tracks and sectors differed depending on the actual drive used, but this was managed by the SCSI controller. It interfaced to a ST506/ST412-based Winchester unit via the BBC Micro's 1 MHz Bus, an Acorn-designed interface card (1 MHz Bus to SCSI adapter) and an off-the-shelf Adaptec SCSI controller (SCSI to ST-506 adapter).

Support for IDE/ATAPI style drives has been added 'unofficially' by third parties in recent years.

The ADFS file format used the ASCII bytes Hugo to delimit the directory names on the disc, named after ADFS author Hugo Tyson.

== 32-bit usage (Arthur and RISC OS) ==
On 32-bit systems, a WD 1770 or 1772 was initially used as a floppy controller on the early machines of the range. Later models utilised a PC style multi-I/O controller requiring slight changes to ADFS. In addition to legacy support for the 'L'-type format, Arthur and later RISC OS provided enhanced formats which overcome the limitations of the BBC Micro.

Arthur added D format with 77 entries per directory as opposed to the previous 47, also usable on hard discs and a new 800 KB double-density floppy format. A per-file "type" attribute was added in space previously used to store Load and Execute addresses. The 12 bits of type information is used to denote the contents or intended use of a file, typically presented as three hexadecimal digits. This is similar to the 32-bit type attributes stored in Apple's HFS file system, and conceptually comparable to the more general use of MIME Types by the Be Operating System (BeOS), or magic numbers in Unix systems (though the latter is stored as part of the file, not as metadata).

RISC OS brought in E and F format for double-density discs and high-density discs/hard disc drives respectively. These formats support file fragmentation (with the so-called "new map"), storage of multiple files per fragment and storage of small files in directory tables. The allocation strategy is optimised to minimise fragmentation, and sometimes performs defragmentation as part of a file storage operation. RISC OS 4 added E+/F+ format which allowed for long filenames and more than 77 files per directory. More recent versions of RISC OS, including those for Iyonix, continue to provide ADFS, and have further extended it to cope with larger hard disc sizes.

Unlike the 8-bit implementation, ADFS as implemented on RISC OS is not monolithic. A system module called "ADFS" provides no more than the block driver and user interfaces, where the "FileCore" module contains the actual file system implementation, and FileSwitch contains the VFS and high-level file-access API implementations. This allows for other hardware to use the ADFS format easily, such as IDEFS (commonly used for IDE add-on cards), SCSIFS, and the network-aware AppFS. FileCore and FileSwitch's functions are in some ways similar to the IFS and IO system managers in Windows NT. This flexibility has allowed other filing systems to be implemented into RISC OS relatively easily.

== Support for ADFS on other platforms ==
The Linux kernel has ADFS support for E format and later.

NetBSD has filecore support in NetBSD 1.4 onwards.

Tools such as Omniflop (in Windows 2000 and later), and Libdsk support permit the 'physical' layout of ADFS floppies to be read on PC systems utilising an internal drive. However the logical structure remains unimplemented.
