= Acorn Business Computer =

Series of microcomputers by the British company Acorn Computers

- Developer: Acorn Computers
- Manufacturer: Acorn Computers
- Operating system: Panos, Concurrent DOS
- CPU: 6502, Z80, 32016, 80286
- Predecessor: BBC Micro
- Successor: Acorn Archimedes

The Acorn Business Computer (ABC) was a series of microcomputers announced at the end of 1983 by the British company Acorn Computers. The series of eight computers was aimed at the business, research and further education markets. Demonstrated at the Personal Computer World Show in September 1984, having been under development for "about a year" and having been undergoing field trials from May 1984, the range "understandably attracted a great deal of attention" and was favourably received by some commentators. The official launch of the range was scheduled for January 1985.

Acorn had stated in a February 1985 press release that the ABC machines would soon be available in 50 stores, but having been rescued by Olivetti, no dealers were stocking the range and only the Personal Assistant and 300 series models were expected to be on display by the end of March. However, the ABC range was cancelled before any of the models were shipped to customers. The ABC 210 was subsequently relaunched as the Acorn Cambridge Workstation in July 1985, and sold in modest numbers to academic and scientific users.

The ABC range was developed by Acorn essentially as a repackaged BBC Micro, expanded to 64 KB RAM, to which was added (in some models) a second processor and extra memory to complement the Micro's 6502. The electronics and disk drives were integrated into the monitor housing, with a separate keyboard.

The Zilog Z80, Intel 80286 and National Semiconductor 32016 were all used as second processors in the various models. Two of the eight models produced, the Personal Assistant and the Terminal, had no second processor.

== Origins ==
As part of the agreement made between Acorn and the BBC to supply a microcomputer to accompany the BBC Computer Literacy Project, Acorn had committed to deliver a business upgrade for the BBC Micro, with Z80-based computers running the CP/M operating system being the established business platform at that time and thus the likely form of any such upgrade. This upgrade was eventually delivered in 1984 as the Z80 Second Processor, requiring a BBC Micro, dual floppy drives and a display to complete a basic business system for a total cost of around £1500. As such, the bundle was not offered as a single, packaged business computer product, unlike a widening range of competing products that could be obtained at such a price.

Various systems had already been proposed by Acorn early in the life of the BBC Micro before the Acorn Business Computer name had been publicly adopted. For instance, the machine that would eventually be known as the ABC 210 was described in mid-1982 in the context of an apparent deal with National Semiconductor, indicating a 1 MB system with hard disks and "Acorn, Unix or Idris operating systems" at an estimated price of around $3500, with a second processor product for the BBC Micro having only 256 KB RAM. The Gluon concept, offering a 32016 second processor solution for the BBC Micro and other microcomputers, featured prominently in the company's strategy to offer more powerful computing hardware and to provide the basis for more powerful machines.

Meanwhile, the machine that would become known as the ABC 100 was described in mid-1983 as the Acorn Business Machine, being based on the BBC Micro with Z80 Second Processor, twin disk drives, running CP/M, with an anticipated launch the same year and a price of "under £2000". Such a configuration, with a Z80 processor running CP/M assisted by a 6502 processor managing the display and peripherals was already proven by various Torch Computers products - notably the BBC Micro-based C-series (Communicator) - and also featured in machines like the C/WP Cortex.

The successful development of second processor solutions was regarded as an essential progression that would enable Acorn to offer variants of the BBC Micro as business machines and to be able to compete with Torch, whose products were in some ways pursuing such goals. Delays affected the development of these products, however. In late 1983, the launch of the Z80 Second Processor had been estimated as occurring in February 1984, and although the 16032 Second Processor had been demonstrated at an event in Munich, Acorn had not apparently decided on pricing or positioning, describing the product as being "months away". Meanwhile, negotiations between National Semiconductor, Acorn, Logica and Microsoft were ongoing with regard to making Unix - Xenix, specifically - available on "the BBC machine".

== Range and specifications ==
The following models were originally announced in late 1984, with pricing for several models announced in early 1985. Although acknowledging the ABC range as a "repackaging job" of the BBC Model B, the selection of models was itself regarded as "superb" in some of the commentary following the unveiling of the ABC in late 1984. The ABC Personal Assistant was perceived by some to be the BBC Model C expected from Acorn, raising questions about the work that had been done to the BBC Model B hardware and whether such a board, designed for a reduction in chip count and production cost, would eventually see use in the conventional BBC Micro range, bringing lower pricing and higher reliability.

=== ABC Personal Assistant ===
- 64 KB RAM
- 640 KB floppy disk drive
- 6502 processor running at 2 MHz
- 4 MHz RAM bus
- Acornsoft View and Acornsoft ViewSheet in ROM
- Green phosphor monochrome monitor
- Announced price: £999 plus VAT

=== ABC Terminal ===
- 64 KB RAM
- Diskless
- 6502 processor running at 2 MHz
- 4 MHz RAM bus
- VT100 terminal emulator in ROM
- Green phosphor monochrome monitor
- Announced price: £799 plus VAT

=== ABC 100 ===
- 64 KB RAM
- Twin 720 KB floppy disk drives
- Z80 processor (6502 acting as I/O processor)
- CP/M 2.2 operating system
- Green phosphor monochrome monitor
- Announced price: £1599 plus VAT

=== ABC 110 ===
- 64 KB RAM
- 720 KB floppy disk drive
- 10 Megabyte hard drive
- Z80 processor (6502 acting as I/O processor)
- CP/M 2.2 operating system
- Colour monitor
- Announced price: £2999 plus VAT

=== ABC 200 ===
- 512 KB RAM
- 10 MHz or 8 MHz RAM bus (second processor)
- Twin 720 KB floppy disk drives
- 32016 processor (6502 acting as I/O processor)
- Monochrome monitor

=== ABC 210/Acorn Cambridge Workstation ===
Cambridge Workstation advert in New Scientist, 24 April 1986 issue

This model, providing a hard disk, entered production as the Acorn Cambridge Workstation (ACW 443).

- Up to 1 MB RAM on the ABC 210; up to 4 MB RAM on the ACW
- 10 MHz or 8 MHz RAM bus (second processor)
- 720 KB floppy disk drive
- 10 MB hard disk on the ABC 210; 20 MB hard disk on the ACW
- 32016 processor (6502 acting as I/O processor)
- 32016 firmware (Pandora) in ROM. The ABC 210 was intended to run Xenix; however, the ACW was shipped with Panos.
- Colour monitor
- Announced price (as Acorn Cambridge Workstation): £5,845 for 1 MB model with RAM upgrades at £1,000 per megabyte; £3,595 for 1 MB diskless model, £7,895 for 4 MB model with 20 MB hard disk

The reason given for providing Panos as the operating system at the launch of the Acorn Cambridge Workstation instead of Xenix, despite Acorn having contracted Logica to port Xenix to the machine, was the apparent lack of a working memory management unit (MMU) in the National Semiconductor 32016 chipset, for which a socket was provided on the machine's processor board. Thus, the machine was delivered with only the 32016 CPU, 32081 FPU (Floating Point Unit), and the 32201 TCU (Timing and Control Unit) fitted as standard. Such problems with the 32082 MMU had been noted with regard to hardware workarounds adopted in the design of the Whitechapel MG-1 workstation (a somewhat higher-specification product than Acorn's offerings that initially provided National Semiconductor's own Unix variant, Genix, instead of Xenix). Logica had announced general availability of Xenix 3.0 for the 32000 series, featuring "full demand paging virtual memory", for May 1984, and 32032-based systems running Xenix reportedly became available.

Four models were originally planned for launch in the Acorn Cambridge Workstation range: the ACW 100, ACW 121 and ACW 143 being models with 1 MB of RAM (expandable to 4 MB except for the ACW 100), the ACW 443 having 4 MB of RAM; the ACW 143 and ACW 443 offering hard drive storage. A range of languages were bundled as standard, with Acorn emphasising the productivity benefits of having a 32-bit desktop computer with "the computational performance of a super-minicomputer", providing the result of an in-house benchmark test against a VAX 11/750 running 4.2BSD, both in single-user mode and in "typical heavily loaded" multi-user mode, to illustrate and reinforce the message that such a computer could "take the strain off an overloaded super-minicomputer".

Queen Mary College was a significant purchaser of Acorn's related 32016 second processor product, having reportedly acquired "no less than 80 of the 300 machines Acorn has sold" by mid-1986. While certain users benefited from a single-user workstation in the way emphasised by Acorn's advertising, specifically that an individual could dedicate their machine to a task and see it completed sooner than the same task queued for execution on a much faster mainframe or supercomputer, Acorn's product saw numerous problems when introduced to a broader audience at the institution. Despite a fairly varied range of programming language products being available for the machine's Panos environment - 32016 assembly language, BASIC, BCPL, Fortran, Lisp, Pascal - mostly giving the impression of being "top-notch" implementations, other kinds of applications were more scarce or suffered from performance issues. System and network reliability proved to be a significant problem in the teaching environment, although the introduction of Panos 1.3 improved the situation "markedly".

One academic project struggled with "the initial unreliability and unsuitability of the Acorn workstation as a development machine", reporting slow program build times and the lack of debugging tools that led to other systems being used to develop software for the machine, also experiencing "apparently random faults" with the hardware and systems software that impacted the project for 15 months. Acorn's earlier positioning of this system as a CAD workstation failed to keep up with user expectations, with the BBC Micro architecture offering an insufficiently high screen resolution and with the system not being provided with mouse or trackball, these contributing to perceptions of it being "less than ideal for Computer Aided Design".

=== ABC 300 ===
- 1024 KB RAM
- Twin 720 KB floppy disk drives
- 80286 processor (6502 acting as I/O processor)
- Concurrent DOS 286 with Desktop Manager (GEM GUI) available separately
- Monochrome monitor
- Announced price: £2599 plus VAT

Some confusion arose when the range was first shown, with commentators given the impression that the graphical environment had been developed by Acorn. It was subsequently noted that Acorn and Digital Research had apparently conspired to leave such an impression because the Digital Research product itself was still "secret at the time Acorn decided to show it". Although impressed by the potential of the machine, offering support for running four applications concurrently, including traditional DOS applications, by using the protected mode of the 80286 and relying on the "host" 6502 at the core of the ABC architecture to handle the display needs of each application, skepticism was expressed at Acorn's likely pricing and the company's ability to deliver the product by a rumoured release date of March 1985.

=== ABC 310 ===
- 1024 KB RAM
- 720 KB floppy disk drive
- 10 Megabyte hard disk
- 80286 processor (6502 acting as I/O processor)
- Concurrent DOS 286 with Desktop Manager (GEM GUI) supplied
- Colour monitor
- Announced price: £3999 plus VAT

== Legacy ==
Although most of the ABC models failed to reach the market in their original form, particularly after Olivetti's rescue of Acorn, several of the concepts were revisited in the BBC Master series of microcomputers. Like the ABC Personal Assistant, the Master 128 offers more memory than the original BBC Micro and includes the View and ViewSheet productivity software on board. The Master Econet Terminal, like the ABC Terminal, emphasises network access and a lack of on-board software and local storage. Meanwhile, the Master Scientific was intended to offer some continuity with the 32016-based second processor solution provided by the Acorn Cambridge Workstation, and the Master 512 offers a 80186-based second processor with DOS Plus and GEM support, thus resembling the ABC 300 series in particular ways. However, none of the Master series features an integrated display, which had been criticised in some reviews of the ABC series. Around two years after the unveiling of the ABC range, the Master Compact eventually introduced the practice of bundling a display and storage into Acorn's traditional product range.

Whereas the different models in the ABC range were combinations of a "host" computer based on the BBC Micro and a second processor fitted inside the display unit, the equivalent Master-series variants were generally accommodated by plug-in coprocessor cards fitted inside a Master 128 or Master Econet Terminal (ET), these models being the foundation of the range. It was therefore possible to acquire and upgrade the Master 128 or ET to one of the other models by installing the appropriate coprocessor card, and unlike the ABC whose models could be purchased as complete systems, only the Master 128 and ET were offered by Acorn as systems with the coprocessors offered separately as "modules" to realise the desired variants.

A more direct legacy of the range concerns the BBC Model B+ whose motherboard has its origin as the BBC Micro "host" found in the different ABC models: a design using 64-kilobit RAM chips, an updated disk controller, and support for shadow RAM. Given perceptions of one ABC model as the BBC Model C, the Model B+ could be regarded as delivering the basis of that widely expected model. Having successfully pursued a similar strategy to that of the Acorn Business Computer, Torch were said to be "actively evaluating the B+ motherboard", having used the previous BBC Micro motherboard as the basis of the company's earlier products. Torch's own Graduate product had been noted as potentially filling a gap within the ABC range, this being the "big jump" from the Z80-based ABC 100 systems to the 80286-based ABC 300 models.

The 1982 vision of microcomputers acting as terminals to a "Universal Gluon" expansion did eventually come to pass through the availability of a number of third-party expansions for the BBC Micro such as the Cambridge Microprocessor Systems 68000 second processor, Flight Electronics 68000 processor board, and the Micro Developments MD512k Universal Second Processor System. Meanwhile, various companies pursued the development of Tube-based second processor solutions involving the 68000, neglected by Acorn in its own offerings, such as the CA Special Products Casper board and the HDP68K board featured in the Torch Computers Unicorn, the latter offering the Unix support never delivered for Acorn's 32016-based systems. The Torch Unicorn was perhaps the clearest realisation of the broader "Universal Gluon" concept, effectively coupling a BBC Micro with a more powerful computing system.

Initially mentioned as a "CAD graphics workstation based on the 16032 chip" in October 1983, and presumably following on from work done by Acorn related to the design of the ULA components in its products, the Acorn Cambridge Workstation formed the hardware basis of a chip design product by Qudos called Quickchip, "a comprehensive CAD package for semi-custom gate arrays... supported by a high speed direct write electron beam fabrication facility", used by custom semiconductor product designers such as Flare Technology and promoted by the UK's Department of Trade and Industry. A related product was apparently produced by Qudos for the BBC Master Turbo or BBC Micro with 6502 second processor expansion, offering design support for custom gate arrays of "up to around 300 gates in size" based on Ferranti ULA technology. Quickchip was subsequently ported to the Acorn Archimedes, with the software having previously been "running on powerful Unix workstations". Although the smaller-scale Minichip solution ran on a BBC Micro-based system with 6502 coprocessor, and was also released for the Archimedes, the Unix-based Quickchip solution apparently ran on Vax systems running Ultrix.

Having promised some kind of Unix product as early as 1982, Acorn eventually released a Unix workstation in 1989 based on the Archimedes hardware platform, followed up by other models in 1990. Instead of Xenix, these workstations ran RISC iX: a port of 4.3BSD Unix to the ARM architecture.

Despite the ABC 300 series embracing compatibility with the IBM PC world, Acorn would subsequently mostly avoid selling dedicated PC compatibles, with the Acorn M19 - a rebadged Olivetti M19 - appearing in the product range for a short period in the mid-1980s. Beyond the Master 512, the Archimedes range was initially intended to support a similar second processor expansion, but PC support on the Archimedes range initially focused on software emulation with the PC Emulator product. Eventually, hardware expansions from Aleph One provided the envisaged second processor capabilities, these being sold by Acorn in some configurations for certain models. Acorn would go on to emphasise PC compatibility with the Archimedes' successor, the Risc PC, with its architecture supporting a plug-in Intel-compatible CPU alongside the main ARM processor. Eventually yielding to demands for dedicated PC-compatible systems, Acorn announced Pentium-based systems in 1996 for administrative use in educational establishments, although these models would eventually become available via Xemplar Education - Acorn's educational joint venture with Apple - and not Acorn itself.

== Notes ==
- "Chris's Acorns: Acorn Business Computer".
- "Chris's Acorns: Acorn Cambridge Workstation".
- Bright, Peter (April 1985). "Acorn ABC 310" (PDF). Personal Computer World. 8 (4).
- Attack, Carol (October 1988). "From Atom to ARC". Acorn User.
- Attack, Carol (November 1988). "From Boom to Bust". Acorn User.
- Attack, Carol (December 1988). "Back from the Brink". Acorn User.
- "Full Acorn Machine List", Philip R. Banks, 1999
