= ViewSheet =

- Original author(s): Mark Colton
- Developer(s): Acornsoft
- Initial release: 1984
- Platform: BBC Micro, Acorn Electron
- Type: Spreadsheet
- License: Proprietary

ViewSheet is a spreadsheet program produced in the 1980s by Acornsoft for use with the BBC Micro and Acorn Electron microcomputers. It was distributed as a pre-installed ROM with some computer models, such as the Master. ViewSheet was written by Mark Colton.

== Description ==
ViewSheet supports spreadsheets of up to 255 by 255 cells in size. Each cell can contain a number, formula or text label. Cells are referred to as slots in the official Acornsoft documentation. The program is supplied with a keyboard card listing the various commands, which on the BBC Micro is placed under the clear plastic strip above the function keys.

The spreadsheet is entered by typing *SHEET. All BBC Micro screen modes are supported, and the background and foreground colours can be changed by use of Ctrl-S,n,n,0,0,0 key sequences.

The program supports user-defined windows that can display cells from various different parts of the spreadsheet within the same screen. This is useful in lieu of a WIMP environment, as it saves the user the inconvenience of moving back and forth around the spreadsheet to view cells which are far apart from each other.

ViewSheet supports saving of spreadsheets to both disk and tape and printing to both serial and parallel printers. These operations are performed in command mode, which also allows changing various options such as VDU settings and screen resolution. The program also integrates with Acornsoft's View word processor, allowing mixing of spreadsheet data and word processor text within the same printout. There's also a built-in facility for generating character-based bar charts.

Cells can be left or right justified and formatted according to a user specified layout. Numeric values are stored internally as five-byte floating point numbers. The ViewSheet file format is documented on page 128 of the supplied user guide, which also contains an example BBC BASIC program to print out values from a saved spreadsheet.

ViewSheet takes advantage of a second 6502 processor, which triples the amount of memory available for spreadsheets, assuming the default screen mode is used (mode 3).

== Critical reception ==
ViewSheet was reviewed by Gordon Taylor in the January 1985 edition of A&B computing and a book ViewSheet and Viewstore: A Dabhand Guide by Graham Bell was published by Dabs Press in 1989.

David Brown, in his review for The Micro User states that ViewSheet "succeeds in providing all the basic spreadsheet functions in a well presented package". Although, he also cites several shortcomings of the program, writing "In conclusion, Viewsheet's major failing is to provide adequate facilities for textual labelling." and finishes by noting "Acornsoft is capable of producing better programs".
