= Watford Electronics =

- Industry: Computer hardware
- Founded: 1972
- Founders: Nazir Jessa; Raza Jessa
- Defunct: 2007
- Fate: Entered administration
- Successor: Saverstore
- Products: Microcomputers; Computer peripherals
- Brands: Aries

Watford Electronics was a British computer electronics company. It was founded in 1972 in a bedroom belonging to brothers Nazir and Raza Jessa, and grew to become one of the best-known suppliers of microcomputers and micro peripherals during the 1980s.

In the 1970s Watford Electronics sold components and kits, through advertising in electronics magazines, and a paper catalogue. They had one shop in Watford, but mostly traded as a mail-order company.

In the early 1980s Watford Electronics expanded into the home computer market. It was particularly active in the BBC Micro scene, producing a variety of peripherals for the computer, as well as a version of the Disc Filing System. They sold their own hardware under the Aries brand. Watford Electronics gradually moved over to supporting the Wintel market in the 1990s. In the 21st century, the company opened an online store, Savastore, but in 2007 Watford collapsed into administration. Watford Electronics was then bought out by Globally Limited, and in April that year, the website became known as Saverstore.
