= Disc Filing System =

Computer file system

DFS
- Developer: Acorn Computers
- Full name: Disc Filing System
- Introduced: 1982; 44 years ago with Acorn MOS
- Partition IDs: None

Structures
- Directory contents: Single catalogue of 31 fixed length records
- File allocation: Start-Length entries
- Bad blocks: None

Limits
- Max volume size: 256 KB
- Max file size: 255½ KB
- Max no. of files: 31
- Max filename length: 7 characters
- Allowed filename characters: ASCII

Features
- Dates recorded: None
- Date range: N/A
- Forks: No
- Attributes: Directory character, Load address, Execution address, Locked
- File system permissions: No
- Transparent compression: No
- Transparent encryption: No

Other
- Supported operating systems: Acorn MOS

The Disc Filing System (DFS) is a computer file system developed by Acorn Computers, initially as an add-on to the Eurocard-based Acorn System 2.

In 1981, the Education Departments of Western Australia and South Australia announced joint tenders calling for the supply of personal computers to their schools. Acorn's Australian computer distributor, Barson Computers, convinced Joint Managing Directors Hermann Hauser and Chris Curry to allow the soon to be released Acorn BBC Microcomputer to be offered with disk storage as part of the bundle. They agreed on condition that Barson adapted the Acorn DFS from the System 2 without assistance from Acorn as they had no resources available. This required some minor hardware and software changes to make the DFS compatible with the BBC Micro.

Barson won the tenders for both states, with the DFS fitted, a year ahead of the UK. It was this early initiative that resulted in the BBC Micro being more heavily focused on the education market in Australia, with very little penetration of the home computer market until the arrival of the Acorn Electron.

The DFS shipped as a ROM and Disk Controller Chip fitted to the BBC Micro's motherboard. The filing system was of extremely limited functionality and storage capability, using a flat directory structure. Each filename can be up to seven letters long, plus one letter for the directory in which the file is stored.

The DFS is remarkable in that unlike most filing systems, there was no single vendor or implementation. The original DFS was written by Acorn, who continued to maintain their own codebase, but various disc drive vendors wrote their own implementations. Companies who wrote their own DFS implementations included Cumana, Solidisk, Opus and Watford Electronics. The Watford Electronics implementation is notable for supporting 62 files per disc instead of the usual 31, using a non-standard disc format. Beyond that, the Solidisk implementation introduced proprietary "chained" catalogues which allowed unlimited files per disc (only constrained by the disk size). Other features in third-party implementations included being able to review free space, and built-in FORMAT and VERIFY commands, which were shipped on a utility disc with the original Acorn DFS.

Acorn followed up their original DFS series with the Acorn 1770 DFS, which used the same disc format as the earlier version but added a set of extra commands and supported the improved WD1770 floppy drive controller chip.

== Physical format ==
DFS conventionally uses one side of a double-density 5¼" floppy disc. Discs are formatted as either 40 or 80 track, giving a capacity of 100 or 200 KB per side (ten 256-byte sectors per track, with FM encoding).

The capacity is limited by the choice of the Intel 8271 controller in the original BBC Micro, which only supports FM encoding, not the MFM encoding which was already in common use by the time of the BBC Micro's launch. FM encoding gives half the recording capacity of MFM for a given physical disc density.

FM and MFM encoding are commonly referred to as "single density" and "double density", although the discs and drives are the same, unlike "high density", which uses different drives and discs.

Double-density 3½" discs can be formatted and used with 1770 DFS (the Intel 8271-based DFS has problems with many 3½" drives), giving the same "single-density" capacity with FM encoding, but this was not originally standard practice. 3½" discs were normally formatted as MFM "double density" using the later Advanced Disc Filing System, as this is present in all Acorn machines supplied with 3½" drives. As of 2009, 3½" drives are more commonly used with BBC Micros than in the past, including use with DFS, due to their greater availability and easier data interchange with more recent computers.

High-density 5¼" and 3½" discs are not supported by DFS.

=== Single- and double-sided operation ===
The DFS does not directly support double-sided discs; instead, the two heads of a double-sided drive are treated as two separate logical drives. The DFS can support up to four volumes, numbered from 0 to 3. Drive 0 is the default with drive 1 representing a second drive attached to the cable. "Drive" 2 referred to the reverse side of drive 0, and "drive" 3 was the reverse of drive 1. There is no support for more than two physical drives.

Due to the installed base of single-sided drives, commercial software was normally provided on single-sided discs, or as "flippy discs" that were manually reversed to access the other side.

=== 40- and 80-track compatibility ===
Discs can be formatted using 40 or 80 tracks, using the *FORM40 or *FORM80 commands, and drives can be either 40 or 80 track. This is the most common compatibility issue for DFS users: 40-track discs were the norm for commercial software distribution, due to the installed base of 40-track drives, but 80-track drives became more common as prices dropped, allowing users to store more data. An 80-track drive will not automatically read 40-track discs.

The disc capacity is stored as a sector count in the catalogue on track zero. Track zero is located in the same place on both 40- and 80-track discs, allowing a disc file system to set the motor stepping accordingly. However, the Intel 8271-based Acorn DFS does not do so, and so dual-format capability was addressed in a number of ways:

- by simply attaching both a 40-track drive and an 80-track drive to the BBC Micro, although this was costly for the home user;
- some disc drive resellers, notably UFD (User Friendly Devices) and Akhter Computer Group, offered drive assemblies fitted with switches to select 40- or 80-track operation;
- magazines such as The Micro User offered kits to build circuit boards that could be wired into the disc drive cable, optionally 'double-stepping' the attached drives;
- The Micro User also published an article on creating dual-format discs, with 21 tracks' worth of data stored in both formats so that either type of drive could access the contents; however these had limited capacity and once created were read-only;
- Acorn User magazine distributed 40-track cover discs with a small utility program on track zero, so that owners of 80-track drives could reformat them into 80-track discs with the original contents on the first 40 tracks; or
- the user could upgrade to a WD1770 or similar controller. Acorn 1770 DFS and some third-party controller systems provided dual-format capability in software by reprogramming the controller during track seeks; as a bonus, third-party systems offered proprietary MFM (so-called "double-density") formats for even greater disc capacity.

Failure to use the correct setting would result in errors from the DFS such as Disk fault 18 at 01/00, or damage to the disc drive by trying to step the heads beyond the physical end of the disc surface.

Switching to 80 tracks did not extend the catalogue in any way, leaving the user prone to running out of filename slots before running out of space on the disc. This situation resulted in a Cat full error.

== File storage ==
=== Filenames ===
DFS is case-preserving but not case-sensitive. The prevalence of all-capitals filenames is most likely due to the BBC Micro defaulting to caps lock being enabled after a hard or soft reset. The character set is quite permissive, and all printable characters of 7-bit ASCII are allowed, including spaces, but excluding:

- The single wildcard character #.
- The multiple wildcard character *.
- Control codes generated by the shell escape character |, although the sequence || can be used to represent a single | character in the filename.
- The drive specifier character : as the first character of a leaf name (the file's name proper). This causes a Bad drive or Bad name error. Where the colon is unambiguous, for example in FOO:BAR, then it is allowed as part of the leaf name.
- The directory specifier character . as the first or second character of a leaf name. . cannot be used as a directory character. Where the dot is unambiguous, such as in PRG.BAS, then it is allowed as part of the leaf name, and is not treated as a directory specifier (whereas F.MONEY would be a file MONEY in directory F).

For the sake of portability to third-party DFS implementations, it is best to avoid : and . in leaf names.

Quotation marks are allowed, although BBC BASIC requires them to be escaped twice:

- SAVE """""""A""" passes the string """A" to the DFS, which then saves a file named "A.
- Conversely SAVE "A""" saves a file named A".
- The same technique is used to insert spaces: SAVE """B A R""" saves a file named B A R.

A fully qualified filename, or "file specification" ("fsp" for short) contains a colon then the drive number, a dot, then the directory letter, another dot, and the name. For example, a file in the default directory of "drive" 2 called BOB would have a complete specification of :2.$.BOB. The drive and directory specifiers are both optional.

=== Directories ===
"Directories" in the DFS are single character prefixes on filenames - such as F in F.BankLtr - used to group files. The arrangement is flat and a default directory of $ is used instead of a root directory. On requesting a catalogue of the disc (with the *CAT or *. commands), files in the current directory are shown with no directory prefix in one block, and below that are listed all other files in a second block, with their directory prefixes visible. For example, (from Acorn DFS - third party DFS implementations may vary slightly):

PROGRAM (12)
Drive 0             Option 2 (RUN)
Dir. :0.$           Lib. :0.$

    !BOOT               HELLO
    SUMS                TABLE
    TEST                VECTORS
    ZOMBIE

  A.HELLO   L         B.SUMS
  F.BankLtr

The top seven files are all in the current directory which is $ on drive 0. Below that are all the files in other directories, in this case A, B and F. An L after a filename (as with A.HELLO, above) shows the file is locked against modification or deletion. The first line contains the disc title and the modification count.

The DFS provides a working space, divided up into the directory and the library. The "directory" is the working directory on the current volume, much like the working directory on any other command line system. The "library" is a second, alternative working directory that functions more like PATH and had the benefit of being able to be on any volume. Requests to open files with unqualified names, will first be searched for in the working directory; failing this, the library directory will also be searched. The directory and library both default to the same directory.

== Disc structure ==
The catalogue (file table) occupies the first two disc sectors: one for the names and directories of each file, and a matching sector holding the file locations, sizes and metadata. Eight bytes of each sector are used for each file. With a further eight bytes from each sector reserved for the 12-byte disc title and the volume information, the total number of files on the disc (irrespective of which directory each file is in) is limited to 31. In the interests of saving space, the most significant bit of the directory letter for a file is used as the locked (read-only) flag.

=== Volume size ===
Although physical disks are usually formatted as either 100 KB or 200 KB, DFS supports volume sizes up to 256 KB.

The largest DFS file size allowed is the volume size minus ½ KB for the catalogue, as file sizes are stored as an 18-bit quantity.

=== File allocation ===
The DFS does not support data fragmentation, meaning a file's data must be stored in a single run of consecutive sectors, but free space is prone to becoming fragmented. Random-access file writes fail when the end of the file reaches the beginning of the next, even though there may be free sectors elsewhere on the disc. In such cases the DFS aborts with a Can't extend error. SAVE is also unable to split a file to fit the available space, but as the failure occurs at the sector allocation stage, the error returned is Disk full.

The *COMPACT command is provided to relocate all files on disc to a solid block, placing all the free space after it in a second block. This allows the next file created to fill the disc, but only the last existing file can be extended without being moved. SAVE deletes any existing file and copies the specified block of memory to wherever there is space on the disc. In contrast the *COMPACT command uses program memory as a buffer to relocate the files, overwriting any program and data in memory.

=== Metadata ===
Like the cassette filing system, the Acorn DFS supports the BBC Micro's standard file metadata: load address and execution address, required because Acorn MOS (the operating system used by the BBC Micro) does not support relocation of binary code. A file should be loaded to the address the programmer intended, as the contents may refer to internal locations by absolute addresses. An execution address is also recorded as the entry point is not necessarily at the beginning, or even within the file.

File attributes are limited to a single bit: Locked. When set, an L appears to the right of the file's name in the catalogue and the file may not be altered, overwritten or deleted.

=== Dates ===
DFS discs do not track any dates (because Acorn MOS prior to version 3 did not maintain a real-time clock) but instead offer a peculiar feature: a modification count. Every time the catalogue is updated, the count increments. The count is shown in parentheses after the title in the first line of the disc catalogue, such as the 12 in the catalogue listing shown earlier.

== Other features ==
The DFS also supports a means to start up disc software based on a key sequence. If the shift key is held while the machine is soft or hard reset, the DFS checks drive 0 for a disc containing a positive boot flag. The boot flag is either 0 (ignore), 1 (load file), 2 (run machine code file) or 3 ("execute" script). If the boot flag is positive, a file called $.!BOOT is looked for and loaded into memory (1), loaded and executed as machine code (2) or fed into the keyboard buffer (3). Option 3 reads "EXEC" files, text macro files used as primitive shell scripts. These are not true shell scripts but simply a series of keys to be typed, like a recording to play back. Thus, they cannot loop or branch unless they input such code into the BASIC interpreter. As well as being used during a reset, they can be executed at any time with the operating system's *EXEC command. EXEC files are file system independent.

== Alternatives ==
There was a variant of the DFS called the DNFS, or Disc/Network Filing System, that contained the Econet Network Filing System (NFS), standard Disc Filing System and Tube co-processor support software on a single ROM; this ROM installed two filing systems into the OS at once.

The initial design for the DFS was based around an Intel Corporation FDC 8271 disc drive controller, the immediate predecessor of the 8272 design found in the IBM Personal Computer. The 8271 controller was of limited functionality and obsolete, and later versions of the file system from various vendors including Solidisk, Acorn and Watford Electronics were based on the later WD1770 and WD1772 drive controllers. The 1770 controller quickly became the standard controller in the Acorn range following the advent of ADFS.

The DFS was superseded by the Advanced Disc Filing System (ADFS) which was fully hierarchical and was suitable for running hard drives on the BBC Micro. The ADFS was the default filing system on the BBC Master but most users are likely to have reverted to the DFS for compatibility reasons; ADFS could not read DFS discs. The ADFS was also chosen as the standard filing system for RISC OS.
