= Torch Computers =

British computer hardware company

Torch Computers Ltd was a computer hardware company with origins in a 1982 joint venture between Acorn Computers and Climar Group that led to the development of the Communicator or C-series computer, a system based on the BBC Micro with a Z80 second processor and integral modem, intended as a viewdata terminal.

Establishing itself in Great Shelford, near Cambridge, UK, the company became well known for its computer peripherals for the VIC-20 and BBC Micro. Torch produced an expansion unit originally developed by Arfon Microelectronics for the VIC-20, having acquired Arfon, and several second processor units for the BBC Micro, many with integrated floppy disk or hard disk drives.

== History ==
=== Arfon acquisition and financing ===
Arfon Microelectronics was a producer of a cartridge expansion system for the VIC-20 and a speech generator expansion for the VIC-20 and other microcomputers. Arfon had been founded by Kerr Borland, former North American Semi managing director, in Caernarfon, North Wales, around the end of 1980 with assistance from the Welsh Development Agency.

Towards the end of 1982, Torch acquired the assets of Arfon, taking on some of the "defunct" company's staff. This deal secured a reported quarter of a million pound investment from the Welsh Development Agency. Other shareholders included Newmarket (Venture Capital) and Bell Nominees.

=== GEC acquisition plans and refinancing ===
During 1983, Torch had been set to be acquired by GEC in a deal that would have initially involved a £3.25 million payment covering the acquisition of 76 percent of the company from its existing shareholders as well as providing additional product development and manufacturing finance. GEC had sought to own Torch entirely and to incorporate it within its own operations as a subsidiary, but such plans met opposition from Torch and its employees who had prized the "young, independent and innovative" nature of the company. With the abandonment of this acquisition, the company was refinanced by its shareholders for £1 million and two of its directors resigned, one of them being founder Martin Vlieland-Boddy who later established a company called Data Technologies, developing the product that would eventually be sold by Torch as the Graduate.

=== Acorn Computers acquisition plans ===
In 1984, Acorn Computers announced an initial agreement to acquire Torch, apparently initiated by discussions from August 1983 on Torch's plans to sell Unix-based products and the potential for cooperation in selling into the US market. The takeover was supposed to have been finalised by June 1984, with Torch effectively becoming "effectively the business arm" of Acorn. Acorn and Torch had previously had "close ties" with plans for Torch to be "the business arm" of Acorn, but policy disagreements had led to the relationship being limited to Acorn supplying BBC Micro boards to Torch under contract for products such as the C-series.

Commentators noted the duplication between Acorn and Torch product lines post-acquisition in areas such as second processors (with 6000 of Torch's Z80 disc packs having been sold before Acorn's Z80 second processor had launched and with Torch already offering the HDP68K second processor product in competition to the then-unreleased Acorn 32016 second processor), hard disk systems and networking (with Torchnet being "an expansion of Acorn's Econet"). Nevertheless, Torch chairman Bob Gilkes noted "an exceptionally high degree of compatibility in products, in strategic thinking and in management style", whereas Acorn director Alex Reid indicated that "a rationalisation of the two companies' development efforts" would give a "substantial boost" to both companies' prospects. Torch was to retain its name and operate as a separate entity within Acorn. Subsequently, Gilkes was reported to have been replaced with Acorn's sales director, Peter O'Keefe, as chairman and managing director of Torch after complaints were made by Acorn to Torch's then-owners, Newmarket Venture Capital, about Gilkes' decision to manufacture and market the Graduate product from Data Technologies, this decision having been seen to be in conflict with Acorn's own strategy.

Evidently, the takeover was never completed, with Torch reported to have pulled out of the merger as Acorn's financial situation appeared to deteriorate, the reported £5 million deal being abandoned due to a "divergence of their future plans". By the time of the introduction of the BBC Model B+ in 1985, reportedly being "actively evaluated" by Torch for future products, Torch was described in one review as being "the largest third-party supplier of peripherals for the BBC Micro". Torch would later offer new firmware for its BBC Micro expansions, making them compatible with the BBC Master series, and also feature the Master 128 in its advertising. Despite Acorn's situation, Torch continued to promote the Graduate as "the ultimate upgrade" for the BBC Micro, signing a deal with computer retailer Lasky's to make the product available in its stores.

=== Unix workstation vendor ===
In 1986, Torch introduced the Triple X workstation, based on the Motorola 68010 processor running Uniplus+ Unix System V with 1 MB RAM, 20 MB (or 40 MB) hard disk, 720 KB floppy drive, supporting Ethernet and X25 networking. Unlike previous products, it was not based on the BBC Micro but did provide a 1 MHz bus connector. Launched in January 1986 and aimed at the same market as the AT&T UNIX PC, a number of these were sold but never reached critical mass, and the Triple X was overshadowed in the market by other vendors such as Sun Microsystems, leaving an "installed base" of around 1,200 machines, including its successor, by 1990.

Having 50 employees and a turnover of £3.5 million in 1987, but with an estimated £3 million, two-year contract with British Telecom having "dried up" after only one year, Torch sought refinancing to bring its Quad X workstation to market. This refinancing came in the form of Torch's Australian distributor and customer, Catsco, taking a majority shareholding in the company, augmented with additional funds from Newmarket Venture Capital. In 1988, Torch introduced the Quad X, based on the Motorola 68020.

Some of the software technology used in Torch's workstations was licensed to NeXT, although apparently not used in any of NeXT's own products. IXI Limited, founded by Torch's Ray Anderson, developed the general approach further with its X.desktop product that was ultimately licensed by workstation vendors. Acorn, having entered the Unix workstation market with the RISC iX-based R140 workstation (and having partnered with Torch and other companies in a general UK-based collaboration around the X Window System), apparently recruited industry marketing manager Warwick Hirst from Torch, where in his role as marketing manager he had "specialised in selling Unix systems based on Torch Triple X and Quad X machines to both government and industry".

=== Sale of assets ===
Torch's ownership arrangement continued until 1990 when Catsco declined to provide additional funding to the somewhat diminished, 30-employee company, with Torch's turnover having dropped to £1.5 million, largely reliant on its workstation and other hardware products. The company sought to complete development of a 68030-based QY product for use in products including a low-end £5,500 workstation known as the Torchstation.

In 1990, parts of the company were sold to various buyers. Unipalm acquired the graphical user interface and X Window System products of Torch, with the latter being of particular commercial interest. Two companies of the Cube Group in Cambridge obtained Torch's workstation and VME board products: Cube i.t. took on 15 former Torch employees and hardware development, also continuing to supply the workstation range; Control Universal were to market the VME boards.

In 1991, Control Universal also went into receivership, and its Torch assets were bought by Worldmark Computers Ltd, which then started to trade under the name Torch Computers, changing its name to Torch Computers Ltd. in 1999. Some Quad X boards obtained by Worldmark were sold but the company concentrated on PC technology and began to specialise in small form-factor computers. The main emphasis is now on enclosure products and large LCD displays for digital signage and art installations.

== Products ==
The company provided a range of expansions for the BBC Micro under the Unicorn brand, although this name was also applied to a particular variant of the HDP68K product. The Z80-based products including the HDP68K were bundled with the Perfect suite of applications to run under Torch's CPN operating system (a clone of CP/M). The UCSD p-System was also offered as an option for the Unicorn range. The Torch Graduate was a separate development aimed at the MS-DOS market. Later, various Unix workstation products were released or planned, most notably the Torch Triple X.

Although Torch acquired Arfon, a producer of expansions for the VIC-20, the company reportedly ceased support for this range in 1983.

=== C-Series (Communicator) ===
Initially referred to by reviewers (and perhaps even by its manufacturer) simply as the Torch, the Communicator or C-series was a combination of BBC Micro with Z80 second processor running the CP/M-compatible CPN, modem and disk storage, also providing many of the ports familiar from the BBC Micro including RGB and UHF video outputs, RS-423 serial and Centronics parallel ports, analogue port, a cassette port, and an Econet/Torchnet port.

In a 1983 review of the BBC Micro and Torch Communicator by a US publication, the Communicator was described as "an assembly of all the desirable options connected to a BBC Computer" and "the best illustration of the BBC Computer’s potential". The $6,500 price was regarded as competitive given the features provided, with the dual processor architecture, the additional memory available to the CP/M-compatible environment, and particularly the connectivity features (Prestel and Torchmail) attracting enthusiastic commentary.

To augment the existing capabilities of the Communicator and 700 series models running CPN, Torch released a program called Torch Mail Plus, this offering electronic mail facilities along with file transfer, short message sending and remote login support between Torch machines via the telephone network. A variety of automation features were provided including the ability to schedule operations at certain times, with a scripting language called Tobey used to describe operations to be executed on local or remote machines, this potentially making it possible to coordinate activities performed across a number of different systems. The package was priced at £690 and described by one reviewer as potentially having the same impact for sales of Torch systems as VisiCalc had achieved for Apple systems. A typesetting solution called Torchset was marketed by a company known as Torchset Systems, based on "a single Torch CF500 computer with a customised keyboard", supporting the Cora 5 language devised for Linotron typesetters. Pricing for this solution started at £5500, with multiple computer systems based on Torchnet also available.

The C-500 models provided the base 6502-based BBC system augmented with a Z80A second processor having its own 64 KB RAM, whereas the C-68000 models upgraded the Z80 CPU to a Z80B device and added a Motorola 68000 CPU plus 256 KB RAM, supporting the UCSD p-System and Unix System III (as with the Torch HDP68K/Unicorn). Pricing (in 1986) ranged from around £3000 for the entry-level C-500 to around £6000 for the top-level C-68000.

The mainboard for the C-68000 is apparently distinct from the Atlas board used in the HDP68K/Unicorn.

One review of the Z80-based C-series noted problems with one of the Tandon floppy disk drives in one review unit. In 1983, Torch filed a lawsuit against Tandon claiming $10 million of lost business due to defective Tandon drives. Another dispute arose between Torch and HH Computers over the design of the latter's Tiger computer, obliquely alleging some kind of misappropriation of technical information related to the C-series, despite the Tiger apparently originating within Tangerine Computer Systems and being sold to HH Computers for further development and manufacture.

Of the many CP/M machines available at the time of the Communicator, one with similar communications facilities was the Wren by Prism Microproducts, announced in early 1984 and featuring 64 KB of RAM (expandable to 256 KB), a built-in 7-inch amber monitor (in contrast to the Communicator's 12-inch colour monitor), twin floppy disk drives, and built-in modem. Designed by Prism and Transam and sold through a joint venture, Wren Computers, with manufacturing undertaken by Thorn EMI, the Wren ran CP/M Plus and was bundled with the Perfect applications suite, M-Tec Computer Services' BBC BASIC, the Executive Desktop suite (offering a range of personal organiser and accessory tools), and communications software. The complete system sold for £1000 plus VAT and also included a three month subscription to the online services Prestel and Micronet 800. Regarded as a transportable machine, the Wren was seen as "proven technology" but "good value for money" at its release in 1984, in contrast to the Communicator which was seen as "impressive" little more than a year earlier at a much higher price. Prism would eventually enter receivership in early 1985. Opus Supplies later took over distribution of the machine, naming it the Wren Executive.

=== Floppy and Hard Disc Packs ===
The Twin Floppy Disc Pack (FDP240) provided two 400 KB floppy drives and supported the standard Acorn disc filing systems. The Hard Disc Pack (HDP240) combined a 400 KB floppy drive with a 20 MB hard disk, connecting to both the disc and 1 MHz bus connectors on the BBC Micro. Both products could be upgraded with Torch's Z80 second processor expansion to provide a complete CP/M-based system.

The Z80 Disc Pack was designed to sit beneath the BBC Micro itself and use short cables to connect the two units together, this raising the height of the keyboard by approximately three inches and making typing "a little difficult". One cable connected the expansion to the computer using the external connector provided for the disk interface, whereas a power cable also needed to be used to connect the expansion's own power supply to the computer, this replacing the computer's own supply which had to be physically disconnected by opening up the case and unplugging cables. The Z80 second processor supplied as part of the product, also available as the ZEP100, was connected to the Tube expansion connector but actually fitted internally within the computer. Available at a cost of around £800, the product also required Acorn's DFS to be fitted, this potentially costing another £100. The Perfect suite of business software was included in the package.

=== Z80 Second Processors ===
The Z80 Disc Pack (ZDP) and Z80 Extension Processor (ZEP) expansions for the BBC Micro each provided a Z80 second processor running CPN. The ZDP240 was effectively the combination of the FDP240 (providing floppy drives) with the ZEP100.

One stated benefit of Torch's Z80 expansions was that they offered more memory to CP/M-based software than typical CP/M systems, 63 KB instead of 53 KB, having Torch's CPN operating system in ROM and taking advantage of the capabilities of the host system for input/output functions.

=== Unicomm ===
A product known as Unicomm was released for BBC Micro systems upgraded with the Z80 Disc Pack offering the communications software of the C-series (Uniview viewdata terminal, Uniterm terminal emulator, Unimail electronic mail) and a modem.

=== Torch Graduate ===
The Torch Graduate provided a 5 MHz 8088 second processor for the BBC Micro running MS-DOS 2.11, fitted with 256 KB of RAM expandable to 640 KB, also providing dual 320 KB (formatted) floppy disk drives. Unlike many BBC Micro second processor solutions, it connected to the host computer using the 1 MHz bus expansion port.

Originally developed and announced by Data Technologies, a company founded by Torch founder Martin Vlieland-Boddy, and set for launch on 14 June 1984, two principal product variants were to be offered - the G400 with only one floppy disk drive costing about £690 (or £600 plus VAT), the G800 with two drives costing about £1000 (or £869 plus VAT) and bundled with the Thorn-EMI Perfect software suite - each configured with either 128 KB or 256 KB of RAM. After considerable delays in bringing the product to market, the product was eventually completed and offered by Torch under licence from Data Technologies in only the dual-drive 256 KB configuration for £1000 plus VAT, bundled with the Psion Xchange software suite.

One of the Graduate's designers went on to start a company, Soft Options, offering support and additional software for the Graduate. During the development of the Graduate, rumours that the product would be made available for the Acorn Electron were dismissed by Data Technologies who indicated that there were "no plans" for such a variant.

Torch had previously announced "an MSDOS workstation" called the Torch 388, featuring the 8088 processor and 256 KB of RAM, based on a board imported from the United States. An estimated cost of £1,995 was quoted for the base machine, with disk drives costing extra. Utilising the same disk controller as the BBC Micro, it was aimed at providing only MS-DOS compatibility and was unable to read IBM disks. At the time, Torch had requested a quote from Data Technologies for "an 8088 board for the BBC micro", choosing not to make its own design into a BBC expansion.

=== HDP68K and Torch Unicorn ===
The HDP68K provided a BBC Micro second processor solution offering a 68000 processor capable of running UNIX System III if acquired as the Unicorn product variant, together with a Z80 processor capable of running CPN, fitted with 256 KB of RAM (but upgradable to 512 KB or 1 MB), a 20 MB hard disk, and a 5.25-inch floppy drive. It connected multiple ports of the host BBC Micro: the Tube for inter-processor communications, the 1 MHz bus for hard disk transfers, and the disc port for the included floppy drive. The Unicorn name was apparently "originally derived from 'UNIX for Acorns'". The initial 256 KB version cost £2,895 plus VAT.

By featuring two processors, the product was intended to offer backwards compatibility to CPN or CP/M users, featuring a faster 6 MHz Z80B processor than other Z80 second processor products (including Torch's own) due to the use of faster memory to support the 8 MHz 68000 processor. Providing two second processors in the same box also allowed users to switch between them without having to unplug one and plug in the other. The Z80 processor was able to address 64 KB of the RAM when active, whereas the 68000 was able to address 256 KB (provided by 64-kilobit devices) up to 1 MB (provided by 256-kilobit devices). The dual-processor board used in the HDP68K was known as Atlas.

The Unix implementation for the HDP68K was provided by a collaboration of UniSoft Incorporated, Root Computers Limited and Torch, providing "genuine Unix System III with the Berkeley enhancements", with the complete set of programs and documentation being delivered on 24 floppy disks. Hardware support for the memory management typically needed by Unix implementations was provided by "a memory management unit to allow multi-tasking without interference between tasks", being interfaced to the CPU via interrupt handling logic, this dealing with timer and communications events, with such communications events originating from the bidirectional channels provided by an Am2950 communicating with the host BBC Micro at a stated 160 KB per second.

Reviewers were generally positive about the Unix functionality provided, with compilers, linkers, editors and other tools being included with the system. However, such praise was tempered by a disappointment with the responsiveness of the system, one reviewer calling "the frequent short pauses fatiguing", another lamenting the "four minutes (no less!) to log on" and that "[w]hen using the screen editor 'vi', the regular transfer of data to disc, unnoticeable on most systems, takes about three seconds on the Unicorn". Such performance issues were identified as being consequences of the architecture of the expansion, with the hard and floppy drives not being directly connected to the Unicorn hardware, but instead being accessed via the 1 MHz bus connection to the BBC Micro to which the drives were connected. With the initial configuration of 256 KB of RAM, insufficient memory was available to cache data transferred from the hard disk, with the larger configurations of 512 KB and 1 MB being anticipated as potentially alleviating such issues. Another concern was the behaviour of the Break key, this reported as losing the Unix session. Despite reservations, the impression of using the Unicorn was described as follows: "If you forget that the processor is next to you, instead of in the basement, it feels like Unix on a VAX. It responds at about the same speed, and at times I couldn't believe a 68000 was in there."

The Unix-based Unicorn product was the basis of a multi-user network solution connecting four or eight BBC Micros together over an Econet local area network, offering electronic mail connectivity between sites over the telephone network, with Torch emphasising the use of System III as opposed to Xenix as a way of benefiting more directly from AT&T's support for the operating system. With Torch having upgraded the Unicorn to support a 10 MHz 68000 and more memory, with 512 KB of RAM supporting a single user, or with 1 MB of RAM supporting multiple users, the Unicorn effectively offered Unix as an option for the BBC Micro for around £3500, with the ability to host other BBC Micros for an additional £500 for the extra RAM and around another £1000 for additional software.

Pursuing a similar market approach to that also pursued by the Acorn Cambridge Workstation, the HDP68K was aimed at and apparently bought by "big customers" like universities and companies wanting to "take the load off the mainframes". In contrast to the Acorn Cambridge Workstation never offering the Unix system promised by Acorn, the HDP68K only appears to have been advertised as supporting Unix or the UCSD p-System. However, CP/M 68K and Tripos were mentioned as possible alternatives.

By the time of the introduction of the Torch Triple X workstation, the Unicorn was reportedly "the UK's best UNIX seller". Described as "the cheapest UNIX system you can buy", the Unicorn system was also described as "VERY SLOW" by one commentator, encouraging potential purchasers to wait for a planned 68000-based system from Torch running at twice the speed.

=== Torch Professional ===
Torch improved their systems based on the BBC Micro and additional processors with the Torch Professional computer range, introducing a modular workstation-style case featuring stackable processor and storage modules. Model names in the range began with either C, indicating networking support, or T, indicating networking and telecommunications support, followed by either Z, indicating a Z80 processor and featuring CPN as the operating system, or X, indicating Z80 and 68000 processors and featuring CPN or Unix as operating systems. Thus, CX, TX, CZ and TZ models were marketed.

Storage units were available in the form of the D1 twin floppy disc unit offering two 400 KB drives, along with the D10 and D20 Winchester disc drive units offering a single 400 KB floppy drive together with 10 MB and 20 MB hard drive capacities respectively. The CX20 and TX20 workstations combined the core 6502-based BBC Micro system, Z80 and 68000 processors, and the D20 storage unit. They were fitted with a total of 544 KB of RAM, upgradeable to 1056 KB, and ran Unix or CP/M software.

The Torch 725 and 750 systems, also available as 725T and 750T variants capable of telecommunications, were effectively a repackaging of the CX and TX models as a complete workstation utilising a single module, fitted with 1 MB of RAM, a 20 MB hard drive and dual floppy drives in the 725, or a 53 MB hard drive in the 750. The 725 was supplied with high-resolution monitor and 102-key keyboard. Pricing (in 1986) ranged from £5650 for the base model to £6050 for the 725/U including Unix. Torch also introduced the 300 series as a range of network terminals.

=== Torch Triple X ===
The Triple X workstation was a Unix-based system based on an 8 MHz Motorola 68010 CPU with 68451 memory management unit and 68450 direct memory access controller, fitted with 1 MB of RAM (expandable to 7 MB), a 720 KB floppy disk drive, a 20 MB hard disk drive, and network interfaces, powered by a single cable also supplying the accompanying 10-inch high-resolution colour monitor. The machine itself employed a modular construction where the base functionality on the main processor/memory board was augmented with a "ring" providing the power supply, fan and disks, and this could be augmented with additional rings providing extra drives or VME bus peripherals, or it could be removed to provide a diskless workstation.

The modular design of the machine had been informed by a process begun early in the development of Torch's "revolutionary new product family, coded XXX" in 1984, after Torch's chairman, Bob Gilkes, received an unsolicited letter from industrial designer John Hawker of Design Technology who convinced Gilkes, who subsequently left Torch, and then technical director, Ray Anderson, of the merits of engaging a designer early in the product development process. Alongside leveraging benefits in the practical aspects of cost management, production and maintenance, the design sought to communicate "a watershed product" in the company's history that would provide "a corporate style for future products" and would accommodate different product configurations.

Alongside the main processor system, and reminiscent of Torch's previous products involving the BBC Micro, a service processor (a 6303 with on-chip RAM and ROM) controlled the video and sound systems, keyboard and mouse, serial and 1 MHz bus, and the real-time clock. A total of 64 KB of video memory was provided, separate from the main system memory, part of which was used to act as a dual-ported communications channel between the main and system processors. The system offered a choice of display resolutions: 720×512 pixels in 2 colours, 720×256 in 4 colours, and 360×256 in 16 colours, with the 4-colour mode being the default. Colours could be chosen from a 256-colour (RGB332) palette, dynamically adjusted, and the software supported halftones to give the impression of a wider range of colours.

The Unix implementation delivered with the system was a UniSoft Systems' UniPlus+ Unix System V, ported for Torch by Root Computers Limited, offering System V compatibility with Berkeley enhancements, together with enhancements by Root to provide direct memory access for disk transfers and code sharing between processes. Torch's enhancements included bitmapped display support and the MMI (man-machine interface), parts of which augmented the kernel with "manager modules" that provided support for window management, keyboard and mouse interaction, fonts, menus, graphics, and so on. The desktop manager offering the graphical environment was a separate process.

Various applications were available for the Triple X including Torch's own Telecomms Manager and the Informix relational database system. To support graphical interaction with the Unix-based system, the OpenTop environment offered a "Macintosh-style desk-top" featuring a menu bar, desktop icons, and multiple overlapping resizable windows, with windows supporting existing terminal-based applications as well as applications written to take advantage of the OpenTop facilities.

Notable aspects of the hardware, at least for the era, included the "soft" power switch: a touch-sensitive button monitored by the service processor that would initiate the shutdown procedure that, upon completion, would result in the power being switched off under software control. The machine was also the first microcomputer to include an X25 data communications port, this being provided alongside Ethernet, RS423 and telephone ports, with the latter being provided to support an internal telephone expansion offering data and voice functionality. This expansion, having been designed for earlier Torch systems, relied on the provision of the 1 MHz bus in the machine.

A CPU upgrade board featuring a 68020 and floating point co-processor was available, utilising the 68010 socket, albeit limiting the external data path of the CPU to the 16-bit bus supported by the system board. Pricing of the base system without monitor was £3995, with 10-inch and 13-inch colour displays, made by Sony but using a case specially designed for the Triple X, being supplied for £699 and £799 respectively. A diskless version was also sold, fitted with 1 MB of RAM, for £2,296.

Initial sales projections for the machine were conservatively estimated at 5000 units per year. The Triple X found sales in a subsidiary of BT called BT Fulcrum, with a £500,000 order being placed in 1986 to supply workstations to other BT divisions. BT Fulcrum, who were manufacturing small Unix-based computers in Birmingham under licence from Bleasdale Computer Systems Limited, negotiated similar manufacturing rights for the Triple X. Unlike the Bleasdale models which BT had also intended to resell, the Triple X was only intended for "internal use within various divisions of BT" as Unix-based personal computers. BT would eventually produce its own 68020- and 68030-based Unix systems - the M6320 (a "desk-top model"), M6520 and M6530 - comprising the M6000 range, apparently mostly aimed at multi-user timesharing as opposed to the workstation emphasis of the Triple X.

Torch also promoted the Triple X for Cambridge University's Project Granta, an initiative aiming to provide large numbers of workstations to researchers and students at the institution. The Triple X was also distributed in other countries. In Norway, Kristiansand-based Computech acquired distribution rights for the machine having lost those for Apple products in Norway, emphasising the machine's connectivity and Macintosh-like graphical user interface, and selling the machine for around kr 60,000 to kr 70,000.

=== Torch Quad X ===
The Quad X workstation upgraded the Triple X specification to a 16.67 MHz 68020 CPU, 68881 floating-point unit, 68851 memory management unit, and a Torch-developed RISC-based direct memory access microcontroller known as OpenChip implemented using a gate array, fitted with 4 MB of RAM (expandable to 16 MB) and an 80 MB hard drive. Similar display capabilities to the Triple X were provided, with a system upgraded to a 20 MHz CPU supporting a higher 1024×768 pixel resolution. SCSI, Ethernet and X.25 interfaces were provided. The Unix system provided by the Quad X was based on Unix System V release 2.2, and although the OpenTop user interface was provided, the X Window System version 11 release 2 was available together with the X-Desktop desktop manager. Pricing started at £6,995 with monitors from £1,000.

Initially announced as the Advanced Triple X in late 1987, coinciding with news of the refinancing necessary to bring the product to market, the machine eventually reached the market in March 1988.

=== Torch QS and QM series ===
A similar combination of Motorola chipset, OpenChip DMA controller, VME bus, storage, and network interfaces was marketed by Torch Technology in 1990 as the QS product family. The QS1000 was a 68010-based system reminiscent of the Triple X with 2 MB of RAM, 80 MB hard drive and 720 KB 5.25-inch floppy drive running the OpenTop environment, and the QS2000 was a 68020-based system (upgradeable to the 68030) with 4 MB of RAM, 80 MB hard drive and 720 KB 5.25-inch floppy drive running the Y-OpenTop environment on top of the X Window System. On such systems, Torch's Unix product offered demand-paged virtual memory and BSD enhancements.

A server product, the QM2000, was largely similar to the QS2000 but emphasised multi-user facilities, offering ten RS-232C serial ports and aiming to support "the processing needs of two to 10 concurrent users", ostensibly providing a X Window System interface on every user terminal. Pricing started at £2,000 for the QS1000, £4,000 for the QS2000, and £5,500 for the QM2000.

=== X-OpenTop and X-Sun ===
Trading as Torch Technology, the company made an X Window System server product for Sun workstations, X-Sun, based on X11 release 2 and eventually release 3 for Sun-3 and Sun-4 workstations. This product was complemented by an X-based version of the OpenTop desktop manager as a separate product known as X-OpenTop.

=== RSVP ===
The RSVP (Raster Scan Video Processor) board, introduced for £1400 in 1988, was a video processing board for the Apple Macintosh II computer, featuring support for 8 bpp (bits per pixel) video input, a frame store, overlaying, and general image processing using a TMS320C25 digital signal processor, with 8 bpp video output employing a 24 bpp palette. Three cards could be combined to support 24 bpp output.

== Popular culture ==
The Torch 300 series featured in the episode Wheelman of the British TV detective series Dempsey and Makepeace. Torch Computers were credited at the end of all Dempsey and Makepeace episodes and were frequently featured in the background of the SI-10 headquarters sequences.

== Other references ==
- "Chris's Acorns: Companies".
- "Torch Computers Ltd".
- "Torch - The Computer to Set the World Alight".
- "VIC 20 Expansion". Electronics & Computing Monthly. April 1982. p. 1.
- "Expand your VIC".
- Moody, Glyn (February 1986). "Torch Triple X Wimps Meet Unix" (PDF). Practical Computing. pp. 54–56.
