= Torch Triple X =

UNIX workstation computer

The Torch Triple X (or XXX) was a UNIX workstation computer produced by the British company Torch Computers, and launched in 1985. It was based on the Motorola 68010 microprocessor and ran a version of UNIX System V.

== Hardware ==
The Triple X was based on an 8 MHz 68010 CPU, with a Hitachi 6303 "service processor". The CPU was accompanied by a 68451 memory management unit and a 68450 DMA controller. Both VMEbus and a BBC Micro-compatible "1MHz bus" expansion buses were provided, as was a SCSI host adapter, and an optional Ethernet interface. Both RS-423 and X.25-compatible synchronous serial ports were provided. This latter feature made the Triple X attractive to the UK academic community, where X.25 networks were prevalent at the time.

Standard RAM capacity was 1 MB, expandable to 7 MB via VME cards. A 720 KB, 5.25-in floppy disk drive and ST-506-compatible 20 MB hard disk were fitted as standard, interfaced to the SCSI bus via an OMTI adapter.

Either a 10 or 13 inch colour monitor was supplied. Two graphics modes were available: 720 × 256 pixels in four colours, or 720 × 512 in two colours.

The Triple X had a novel touch-sensitive "soft" power switch. When switching off, this commanded the operating system to shut down gracefully before powering down.

== Software ==
The Triple X's firmware was called Caretaker. The native operating system was Uniplus+ UNIX System V Release 2. A graphical user interface called OpenTop was also included as standard.

== Quad X ==
The Quad X is an enhanced version of the Triple X, with a 68020 processor and three VME expansion slots. This was produced only in small numbers before Torch became insolvent.
