= John Coll =

British information technology specialist (died 2014)

John Alexander Coll (died 2014) was a British computer specialist. While teaching physics at Oundle school he built a number of computers and was involved in Micro Users in Secondary Education (MUSE). He helped write the functional description for the BBC Computer and played an important role in convincing senior management at the BBC that it could be done. He later wrote the BBC Microcomputer User Guide which was supplied by Acorn Computers with the BBC Micro and appeared regularly on the television programmes Making the Most of the Micro and Micro Live which featured the computer.

== Professional career ==
He taught physics at Keil School and then at Oundle School where he was also head of Electronics and was also a tutor at Laxton House.

At Oundle he learnt to program the school's Data General Nova 2 computer alongside a number of pupils, built a Motorola 6800 based microcomputer from scratch, designing and etching the printed circuit boards personally and then purchased and built a kit SWTPC 6800 computer which was made available to the pupils. His relationship with SWTPC's UK operation helped many former pupils gain gap-year and full-time jobs and a foothold into the computer industry. He was also active with the organisation 'Micro Users in Secondary Education (MUSE)'.

With David Allen, he was then asked by the British Broadcasting Corporation to help draw up the functional description for a computer which would be used as part of a television series to teach computer literacy. Of John, of the team at the BBC said "It was John’s drive, determination and sheer brilliance that really pulled the whole thing off".

He later wrote the BBC Microcomputer User Guide with David Allen which was supplied by Acorn Computers with the BBC Micro, he appeared regularly on the television programmes Making the Most of the Micro and Micro Live and wrote many articles for Personal Computer World during its early years.

John also invested his time in people and he wanted to realize the potential in people. In his part in philanthropy, John was mainly focused on educating people about IT.

Through his company Connection Software he started off the charity Educated Horizons, which funded students from disadvantaged backgrounds from the Chikomba District, to pursue further education in higher institutions of learning in Zimbabwe.

He also equipped many High Schools in the Harare Archdiocese with computers and other IT equipment to ensure the smooth studying of technical subjects like Computer Science. He was the Patron of the St Francis of Assisi Computer Science class (2010).

Until his death on 23 December 2014 John ran Connection Software, a telecoms software house and ASP specialising in SMS, MMS and VOIP.

== Publications ==
- The BBC Microcomputer User Guide was written by John Coll and edited by David Allen for the British Broadcasting Corporation.
