= Making the Most of the Micro =

- Logo from Making the Most of the Micro
- Presented by: Ian McNaught-Davis
- Country of origin: United Kingdom
- No. of episodes: 10

Production
- Running time: 25 minutes (approx.)

Original release
- Network: BBC 2
- Release: 10 January – 14 March 1983

Related
- The Computer Programme; Micro Live

Making the Most of the Micro is a TV series broadcast in 1983 as part of the BBC's Computer Literacy Project. It followed the earlier series The Computer Programme. Unlike its predecessor, Making the Most of the Micro delved somewhat deeper into the technicalities and uses that microcomputers could be put to, once again mainly using the BBC Micro in the studio for demonstration purposes. The series was followed by Micro Live.

== Presenters ==
Ian McNaught-Davis (known as 'Mac') was once again the anchorman but Chris Serle and Gill Nevill were absent, instead various experts were brought in as required to demonstrate some of the more technical aspects of the microcomputers and their uses. John Coll was the main technical 'bod' (he had also written the User Guide for the BBC Micro along with other manuals) and Ian Trackman also featured - he wrote most of the software that was used for demonstrating certain features of the microcomputer, not only for this series but also The Computer Programme and Computers in Control. The programme also featured location reports to demonstrate various practical and business uses of microcomputers.

The title and incidental music was by Roger Limb of the BBC Radiophonic Workshop.

== Programmes ==
The series was split into 10 programmes, each about 25 minutes long and dealing with a particular subject area. They were as follows (original airdates in brackets):

1. The Versatile Machine (10 January 1983)
2. Getting Down to BASIC (17 January 1983)
3. Strings and Things (24 January 1983)
4. Introducing Graphics (31 January 1983)
5. Keeping a Record (7 February 1983)
6. Getting Down to Business (14 February 1983)
7. Sounds Interesting (21 February 1983)
8. Everything Under Control (28 February 1983)
9. Moving Pictures (7 March 1983)
10. At the End of the Line (14 March 1983)

== See also ==
- Micro Men
- The Computer Programme
- Computers in Control
- Micro Live
