= Ian McNaught-Davis =

British television presenter

- McNaught-Davis at 2009 Climbers' Club Welsh Dinner
- Born: 30 August 1929; Wakefield, England
- Died: 10 February 2014 (aged 84)
- Other name: Mac
- Known for: Mountaineering, climbing, BBC Computer Literacy Project

Ian McNaught-Davis (30 August 1929 – 10 February 2014) was a British television presenter best known for presenting the BBC television series The Computer Programme, Making the Most of the Micro and Micro Live in the 1980s. He was also a mountaineer and alpinist. He was managing director of the British subsidiary of Comshare.

== Early life and career ==
The son of Stanley McNaught-Davis, a former RAF pilot, he was educated at Rothwell Grammar School in Lofthouse, West Yorkshire followed by national service in the Royal Air Force where his poor eyesight thwarted his ambitions to become a pilot. He achieved a first in Mathematics at the University of Manchester, where he also became an active mountaineer.

After university he had a variety of jobs including digging ice tunnels for glaciologists on Monte Rosa in Switzerland; fixing roofs and teaching. Eventually he settled as a geophysicist for BP, specialising in Africa.

=== Mountaineering ===
McNaught-Davis was a keen climber, hill walker and hiker. In 1956 he was one of the first to climb the "unclimbable" Muztagh Tower in the Karakoram range in Baltistan. He became honorary librarian of the Climbers' Club in 1961.

In the 1960s, he was a climbing partner of Joe Brown. He took part with Brown in the televised climb of the Old Man of Hoy. He also took part in a climb of the Eiffel Tower, which was televised on the ABC network's Wide World of Sports.

McNaught-Davis made his television debut in 1965 as one of the presenters of a BBC TV mountaineering programme Men Against the Matterhorn, with David Dimbleby and Christopher Brasher.

=== Computing and TV presentation ===
In the 1970s, he changed career, becoming active in information technology, and joined Comshare, where he remained until retirement in 1995. Comshare specialised in software development and resale of redundant operational time on mainframe computer systems. He rose to become chief executive of the European division, and managing director of the British subsidiary.

Between 1975 and 1978, he presented the BBC series It's Patently Obvious, a game show in which two panels of celebrities tried to guess the purpose of unfamiliar inventions.

He presented another BBC series The Computer Programme, Making the Most of the Micro and Micro Live in the 1980s.

In 2008 he was a speaker (along with Dave Allen and George Auckland) at an event entitled The BBC Micro and its legacy hosted by the Computer Conservation Society.

== Honours ==
McNaught-Davis was the first non-Swiss holder of the post president of the UIAA (International Mountaineering and Climbing Federation) between the years of 1995 and 2004.

In 2012 he was a patron of the British Mountaineering Council.

== Private life ==
He married twice, having two sons, John and Simon, from his first marriage to Mary, and a daughter, Elvira Hurrell, from his second marriage to Loreto Herman. In April 2016, his widow married fellow mountaineer Chris Bonington.
