= Runway (game show) =

British television game show (1987–1993)

- Genre: Game show
- Presented by: Chris Serle (1987); Richard Madeley (1988–93)
- Country of origin: United Kingdom
- Original language: English
- No. of series: 5
- No. of episodes: 200

Production
- Running time: 30 minutes (inc. adverts)
- Production company: Action Time in association with Granada

Original release
- Network: ITV
- Release: 12 October 1987 – 19 February 1993

Runway is a British game show that aired on ITV from 12 October 1987 to 19 February 1993 and was originally hosted by Chris Serle in 1987, then by Richard Madeley from 1988 to 1993.

== Gameplay ==
On each episode, three new contestants competed for the chance to win prizes and a holiday.

=== Passport Round ===
Two of the contestants were given clues as to the birth year of the third, including a newspaper front page from the day that contestant was born, and had to give different guesses at the year. The one whose guess was closer or exact received two points, after which the contestant with that birth year was asked three questions about it worth two points each. Any missed questions were offered on the buzzer to the two opponents.

This round ended after each contestant had had the other two guess their birth year.

=== Departure Board ===
Starting with the leader, each contestant was shown a set of nine answers on a video wall and asked a series of questions. Each answer was removed from the wall after the contestant guessed it, whether it was correct or not. Correct answers were worth two points each; the contestant could guess on a question as many times as necessary until finding the answer. If one answer was left on the board as a result of a correct guess, the contestant was asked a question about that item, worth two points. A bonus of two points was awarded for getting every question right, allowing each contestant to score up to 20 points on their individual board.

After each contestant had taken a turn, a fourth board was played under the same rules, with questions on the buzzer and open to all.

=== Dirty Tricks Round ===
Contestants answered questions on the buzzer; a correct answer allowed a contestant to either add four points to their own score or deduct two from one opponent. In early series, a miss deducted four points; this penalty was later changed to a two-point award for both opponents. During the first two series, contestants won prizes for reaching score thresholds of 40, 50, or 60 points.

At the end of the round, the high scorer advanced to the "Holiday Runway" final round. Prizes for the losing contestants consisted of a set of matching luggage in the first series; from the second series onwards, they received a copy of a newspaper from the day they were born, the book Chronicles of the 20th Century, and any prizes won in the Dirty Tricks round.

=== Holiday Runway ===
The day's winner had 75 seconds to answer nine questions correctly about various countries of the world in order to win a major holiday. The host specified a country and began to ask questions about it, the contestant could pass as often as desired. The clock was stopped after every third correct answer so that the contestant could decide how to proceed.

In early series, the host named a destination at the start of the round and after each pause, then began to ask questions about the country in which it was located. If the contestant gave three correct answers, they could either accept a holiday to that destination and end the round, or continue in the hope of winning a longer and more expensive one. The first destination was within the United Kingdom, the second within continental Europe, and the third anywhere in the world. If time expired before the contestant had given six correct answers, they forfeited the UK holiday; if afterward, they received it as a consolation prize.

Later, at each pause, the contestant was offered a choice to keep answering questions in the current country or change to a different one named by the host. They received a holiday to any worldwide destination of their choice for winning the round.

Any contestant who lost in the Holiday Runway round would receive a set of matched luggage.

== Transmissions ==
Series	Start date	End date	Episodes
1	12 October 1987	18 December 1987	50
2	5 September 1988	28 October 1988	40
3	4 September 1989	20 October 1989	35
4*	7 January 1991	11 October 1991	40
5	4 January 1993	19 February 1993	35

- Series 4 was meant to run for 8 weeks (as Richard Madeley said at the start of the first show of the run) but it was pulled from the schedules after 8 days due to news coverage of the Gulf War. It returned on 29 August.
