= Electric Avenue (TV series) =

- Presented by: Fred Harris
- Country of origin: United Kingdom
- Original language: English
- No. of episodes: 15

Production
- Running time: 24 minutes

Original release
- Network: BBC
- Release: 24 October 1988 – 12 February 1990

Related
- Micro Live

Electric Avenue is a late-night British television series, starting with an initial ten-episode series in 1988. The show followed Micro Live as part of the BBC Computer Literacy Project, and was presented by Fred Harris.

== Programmes ==
The first series was split into ten programmes, each about twenty-four minutes long and dealing with a particular subject area. They were as follows (original air-dates in brackets):

1. The By-Product - (24 October 1988)
2. The Machine - (31 October 1988)
3. Well Connected - (7 November 1988)
4. What Next? - (14 November 1988)
5. New Directions - (28 November 1988)
6. Chips and Drumsticks - (5 December 1988)
7. Housewives Choice? - (12 December 1988)
8. Money Talks - (9 January 1989)
9. Safety First - (16 January 1989)
10. The Design Machine - (23 January 1989)

In 1990 a second series aired, with five further episodes:

1. Computing the President - (15 January 1990)
2. The Experts' Expert - (22 January 1990)
3. Computers Can't Go Wrong, Can They? - (29 January 1990)
4. Computers: A Cautionary Tale - (5 February 1990)
5. Home Bleep Home - (12 February 1990)
