= BBC Micro expansion unit =

Series of Acorn Computers peripherals

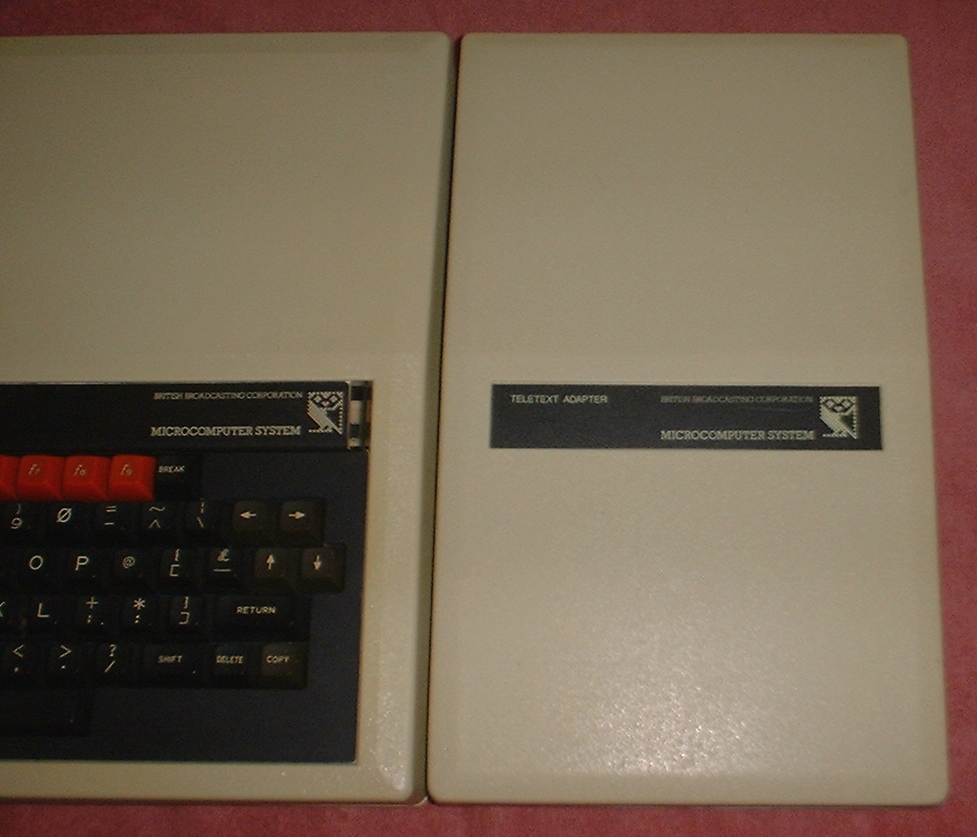
Teletext Adapter alongside a BBC Model B

A BBC Micro expansion unit, for the BBC Micro is one of a number of peripherals in a box with the same profile and styling as the main computer.

== Second processors ==
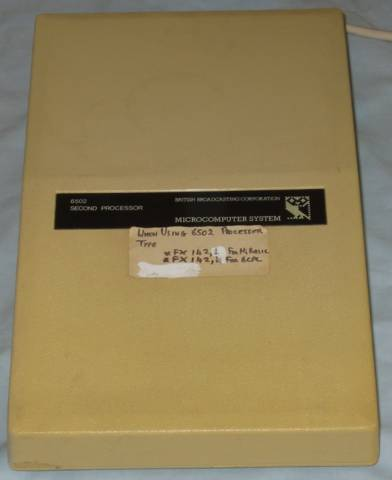
6502 Second Processor

The second processors are connected to Acorn's proprietary and trademarked Tube interface. Only one second processor unit could be connected at a time to a BBC Micro, although a Master 128 could also have a co-processor fitted internally at the same time. The terminology of second processor was slightly misleading, since connected and switched on, the system worked on a "host-parasite" model, with the processor in the external unit taking control while the 6502 in the "main" computer simply took on responsibility for I/O.

=== 6502 second processor ===
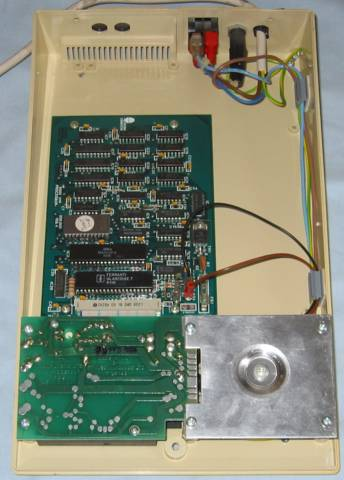
Interior of the 6502 Second Processor

The 6502 Second Processor used a 6502C processor clocked at 3 MHz, a full 50% faster than the 6502 inside a BBC Model B, and also had 64 KB of RAM, of which typically 30–44 KB was free for application data (compared to as little as 8.5 KB on an unexpanded Model B in graphics mode, or only 5.75 KB with the disc interface). A version of BBC BASIC II, called Hi-BASIC, was delivered on ROM with this processor together with a DNFS ROM containing the latest versions of the Disc Filing System (DFS) and Econet network filing system (NFS). The product was launched with a price of £199.

The Bitstik CAD system, originally developed by Robocom for the Apple II, was offered as an accessory for the 6502 Second Processor, also requiring dual 80-track floppy drives. The Bitstik system itself was introduced with a price of around £375, which combined with floppy drives estimated at £500, the second processor at £199, the cost of the BBC Micro itself at £399, and the price of a colour monitor (Acorn recommending their own RGB monitor), the total investment was estimated to be between £1500 and £2000 depending on any particular customer's existing equipment and preferences. Featuring a three-axis joystick, offering the usual two-dimensional navigation plus a knob to control zooming, the software worked in the high-resolution four-colour display mode, providing support for the display and editing of scalable vector graphics. The dual-drive arrangement was necessary to allow the first drive to provide access to the utilities and for the second drive to act as a "drawing buffer".

The original Bitstik product had been introduced for the 64 KB Apple II Plus in 1982 at a price of £275 for the device and software itself, with a complete system costing around £2000. This was, however, considered "extremely good value", given that a "ready-to-use 'turnkey' drawing computer" would have cost £100,000 for a minicomputer-based system in 1980, and even at the start of 1982 could have cost £20,000. To realise the "full potential" of the solution, a plotter was recommended, although A3-sized plotters cost at least £1,000, with a Tektronix A2-sized model costing £6,500 but offering a precision of 0.001mm. In a review published in late 1982, the solution was regarded as "the most powerful drawing system available in Britain today for use on small computers". By 1984, Robocom was claiming to be the UK's leading supplier of CAD solutions, with 2,500 users, and the Acorn-licensed version of the Bitstik solution offered a higher screen resolution, more colours, and better performance. At launch, only Acorn's own Sparkjet printer was supported as an output device, however.

Various CAD programs were able to take advantage of the 6502 Second Processor, as was the second processor-specific version of Elite. Hi versions of View, WordWise and Intersheet were also produced.

=== Z80 second processor ===
The Z80 Second Processor featured a Z80B CPU running at 6 MHz accessing 64 KB of RAM. It required the floppy disc upgrade and, being aimed at business, enabled the BBC system to run CP/M programs. As noted in one review, with reference to the intended appeal of the BBC Micro to the home, education and business markets, with the Z80 second processor "Acorn have completed the BBC Microcomputer system as originally planned".

The product was launched in mid-1984 at a price of £299 and included an estimated £3000 worth of bundled software that included the CP/M 2.2 operating system itself (with GSX graphics), CIS Cobol and utilities from Microfocus, the Memo Plan, Graph Plan and File Plan office applications from Chang Laboratories, the Accountant and Nucleus packages from Compact Accounting Services, and two BASIC implementations: Z80 BBC BASIC and Mallard Professional BASIC.

Despite "a policy of continuous improvement", Acorn apparently abandoned plans to update the software bundle in mid-1986 due to a review of the CP/M market. Other suppliers continued to support the Z80, delivering Z80 second processor hardware and software bundles, such as the Task-Master which combined an externally connected second processor, compatible with the BBC Model B, B+ and Master, and a suite of software including a CP/M 2.2-compatible operating system known as ZCPR3 and Borland's Turbo Pascal plus other development tools.

=== 32016 second processor ===
Originally referred to as the Gluon, a National Semiconductor 32016 second processor solution was apparently planned for the BBC Micro and for other 8-bit microcomputers, with the BBC Micro version employing the Tube interface and offering a quarter of a megabyte of RAM, whereas the "Universal Gluon" would be connected to a microcomputer acting as a terminal using a serial or parallel interface, offer up to 1 MB of RAM, up to 5 MB of hard disk storage, and either a minimal operating system or Unix. Subsequent news of the second processor indicated the renaming of the product, dropping the Gluon name, the use of Acorn's own Panos operating system instead of Xenix, with availability in 1985.

The product that was eventually delivered is a sophisticated second processor expansion sometimes branded as "Acorn Cambridge Co-Processor" with an Acorn logo, and sometimes as "BBC Microcomputer System 32016 Second Processor" along with the BBC Micro's owl logo. The device uses the 32016 CPU and 32081 FPU running at 6 MHz. It runs the non-graphical Panos operating system. Various programming languages are available including C, FORTRAN, Lisp, and Pascal, in addition to a version of BBC BASIC. Initially offered as the 32016 Second Processor with 256 KB of RAM, the expansion was subsequently delivered as the Cambridge Co-Processor with 512 KB or 1 MB of RAM as standard. The 1 MB model sold for £1,295 including VAT.

The 32016 second processor is also present as part of the Acorn Cambridge Workstation using an 8 MHz CPU and 4 MB of RAM, sold as part of the Acorn Business Computer line. Originally, Acorn had apparently sought to use CPUs rated for 10 MHz, but seemed to have settled for available parts as the different products were introduced. The second processor board was also able to use 64-kilobit or 256-kilobit RAM devices, thus allowing the earlier 256 KB specification to be upgraded to 1 MB as the higher-density devices became available and affordable.

=== Universal second processor unit ===
The Universal Second Processor Unit was an adapter for BBC Master internal co-processor boards, to allow them to be used as external co-processors. It comprised a power supply, interface logic and a connector that matched the internal co-processor connector built into the BBC Master main board. This allowed the BBC B and B+ to use the Turbo board (4 MHz 65C102 with 64 KB of RAM) and the Master 512 board (10 MHz 80186 with 512 KB of RAM), by fitting them into this expansion unit. It also allowed the BBC Master to have two internal co-processor boards connected, only one of which could be enabled through software. Watford Electronics sold a similar solution called the Co-Pro Adaptor.

=== ARM evaluation system ===
The ARM Evaluation System was announced in July 1986 for fourth quarter availability at a cost of £4,500 plus VAT. As one of the first production RISC processors, the ARM Evaluation System was part of the development programme leading to the Acorn Archimedes and its early Arthur operating system. It was not branded "BBC", but it is physically contained within the family's "cheese wedge" case. The ARM 1 processor was clocked at 8 MHz, and was fitted with 2 MB or 4 MB of RAM.

In 2006, a new ARM processor board using an ARM7TDMI processor was designed and sold, without an enclosure but able to fit within the original case.

=== Other second processors ===
Several other second processor solutions were produced by third-party suppliers, typically employing a different style of casing than the standard expansion unit profile, with some using the 1 MHz bus instead of the Tube connector, and with others merely providing a conventional serial link.

Z80 second processors offering 64 KB of RAM and CP/M-compatible operating systems included the Multiform Z80 from Technomatic, priced at £299, and several products from Torch Computers such as the Z80 Disc Pack (ZDP) and ZEP, the latter priced at around £340.

Torch also offered the Intel 8088-based Graduate running MS-DOS and having 256 KB of RAM and dual floppy drives, priced at £1000 plus VAT, and the Z80- and 68000-based HDP68K or Unicorn, the latter running Unix and having 256 KB of RAM or more, floppy drive and 20 MB hard drive.

Various other 68000-based second processor solutions were offered, such as the Casper by CA Special Products, the Cambridge Microprocessor Systems 68000 second processor, the Flight Electronics 68000 processor board, and the Micro Developments MD512k Universal Second Processor System.

Although Acorn never released a 68000 second processor product, Acorn's co-founder, Chris Curry, speculated on the nature of a 68000-based second processor product utilising its predecessor to the BBC Micro, the Proton. Indicating the need for "quite a full Proton system" acting as a front end to a 68000-based unit, the tentative projected cost of the Proton system was thought to be around £450, with the expansion unit costing around £1,000, offering 256 KB or 512 KB of RAM. The Unix and TRIPOS operating systems were considered to be likely candidates to run on the expansion.

Cumana chose to produce a 68008 second processor running the OS-9 operating system that was installed into the 6502 CPU socket, relocating the 6502 to the second processor board itself, and providing 512 KB RAM and its own disk controller. Initial pricing was announced as £695 plus VAT, although subsequent recommended retail prices were around £800 for the upgrade board alone, with "particularly keenly priced" bundles of the board with 10 MB and 20 MB hard drives available for £900 and £1,000 respectively. Performance concerns associated with the 68008, due to experiences with the Sinclair QL, were alleviated through the presence of "plenty of sub processors", these utilised for managing peripherals including control of floppy and SASI-compatible hard drives, coupled with the use of a relatively fast 8 MHz CPU. Due to the method of interfacing the second processor to the host system, the board was also able to give the 68008 direct access to the host machine's user port, 1 MHz bus and analogue port, permitting the development of programs in languages like C to utilise these capabilities. Indeed, Cumana bundled an estimated £3000 worth of software with the board, including assembly language, BASIC, Pascal and C language tools, the "fourth generation language" Sculptor, word processing, spellchecking, mail merge, spreadsheet and database applications, plus a screen editor.

Cambridge Microprocessor Systems (CMS) and Control Universal both offered 6809 second processor solutions equipped with 64 KB of RAM and supporting the FLEX operating system. The CMS product was a single board that could be fitted inside the BBC Micro's case and connected to the Tube interface internally, with the option of connecting the board externally in a Eurocard rack, whereas Control Universal's product consisted of two separate boards providing the CPU and memory mounted in a Eurocard rack, plus a separate interface board. Both products employed two 6522 VIA devices to interface with the Tube interface instead of using a dedicated Tube ULA. A 6809 second processor project had been pursued internally within Acorn, leading to a tentative product that would offer better support for high-level languages, but the product was not brought to market, with Acorn choosing to emphasise the 6502, whose performance was being steadily improved relative to the 6809.

Permanent Memory Systems produced a 6502 second processor, the B2P 6502, employing a 2 MHz 65C02 processor – as opposed to the faster 6502 device used by the Acorn 6502 Second Processor unit – together with 64 KB of RAM. Connecting to the Tube and 1 MHz bus connectors, the expansion did not use Acorn's Tube ULA and thus risked incompatibility with some software written for the Acorn unit, but the benefit of this approach was the B2P's more competitive price of around £100.

== Adapters ==
The adapters connected to the BBC Micro's 1 MHz bus interface. Adapters could be daisy-chained, allowing more than one to be fitted.

=== Teletext adapter ===
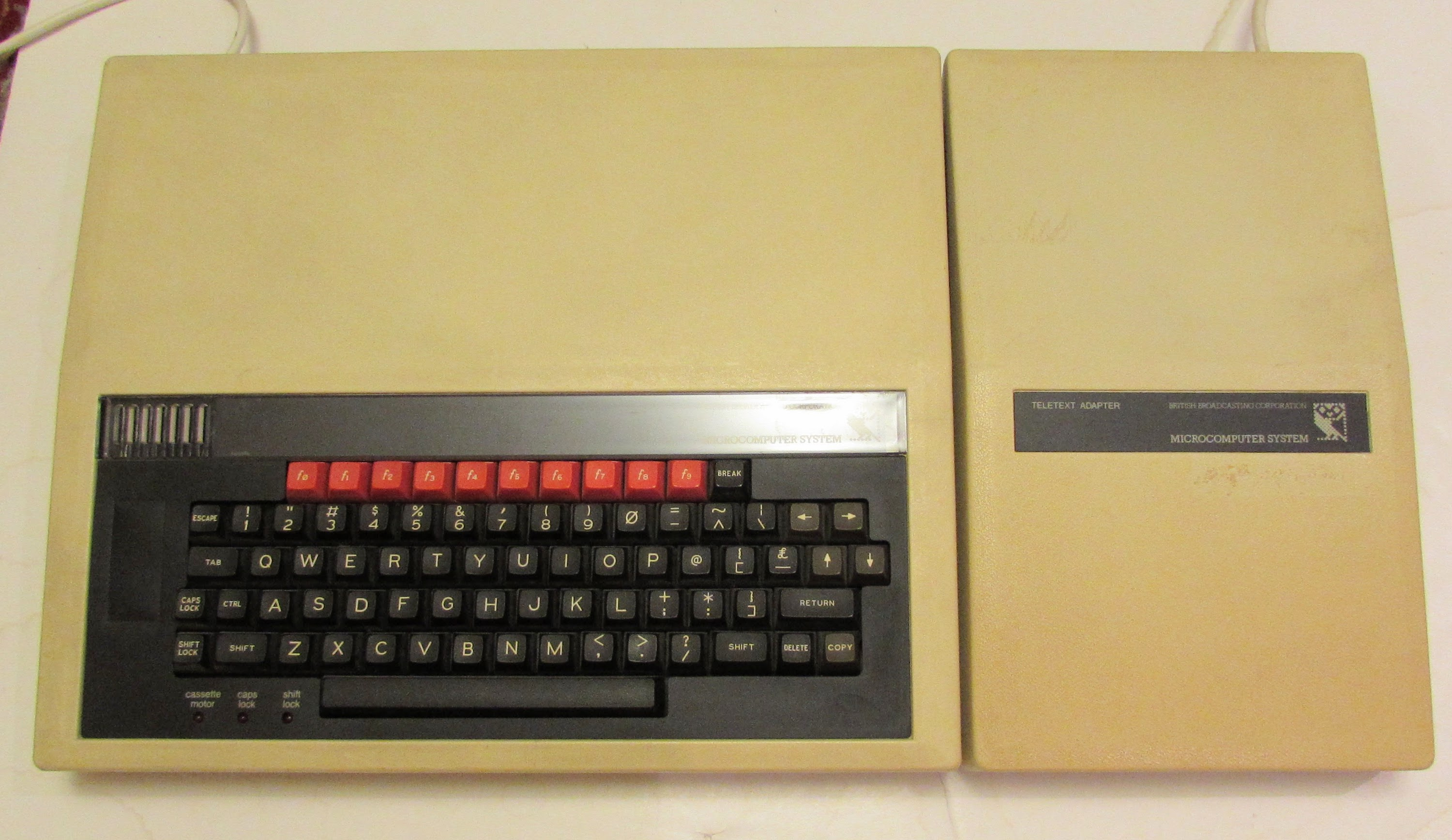
The BBC with Teletext Adaptor on the right.

The teletext-like "Mode 7" display mode inside the 8-bit BBC Micros made a broadcast teletext adapter an obvious expansion, and the BBC would broadcast telesoftware free over Ceefax. The hardware and software design was created by Graham Toal. The initial software to use the adapter was quite basic but the BBC decided to rewrite it and produced the Advanced Teletext System in conjunction with GIS. The new ROM software added several features including support for the new Fastext system, which introduced the four coloured buttons subsequently found almost ubiquitously on European remote controls, including the "red button" which remains a feature of digital television broadcasting. A software downloader was also provided in ROM, permitting access to software available via the broadcast medium known as telesoftware. The downloader could be accessed by pressing a function key, this initiating a search for a catalogue of available software and opening a menu displaying the catalogue. Various commands were also provided to access teletext and telesoftware features.

The adapter itself was mains powered with its own power switch matching the one on the BBC microcomputer. Connection to the computer was via a ribbon cable and the only other connector on the adapter was a female 75 ohm TV aerial (in) connector. The adapter contained four manual tuning wheels to receive signals from four different broadcast channels. Rear view of the adapter. Once tuned, use of the adapter, including switching channels, was controlled via the computer. Teletext pages were displayed on the computer monitor.

=== Prestel adapter ===
The Prestel adapter was essentially a modem fitted into the "cheese wedge"-shaped case. It enabled the user to connect to Prestel viewdata services over a telephone line.

=== IEEE 488 interface ===
Allowed the BBC Micro to talk over an IEEE-488 bus to specialised equipment. "Acorn" rather than "BBC" branded.

== Econet bridge ==
Used to connect two Econet segments together. An Econet bridge is capable of automatically learning a simple network topology and selectively forwarding packets from one LAN segment to the other using a simple routing table based on the contents of the network byte in the Econet packet.

The Econet bridge is unique among the cheese wedge expansions, in that it is a stand-alone device that does not require a BBC computer to operate.
