= Gale Pedrick =

English author and broadcaster (1906–1970)

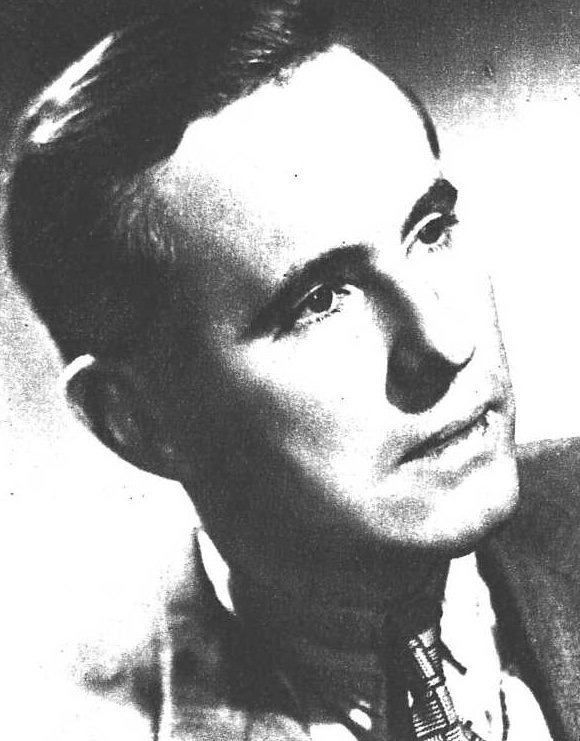
Pedrick in 1946

Frank Gale Pedrick-Harvey (born Pedrick; 15 June 1906 – 23 February 1970), known professionally as Gale Pedrick, was an English writer, journalist, scriptwriter, and broadcaster.

== Life ==
Pedrick was born on 15 June 1906, in London, England, and was educated at Sir Roger Manwood's School at Sandwich.

He began work as a newspaper journalist, first for the Western Mail in Plymouth, in 1920, then for the Daily Dispatch in Manchester, before moving to London to be a theatre critic and feature writer for The Star. He began broadcasting for the BBC in 1926, but during World War II served in the Devonshire Regiment and worked for the British Forces Broadcasting Service, which he was managing by 1944, from a studio in Algiers. He reached the rank of lieutenant-colonel and was mentioned in dispatches.

Between 1946 and 1949 he was a script editor for the BBC. He also created and produced Pick of the Week, a compilation of the week's broadcast highlights, which he selected. His works for the BBC included scripts for television, including the first 35 episodes of the UK version of This Is Your Life, and radio, from which there was at least one spin-off book, the crime fiction Meet the Rev. He also wrote the novelisation tie-ins for Steptoe and Son. He co-wrote George Formby's last film, George in Civvy Street.

He appeared as a castaway on the BBC Radio programme Desert Island Discs on 15 February 1965.

Pedrick collapsed and died at Tottenham Court Road station on 23 February 1970, aged 64. An obituary was published in The Times the next day.

== Bibliography ==
- —— (1946). Meet the Rev. Sampson Low.
- —— (1961). Profitable Scriptwriting for TV & Radio. Pearson.
- —— (1964). Life With Rossetti; or, No Peacocks Allowed. Macdonald.
- —— (1964). Battledress Broadcasters: A History of the British Forces Broadcasting Service. British Forces Broadcasting Service.
- —— (1964). Steptoe and Son. Hodder & Stoughton.
- —— (1966). Steptoe and Son at the Palace. Hodder & Stoughton.
