= Pick of the Week (radio) =

- Genre: Anthology
- Country of origin: UK
- Language: English
- Home station: BBC Radio 4
- Hosted by: John Ellison (1959–73); Margaret Howard (1974–91); Chris Serle (1991–98); Guest hosts (1998–present)
- Created by: Gale Pedrick
- Produced by: Gale Pedrick (1959–70); Nancy Wise (1970–4); Anthony McKee (2024–present)
- Original release: 3 April 1959
- Website: www.bbc.co.uk/radio4/potw/

Pick of the Week is a long-running British radio programme featuring extracts from BBC radio (and originally television) programmes broadcast over the previous seven days. It was first broadcast on the BBC Home Service in 1959, and transferred to its successor station BBC Radio 4 in 1967. Until 1998, it was broadcast on Friday evening, with a repeat (sometimes edited) on Sunday. Since 1998, it has appeared on Sunday only.

Items are drawn from all of the BBC's local and national radio networks, as well as the BBC World Service. Although not a request show as such, listeners are invited to send in suggestions for the programme.

== History ==
The programme was originally written and produced by Gale Pedrick and presented by John Ellison. After Pedrick's death in 1970, production was taken over by Nancy Wise. Ellison died in January 1974, and over the first half of the year David Davis, Martin Muncaster and David Dunhill all had short runs as presenter, before Margaret Howard took over as permanent host in July, also producing with a rotating team of co-producers.

Howard remained as the presenter until 1991, when the BBC chose not to renew her contract, a decision which caused some controversy at the time. Chris Serle became the new host and remained so until 1998 when as part of controller James Boyle's changes to Radio 4, it started to be hosted by guest presenters each week, an arrangement which continues to the present day.

Since 2008, a special Pick of the Year episode has been broadcast each December with a guest presenter choosing their BBC radio highlights of the year.

In 2024, production of the programme moved to Belfast as part of a new unit based in Scotland and Northern Ireland.
