= Granny's Garden =

1983 video game

- Developer: 4Mation
- Publisher: 4Mation
- Designer: Mike Matson
- Platforms: Acorn Archimedes, Amstrad CPC, Mac OS Classic, BBC Micro, Commodore 64, Amiga, Microsoft Windows, ZX Spectrum, iPhone, iPad, OS X
- Release: BBC Micro & ZX Spectrum; UK: 1983; Amstrad CPC & Commodore 64; AU: 1987; Amiga; UK: 1989; Apple II; AU: 1991; Acorn Archimedes; UK: 1992; Windows; UK: 8 December 2006; Mac OS Classic; UK: 2001; OS X; UK: 2007; iPad; WW: 8 June 2014; iPhone; WW: 8 June 2014
- Genre: Adventure
- Mode: Single player

Granny's Garden is an educational adventure game for the British BBC Micro computer, released in 1983. It served as a first introduction to computers for many schoolchildren in the United Kingdom during the 1980s and 1990s. According to the 4Mation webpage about the original version, it was the reason many teachers decided that computers had a real place in education. The software is still available in its original and updated formats.

Created by Mike Matson for 4Mation, the game takes place in the Kingdom of the Mountains. The aim is to find the six missing children of the King and Queen, while avoiding the evil witch, by solving puzzles.
