= Callan Data Systems =

- Industry: Computers
- Founded: 1980; 46 years ago in Westlake Village, California
- Founder: David Callan
- Defunct: December 1985
- Fate: Bankruptcy liquidation

Callan Data Systems, Inc. was an American computer manufacturer founded by David Callan in Westlake Village, California on January 24, 1980. The company was best known for their Unistar range of Unix workstations, and shut down again in 1985.

== Unistar ==
After initial success building a Multibus chassis with a self-contained VT100-compatible CRT display terminal to OEMs, the company designed and built desktop workstations named Unistar using the Sun-1 board, which was based on the Motorola 68000 CPU, and which ran UNIX licensed from AT&T. The manufacturing consisted of building the chassis, power supplies, motherboard, and a few critical Multibus boards such as the CPU, memory, and floppy and hard drive controllers. Other peripheral boards such as an Ethernet controller were purchased from other OEMs. The software development consisted chiefly of writing device drivers for the integrated system, based on the UNIX kernel, and integrating third-party applications for resale to customers. Investment totaled $10 million, raised from the founders and from venture capital. Employment peaked in 1984 at 80 persons.

Other firms at the time were competing to build the first commercial UNIX workstations based on inexpensive microprocessor-based Multibus-single-board CPUs. Among these competitors were Sun Microsystems (which based their initial enormous success on their original similar SUN-based workstation), HP, Apollo, Ithaca InterSystems and Wicat.

Callan sold about a thousand units in various models, including the Unistar 100, 200, and 300. The 100 and 200 models, first delivered in 1982, used the desktop chassis/CRT combination with Multibus backplane, with a list price of about $12,000. The 300 model of 1985 was a floor-standing chassis using dumb terminals, and sold for about $20,000. CPU speeds were typically 8 MHz, with 256KB to 2MB of main memory, and from 10MB to 43MB of hard disk storage. A 400 model using 360MB Fujitsu hard drives was prototyped. UNIX V7 was originally ported to the Unistars, and later UNIX System V; all the Uniplus ports were provided by UniSoft.

== Decline ==
Although aggressive sales of the Unistar computers won a modest number of industrial and government buyers, with sales peaking at $7 million in 1984, Callan was not selling enough to be profitable. Competitive workstations from Sun and HP running BSD UNIX were gaining market share, and the UNIX System V incompatibilities, though slight, made it even more difficult for Callan to compete. Sales in 1985 shrank to less than half the previous year, and Callan was reorganized in bankruptcy under the control of numerous creditors. After a few futile months of attempting recovery, the committee of creditors voted to liquidate the company assets valued at $1.6 million by public auction in bulk. The Dove family auctioneers, who had famously handled the recent liquidation of the Osborne Computer Corporation, won the company assets for $201 thousand (13 cents per dollar of valuation) in December 1985, and began selling inventory to owners of systems who wanted spare parts or upgrades at full price. After several weeks of this retailing, the Doves held a public auction at the plant site in February 1986, selling the entire remaining inventory to the highest bidders, and reaping many times their original investment. The bankruptcy proceeding eventually paid secured creditors in full. Unsecured creditors were left holding $1.9 million in debt, and in 1988 were paid 1.3 cents for each dollar to finally close the case.

Callan Unistar computers continued to be used during the 1980s. At least one Unistar 300 was still running a critical database application for the U.S. Government into the 1990s.

== See also ==
- Workstation
