= Micro Live =

BBC television series

- Micro Live title card
- Presented by: Ian McNaught-Davis; Lesley Judd; Fred Harris; Connor Freff Cochran
- Country of origin: United Kingdom
- Original language: English

Production
- Running time: 30 minutes / 60 minutes 120 minutes (special)

Original release
- Network: BBC 2
- Release: 2 October 1983 – 28 March 1987

Related
- Making the Most of the Micro; Electric Avenue

Micro Live is a BBC2 television series that was produced by David Allen, as part of the BBC's Computer Literacy Project. It followed on from earlier series such as The Computer Programme, Computers in Control, and Making the Most of the Micro. As the name implies, the series was broadcast live (thus causing its own problems such as a incident of a hacked email account).

The first programme was a one-off two-hour-long special, broadcast on Sunday 2 October 1983 as Making the Most of the Micro Live. A second one-hour special was broadcast in the summer of 1984, during which it was announced that Micro Live would be back on BBC2 as a regular monthly one-hour series starting in October of that year. A second season of Micro Live launched in 1985 as a weekly half-hour programme and was followed by a third series of weekly half-hour shows in 1986. The series broadcast its last programme on 28 March 1987.

The scope of the programme was much wider than the preceding computer series and had a less formal feel due to its live nature. Not only did it cover more subject areas but it also featured more microcomputers instead of its main focus being the BBC Micro, however, the BBC Micro's replacement – the Acorn Archimedes – featured prominently in the final series. It regularly included stories from the United States and recorded various small but significant milestones, such as the first on-air transatlantic mobile phone call, made from Lesley Judd sitting in a Sinclair C5 outside Television Centre to Freff on the top of a New York skyscraper in a snowstorm.

== Presenters ==
Ian McNaught-Davis was once again the anchorman and he was joined over the course of the series by regulars Lesley Judd, Fred Harris and Connor Freff Cochran, an American journalist who did live broadcast and filmed reports from the USA.

== BBC Software for Schools Competition ==
The joint winners of this competition held in 1984 were Trevor Inns from Drayton Manor High School and Simon Harriss and David Eldridge of William Howard School, Brampton.

== Hacking incident ==
The first one-off special was the subject of a memorable hacking incident. Ian McNaught-Davis and John Coll logged into the programme's BT Gold email account to demonstrate the features of the then relatively new idea of email, only to find that the account had been hacked. Shortly before air, the floor manager had informed Ian McNaught-Davis the password for the account, unfortunately while his microphone was live. Visiting computer guests, who were in the green room, overheard this information and immediately telephoned a friendly hacker, who proceeded to use the information to get into the account.

The following text was displayed once John Coll had logged in:

Computer Security Error. Illegal access.
I hope your Television PROGRAMME runs
as smoothly as my PROGRAM worked out
your passwords! Nothing is secure!

Hackers' Song.

"Put another password in,
Bomb it out and try again,
Try to get past logging in,
we're Hacking, Hacking, Hacking.

Try his first wife's maiden name,
This is more than just a game,
It's real fun, but just the same,
It's Hacking, Hacking, Hacking."

The NutCracker
( Hackers' UK )

HI THERE, OWLETS, FROM OZ AND YUG (OLIVER AND GUY)

After that John Coll was able to read his email and continue the demonstration as no damage had been done to the account (although Oz and Yug had sent a few emails).

== See also ==
- Micro Men
- The Computer Programme
- Making the Most of the Micro
- Computers in Control
- The Computer Chronicles
