= The Computer Programme =

1982 British TV series

- Logo
- Presented by: Ian McNaught-Davis; Chris Serle
- Theme music composer: Kraftwerk
- Opening theme: Computer World
- Country of origin: United Kingdom
- No. of episodes: 10

Production
- Running time: 25 minutes (approx.)

Original release
- Network: BBC 2
- Release: 11 January – 15 March 1982

Related
- Making the Most of the Micro

The Computer Programme is a TV series, produced by Paul Kriwaczek, originally broadcast by the BBC (on BBC 2) in 1982. The idea behind the series was to introduce people to computers and show them what they were capable of. The BBC wanted to use their own computer, so the BBC Micro was developed by Acorn Computers as part of the BBC Computer Literacy Project, and was featured in this series. The series was successful enough for two series to follow it, namely Making the Most of the Micro in 1983 and Micro Live from 1984 until 1987.

== Presenters ==
The two studio presenters were Ian McNaught-Davis (known as 'Mac') and Chris Serle, the former showing the latter some of the rudimentary basics of computer operation and BASIC programming. The 'on location' reporter was Gill Nevill. The studio made heavy use of the new BBC Micro, which had recently been launched.

== Production ==
Filming of the series took place in October 1981, before Acorn had fully completed the development and productionization of the BBC Micro. The machines used on the demonstration segments were in fact early pre-production models which barely worked, and Acorn engineer Steve Furber was working behind the set to keep the machines running (this was depicted on the 2009 BBC dramatisation Micro Men which documented the Sinclair-Acorn rivalry). One of the issues found with the early units was their ULA chips overheating under the studio lights. The linear power supply units (PSU) on the early BBC Micros were also prone to overheating and in some cases, catching fire - something that dogged the early production machines. Fellow Acorn engineer Sophie Wilson also recounted that some of the BBC Micros used in the studio were in fact dummy units connected to a modified Acorn Eurocard system development rack hidden out of sight which was actually running the software.

== Format ==
Each programme would normally start with either Serle or McNaught-Davis introducing a real-life situation where computers are being (or could be) applied – examples included the office, a car factory and the British Library. This would form the theme which would underpin the demonstrations shown on the programme.

== Distribution ==
The programme was broadcast in the United States in 1983 by PBS.

In addition, stock footage from The Computer Programme was incorporated into the 2009 BBC one-off drama Micro Men, which focused on the early fortunes of British computer manufacturers Sinclair Research and Acorn Computers (manufacturers of the ZX Spectrum and BBC Micro, respectively), which both featured heavily on the show during its original run.

The show was aired as Connecta el micro, pica l'start (Connect the micro, push start) on the Catalan channel TV3. This adapted version included the original 30 minutes taken from the BBC's show plus 15 minutes with original footage. In this original footage the BBC Micro computers were replaced by Dragon 200 computers, which were made in Spain.

== Programmes ==
The series was split into 10 programmes, each about 25 minutes long and dealing with a particular subject area. They were as follows (original airdates in brackets):

1. It's Happening Now – (11 January 1982)
2. Just One Thing After Another – (18 January 1982)
3. Talking to a Machine – (25 January 1982)
4. It's on the Computer – (1 February 1982)
5. The New Media – (8 February 1982)
6. Moving Pictures – (15 February 1982)
7. Let's Pretend – (22 February 1982)
8. The Thinking Machine – (1 March 1982)
9. In Control – (8 March 1982)
10. Things to Come – (15 March 1982)

== Theme music and opening titles ==
The theme music to the programme was Kraftwerk's "Computer World", taken from their 1981 album of the same name. The opening titles was an animation of an owl – the mascot (and logo) of the BBC Microcomputer system – flying into a domestic living room. The "owl" theme would be used on the two successor shows. The ending was "Computer World 2", from the same album.

== Book ==
The Computer Book
- cover image, showing Chris Serle from the television programme with a BBC micro
- Author: Robin Bradbeer; Peter De Bono; Peter Laurie
- Language: English
- Publisher: BBC
- Publication date: 1982
- Publication place: United Kingdom
- Media type: Print
- ISBN: 0563164840
- OCLC: 8780275

An accompanying book, The Computer Book, was commissioned by the BBC to tie in with the series, giving an introduction to microcomputers and general computing.

Its content covers the basics of the history of computing, programming languages, debugging, logic programming, semiconductor memory, printing, ADCs/DACs, flowcharts, as well as some technologies only found in Britain (such as Prestel, Ceefax, ORACLE). The possibilities of networks, robotics, electronic offices and publishing were also considered, with particular reference to the BBC Micro.

=== Reception ===
The book sold 80,000 copies in the UK, reaching the top of the UK non-fiction chart.

Reviewing the United States edition (The Beginner's Guide to Computers, Penguin/Addison Wesley, 1982), The New York Times described the book's square shape as "clumsy", although this did not stop it from being a "quite decent introduction" which was "easy to read". Those interested in actually using personal computers to "do something" were advised to look elsewhere. The World Yearbook of Education 1982/83: Computers and Education described it as "lucidly written and well laid out with profuse illustrations", noting the use of "appealing cartoons".

== See also ==
- Making the Most of the Micro
- Micro Live
