= UniSoft =

American software developer

UniSoft Corporation
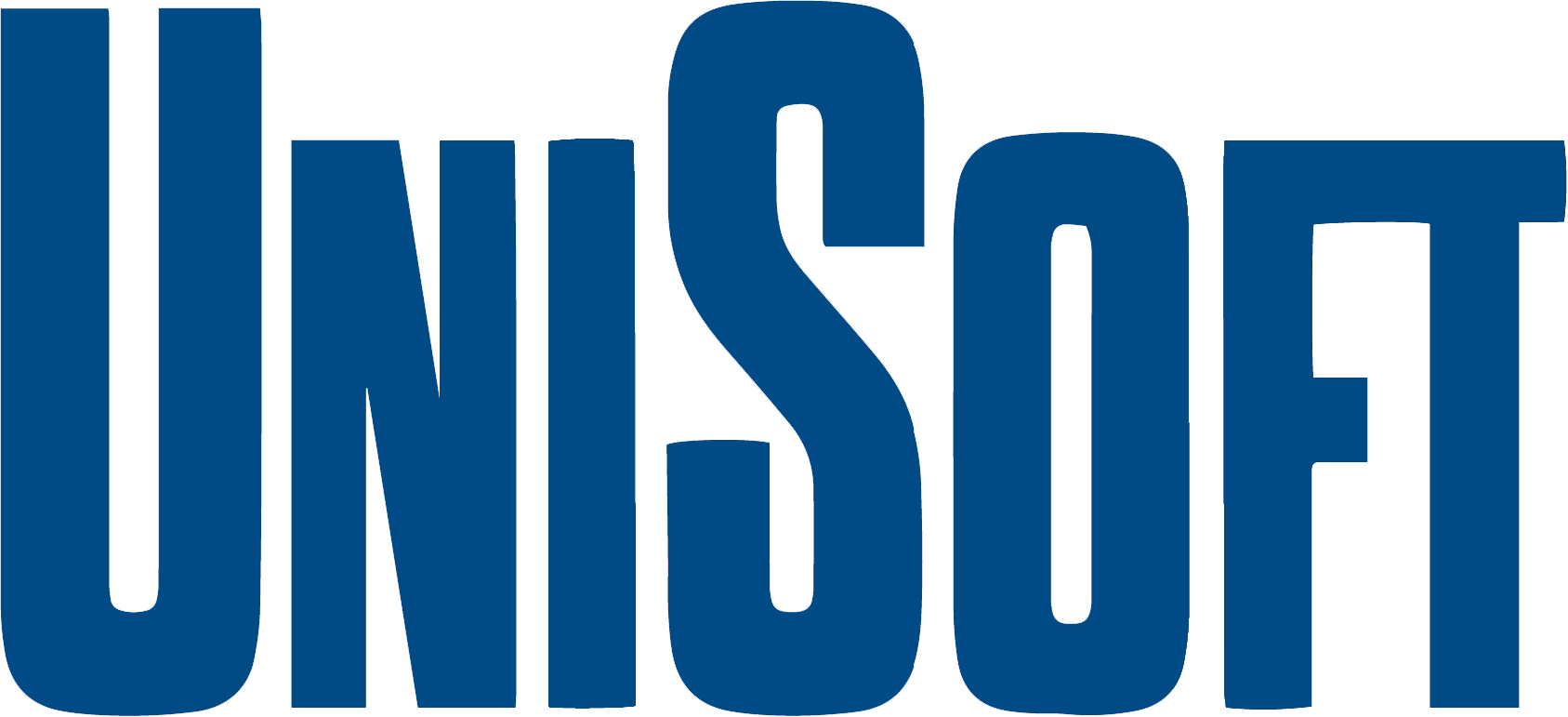
- Industry: Software development
- Founded: October 5, 1981; 45 years ago in Emeryville, California
- Headquarters: Millbrae, California, U.S.
- Website: unisoft.com

UniSoft Corporation is an American software developer established in 1981, originally focused on the development of Unix ports for various computer architectures. Based in Millbrae, California, it now builds standardization and conformance testing applications for the digital television market.

== History ==
UniSoft was founded on October 5, 1981, in Emeryville, California. Their original business was Unix development, and they were soon recognized as one of the early implementers of Unix for the emerging 16-bit microcomputer market. By 1989, they had completed over 225 Unix implementations on various hardware platforms, which was estimated to have been about 65% of all such ports. UniSoft's port of Version 7 Unix was the first operating system for Sun Microsystems' Sun-1 workstations and servers. It also developed Apple Inc.'s Unix variant, A/UX, for the Apple Macintosh II.

Uniplus+ was a commercial version of the Unix System III and System V operating systems that was available in the 1980s. It ran on the MC68000 Motorola chipset on Torch Triple X, the Apple Lisa, among other machines. It served as the basis of Silicon Graphics' GL2 operating system, which eventually evolved into IRIX.

In 1991, the company moved to its current offices in Millbrae, California. Although seeking to enter the market for Unix products on RISC-based systems, such as a version of System V Release 4 for MIPS, the company was unable to maintain the same level of revenue as it had in targeting the 68000 family, eventually leading to a restructuring of the company ownership and a shift towards testing and verification suite development. UniSoft shifted its focus to the television industry in 1997, in order to address standards compliant software in that market. It now works solely in development, testing, and broadcast tools for digital television.

== See also ==
- Callan Data Systems
