= Chris Serle =

British television presenter (1943–2024)

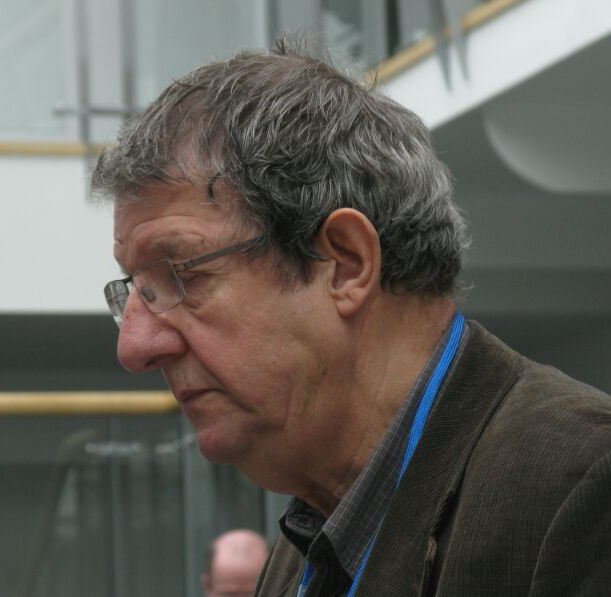
- Serle in 2012
- Born: Christopher Richard Serle; 13 July 1943; Bristol, England
- Died: 16 September 2024 (aged 81)
- Education: Trinity College, Dublin
- Occupations: Television presenter; actor
- Height: 6 ft 5 in (1.96 m)
- Spouses: Anna Southall (m. 1983; div. 2003); Ali Fraser
- Children: 5

Christopher Richard Serle (13 July 1943 – 16 September 2024) was a British television presenter, reporter, and actor, best known for being a presenter on That's Life!

== Early life and career ==
Serle was born in Henleaze, Bristol, on 13 July 1943. He was educated at Clifton College and Trinity College, Dublin, where he studied modern languages. He appeared as a foil for Irish comedian Dave Allen in his series Dave Allen at Large in 1971, but gained greater UK public recognition as one of the presenters on the TV series That's Life!. He later presented a series in which he, and fellow former That's Life! presenter Paul Heiney, were pitched into professional situations with no prior knowledge in In at the Deep End.

In the 1980s, he presented Windmill in which clips from the BBC archives on particular themes were shown (so called as the then base for BBC archives was in Windmill Road, Brentford). He also presented the viewer-response show Points of View, The Computer Programme, and Monkey Business. On radio, he was the regular host of Pick of the Week between 1991 and 1998, and a frequent guest presenter until 2006. He was also the interviewer and host of the BBC series Greek Language and People with Katia Dandoulaki. From 2005 he served as the honorary president of the Bristol Hospital Broadcasting Service, a registered charity which provides a radio service to the hospitals of Bristol.

Serle featured on an episode of the BBC game show, The Adventure Game, with Sandra Dickinson and Adam Tandy on 16 February 1984. He also presented BBC Radio Bristol's The Afternoon Show for several years.

Serle also presented the first series of the ITV gameshow Runway (1987).

== Personal life and death ==
In 1983, Serle married Anna Southall, a member of the Cadbury family; they had two children and divorced in 2003. He then married television producer Ali Fraser, and they had three children. He was president of the Atwell-Wilson Motor Museum.

Serle died from a stroke on 16 September 2024, at the age of 81.
