= BBC Micro =

Series of British microcomputers by Acorn

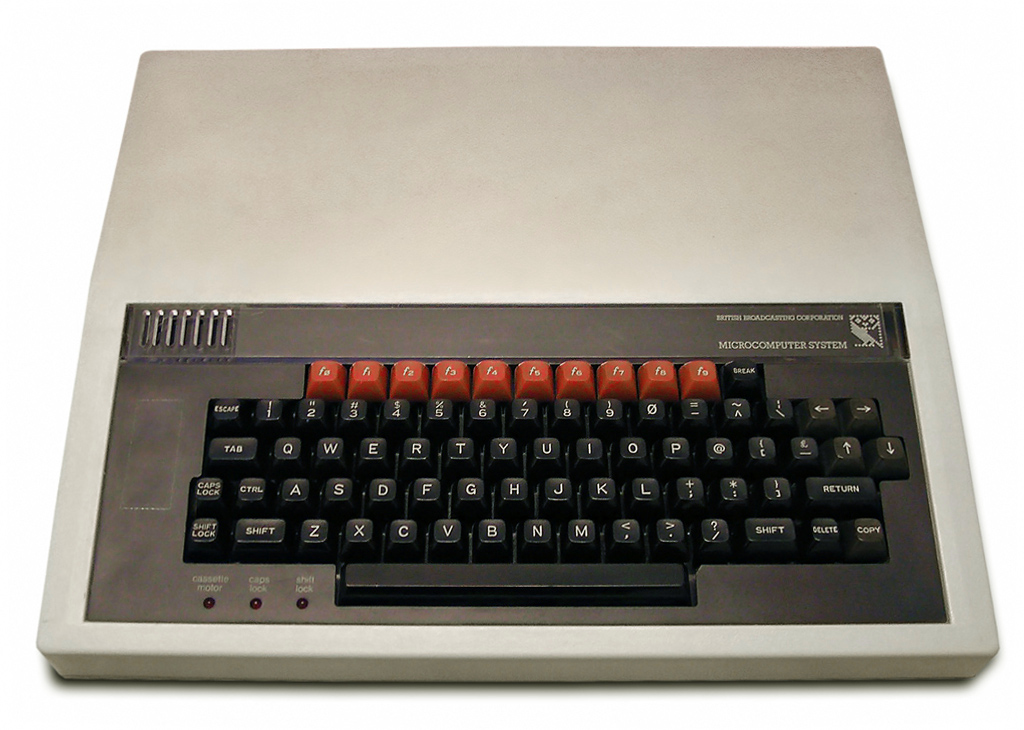
- Model A/B (standard configuration)
- Developer: BBC
- Manufacturer: Acorn Computers
- Type: 8-bit home computer
- Released: 1 December 1981; 44 years ago
- Lifespan: 1981–1994
- Introductory price: Model A – £235 (equivalent to £906 in 2025); Model B – £335 (equivalent to £1,291 in 2025)
- Discontinued: 1994; 32 years ago
- Units sold: Over 1.5 million
- Media: Cassette tape, floppy disk (optional) – 5 1/4-inch or (later) 3 1/2-inch, hard disk also known as 'Winchester' (rare), Laserdisc (BBC Domesday Project)
- Operating system: Acorn MOS
- CPU: 2 MHz MOS Technology 6502/6512
- Memory: 16–32 KiB (Model A/B); 64–128 KiB (Model B+); 128 KiB (Master); Plus 32–128 KB ROM, expandable to 272 KiB
- Storage: 100–800 KB (DFS); 160–1280 KB (ADFS floppy disks); 20 MB (ADFS hard disk)
- Display: PAL/NTSC, UHF/composite/TTL RGB
- Graphics: 640×256, max. 8 colours (Motorola 6845, various framebuffer modes); 78×75, 8 colours (Mullard SAA5050 Teletext chip)
- Sound: Texas Instruments SN76489, 4 channels, mono; TMS5220 speech synthesiser with phrase ROM (optional)
- Input: Keyboard, twin analogue joysticks with fire buttons, lightpen
- Connectivity: Printer parallel, RS-423 serial, user parallel, Econet (optional), 1 MHz bus, Tube second processor interface
- Power: 50 W
- Predecessor: Acorn Atom
- Successor: Acorn Archimedes
- Related: Acorn Electron

The BBC Microcomputer System, or BBC Micro, is a family of microcomputers developed and manufactured by Acorn Computers in the early 1980s as part of the BBC's Computer Literacy Project. Launched in December 1981, it was showcased across several educational BBC television programmes, such as The Computer Programme (1982), Making the Most of the Micro and Computers in Control (both 1983), and Micro Live (1985). Created in response to the BBC's call for bids for a microcomputer to complement its broadcasts and printed material, Acorn secured the contract with its rapidly prototyped "Proton" system, which was subsequently renamed the BBC Micro.

Although it was announced towards the end of 1981, production issues initially delayed the fulfilment of many orders, causing deliveries to spill over into 1982. Nicknamed the "Beeb", it soon became a fixture in British schools, advancing the BBC's goal of improving computer literacy. Renowned for its strong build quality and extensive connectivity, including ports for peripherals, support for Econet networking, and the option of second processors via the Tube interface, the BBC Micro was offered in two main variants: the 16 KB Model A (initially priced at £299) and the more popular 32 KB Model B (priced at £399). Although it was costlier than many other home computers of the era, it sold over 1.5 million units, boosted by the BBC's brand recognition and the machine's adaptability.

The BBC Micro's impact on education in the United Kingdom was notable, with most schools in Britain acquiring at least one unit, exposing a generation of pupils to computing fundamentals. Central to this was its built-in BBC BASIC programming language, known for its robust feature set and accessible syntax. As a home system, the BBC also fostered a community of enthusiasts who benefited from its flexible architecture, which supported everything from disk interfaces to speech synthesis. Through these expansions and its broader software library, the BBC Micro had a major impact in the development of the UK's home-grown software industry.

Acorn's engineers used the BBC Micro as both a development platform and a reference design to simulate their pioneering ARM architecture, now one of the most widely deployed CPU designs worldwide. This work influenced the rapid evolution of RISC-based processing in mobile devices, embedded systems, and beyond, making the BBC Micro an important stepping stone in computing.

The BBC Micro had multiple display modes, including a Teletext-based Mode 7 that used minimal memory, and came with a full-travel keyboard and ten user-configurable function keys. Hardware interfaces were catered for with standard analogue inputs, a serial and parallel port, and a cassette interface that followed the CUTS (Computer Users Tape Standard) variation of the Kansas City standard. In total, nine BBC-branded microcomputer models were released, although the term "BBC Micro" generally refers to the first six versions (Model A, B, B+64, B+128, Master 128, and Master Compact). Later BBC models are typically classed as part of Acorn's Archimedes line.

== History ==
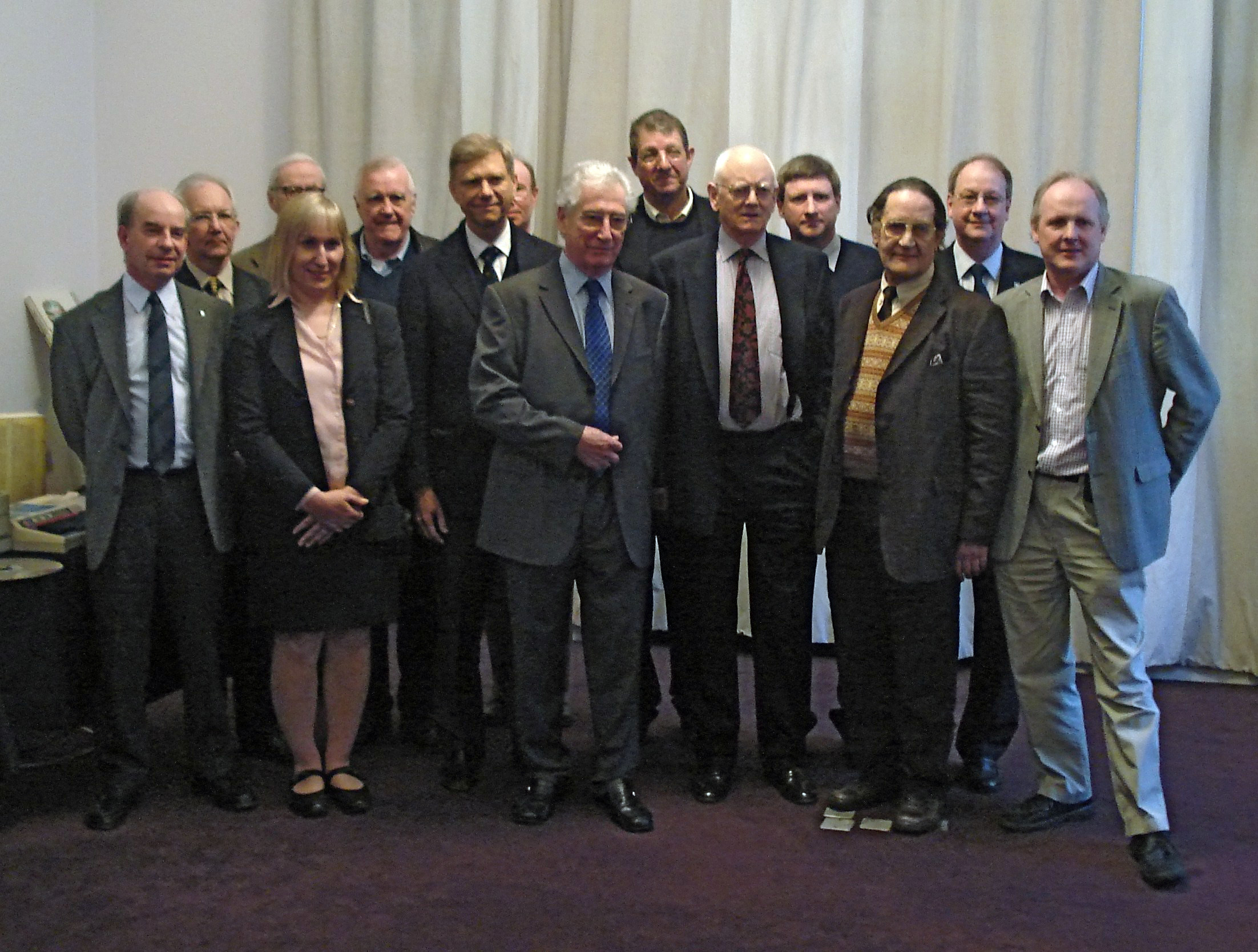
Some of the BBC Micro team in 2008

During the early 1980s, the BBC started what became known as the BBC Computer Literacy Project. The project was initiated partly in response to an ITV documentary series The Mighty Micro, in which Christopher Evans of the UK's National Physical Laboratory predicted the coming microcomputer revolution and its effect on the economy, industry, and lifestyle of the United Kingdom.

The BBC Computer Literacy Project had been conceived by the BBC's Continuing Education Television department. With funding from the Manpower Services Commission, the department undertook research which culminated in the publication of the Microelectronics report in 1979, which was issued to all United Kingdom MPs. The underlying philosophy from the report was that people should learn how to use and control computers, rather than feel dominated by them.

The BBC wanted to base its project on a microcomputer capable of performing various tasks which they could then demonstrate in the TV series The Computer Programme. The list of topics included programming, graphics, sound and music, teletext, controlling external hardware, and artificial intelligence. It developed an ambitious specification for a BBC computer, and discussed the project with several companies including Acorn Computers, Sinclair Research, Newbury Laboratories, Tangerine Computer Systems, and Dragon Data.

The introduction of a specific microcomputer to a more general computer literacy initiative was a topic of controversy, however, with criticism aimed at the BBC for promoting a specific commercial product and for going beyond the "traditional BBC pattern" of promoting existing information networks of training and education providers. Accusations were even levelled at the Department of Industry for making the BBC "an arm of Government industrial policy" and using the Computer Literacy Project as a way of "funding industry through the back door", obscuring public financial support on behalf of a government that was ostensibly opposed to subsidising industry.

The Acorn team had already been working on a successor to their existing Atom microcomputer. Known as the Proton, it included better graphics and a faster 2 MHz MOS Technology 6502 central processing unit. The machine was only at the design stage at the time, and the Acorn team, including Steve Furber and Sophie Wilson, had one week to build a working prototype from the sketched designs. The team worked through the night to get a working Proton together to show the BBC. Although the BBC expected a computer with the Zilog Z80 CPU and CP/M operating system, not the Proton's 6502 CPU and proprietary operating system, the Proton was the only machine to fulfil the BBC's specification, actually exceeding it in nearly every parameter.

Based on the Proton prototype, the BBC signed a contract with Acorn as early as February 1981; by June the BBC Micro's specifications and pricing were decided. As a concession to the BBC's expectation of "industry standard" compatibility with CP/M, apparently under the direction of John Coll, the Tube interface was incorporated into the design, enabling a Z80 second processor to be added. A new contract between Acorn and BBC Enterprises was agreed in 1984 for another four-year term, with other manufacturers having tendered for the deal. An Acorn representative admitted that the BBC Model B would not be competitive throughout the term of the renewed contract, and that a successor would emerge.

The OS ROM v1.0 contains the following ASCII credits string (code here):

(C) 1981 Acorn Computers Ltd.Thanks are due to the following contributors to the development of the BBC Computer (among others too numerous to mention):- David Allen,Bob Austin,Ram Banerjee,Paul Bond,Allen Boothroyd,Cambridge,Cleartone,John Coll,John Cox,Andy Cripps,Chris Curry,6502 designers,Jeremy Dion,Tim Dobson,Joe Dunn,Paul Farrell,Ferranti,Steve Furber,Jon Gibbons,Andrew Gordon,Lawrence Hardwick,Dylan Harris,Hermann Hauser,Hitachi,Andy Hopper,ICL,Martin Jackson,Brian Jones,Chris Jordan,David King,David Kitson,Paul Kriwaczek,Computer Laboratory,Peter Miller,Arthur Norman,Glyn Phillips,Mike Prees,John Radcliffe,Wilberforce Road,Peter Robinson,Richard Russell,Kim Spence-Jones,Graham Tebby,Jon Thackray,Chris Turner,Adrian Warner,Roger Wilson,Alan Wright.

Additionally, the last bytes of the BASIC read-only memory (ROM; v2 and v4) include the word "Roger", which is a reference to Sophie Wilson whose name at the time was Roger Wilson.

== Market impact ==
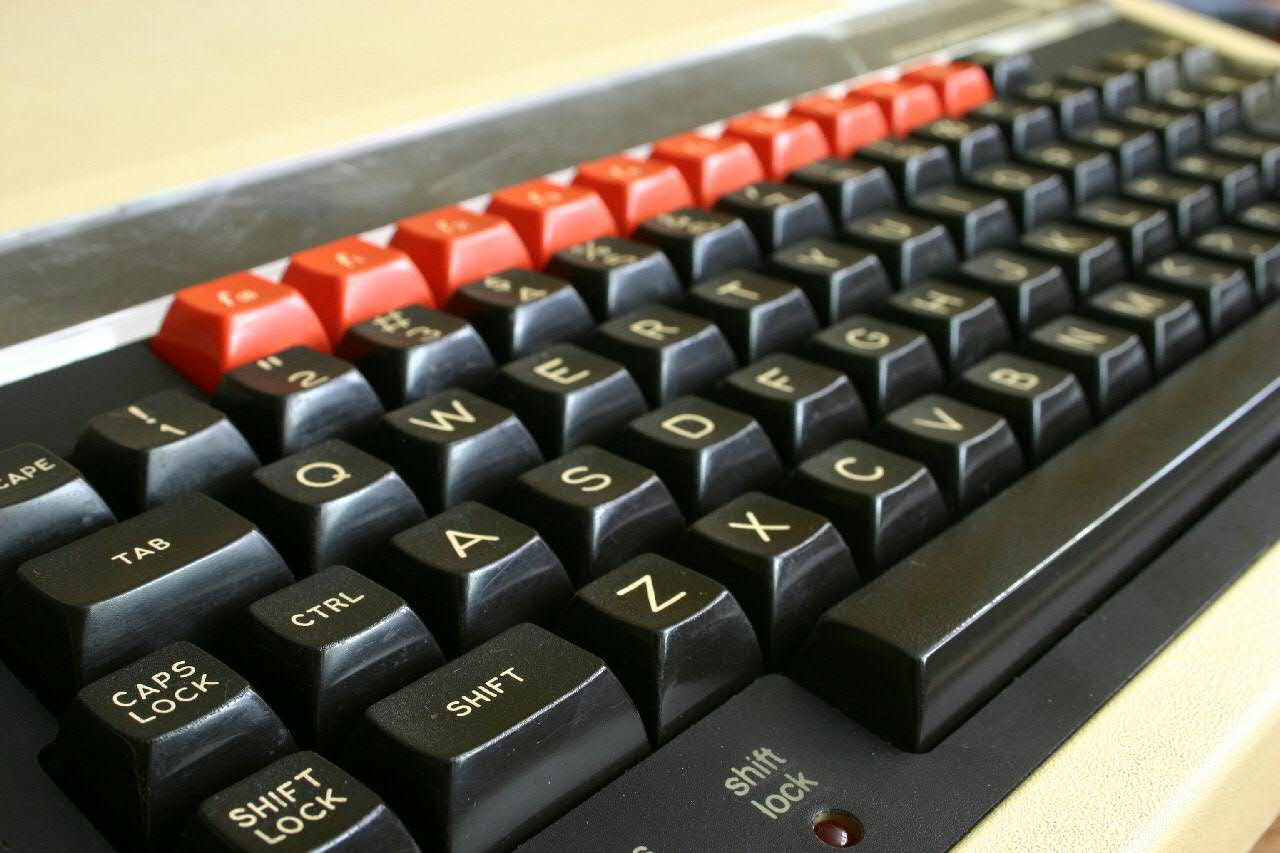
Keyboard of a Model B, one of two very similar designs used on the model

The machine was released as the BBC Microcomputer on 1 December 1981, although production problems pushed delivery of the majority of the initial run into 1982. Nicknamed "the Beeb", it was popular in the UK, especially in the educational market; in 1985 about 80% of British schools had a BBC microcomputer.

Byte called the BBC Micro Model B "a no-compromise computer that has many uses beyond self-instruction in computer technology". It called the Tube interface "the most innovative feature" of the computer, and concluded that "although some other British microcomputers offer more features for a given price, none of them surpass the BBC ... in terms of versatility and expansion capability". As with Sinclair Research's ZX Spectrum and Commodore International's Commodore 64, both released the next year, in 1982, demand greatly exceeded supply. For some months, there were long delays before customers received the machines they had ordered.

=== Export initiatives ===
Efforts were made to market the machine in the United States and West Germany. Acorn's strategy in the US focused on the education market, worth a reported $700 million, by offering the BBC Micro in an upgraded form of the Model B with an expanded ROM, speech synthesis hardware, and built-in Econet interface for a price of $995, complementing this with the provision of software and materials designed to support teaching and to encourage adoption by teachers "fearful" of computers or skeptical of the role of computers in the curriculum.

By October 1983, the US operation reported that American schools had placed orders with it totalling $21 million. In one deployment in Lowell, Massachusetts valued at $177,000, 138 BBC Micros were installed in eight of the 27 schools in the city, with the computer's networking capabilities, educational credentials, and the availability of software with "high education quality" accompanied by "useful lesson plans and workbooks" all given as reasons for selecting Acorn's machine in preference to the competition from IBM, Apple, and Commodore. Another deployment in Phoenix, Arizona valued at $174,697 saw 175 BBC Micros installed, with the local Acorn dealer predicting sales worth $2 million in the next two years, of which around 85 to 90 percent would be made into education, the remainder going to the small business market. In early 1984, Acorn claimed a US network of more than 1,000 dealers, also reporting "over $50 million worth of education orders for the BBC Micro system" for which 200 educational titles were being offered.

In October 1984, while preparing a major expansion of its US dealer network, Acorn claimed sales of 85 per cent of the computers in British schools, and delivery of 40,000 machines per month. That December, Acorn stated its intention to become the market leader in US educational computing. The New York Times considered the inclusion of local area networking to be of prime importance to teachers. The operation resulted in advertisements by at least one dealer in Interface Age magazine, but ultimately the attempt failed.

The success of the machine in the UK was due largely to its acceptance as an "educational" computer – UK schools used BBC Micros to teach computer literacy, information technology skills. Acorn became more known for its BBC Model B computer than for its other products. Some Commonwealth countries, including India, started their own computer literacy programmes around 1984. Intending to avoid "re-inventing the wheel", such efforts adopted the BBC Micro in order to take immediate advantage of the extensive range of software already developed under the United Kingdom's own literacy initiative, proposing that software tailored for local requirements would ultimately also be developed. A clone of the BBC Micro was produced by Semiconductor Complex Limited and named the SCL Unicorn. Another Indian computer manufacturer, Hope Computers Pvt Ltd, made a BBC Micro clone called the Dolphin. Unlike the original BBC Micro, the Dolphin featured blue function keys.

Production agreements were made with both SCL in India and distributor Harry Mazal in Mexico for the assembly of BBC Micro units from kits of parts, leading to full-scale manufacturing, with SCL also planning to fabricate the 6502 CPU under licence from Rockwell. According to reporting from early 1985, "several thousand Beebs a month" were being produced in India. Meanwhile, the eventual production arrangement in Mexico involved local manufacturer Datum (a company founded by Harry Mazal and others, initially to act as ICL's Mexican distributor), aiming to assemble 2000 units per month by May 1985, with the initial assembly intended to lead to the manufacture of all aspects of the machines apart from Acorn's proprietary ULA components. Such machines were intended for the Mexican and South American markets, potentially also appealing to those south-western states of the US having large Spanish-speaking populations. Ultimately, upon Acorn's withdrawal from the US in 1986, Datum would continue manufacturing at a level of 7000 to 8000 Spanish-language machines per year for the North and South American markets.

=== Pricing and adoption ===
The initial strategy for the BBC's computer literacy endeavour involved the marketing of the "Acorn Proton-based BBC microcomputer for less than £200". The Model A and the Model B were initially priced at £235 and £335 respectively, but increased almost immediately to £299 and £399 due to higher costs. Considered in modern terms by adjusting for inflation, this made the Model B price equivalent to £1,538 in 2025. Acorn anticipated total sales to be around 12,000 units, but eventually more than 1.5 million BBC Micros were sold. The cost of the BBC Models was high compared to competitors such as the ZX Spectrum and the Commodore 64, and from 1983 on, Acorn attempted to counter this by producing a simplified but largely compatible version intended for home use, complementing the use of the BBC Micro in schools: the 32K Acorn Electron.

=== The ITV Micro ===
The involvement of the BBC in microcomputing also initiated tentative plans by the independent television companies of the ITV network to introduce their own initiative and rival computing system, with a CP/M-based system proposed by Transam Computers under consideration for such an initiative by the Independent Television Companies Association at a late 1983 meeting. The proposed machine would have been priced at £399, matching that of the BBC Model B, and was reported as offering 64 KB of RAM, a disc interface, and serial and parallel interfaces, itself being a "low-cost development" of an existing machine, the Transam Tuscan, which included dual floppy drives and cost £1,700.

This proposal was voted down by the ITV companies, citing a possible contravention of the companies' obligations under broadcasting regulations prohibiting sponsorship, along with concerns about a conflict of interest with advertisers of computer products. Despite denials of involvement with ITV from Prism Microproducts, the company had already been pursuing a joint venture with Transam on a product rumoured to be under consideration by the broadcasting group. This product, a business system subsequently known as the Wren, had reportedly been positioned as such an "ITV Micro" towards the end of 1983, also to be offered in a home variant with ORACLE teletext reception capabilities. However, not all ITV franchise holders were equally enthusiastic about scheduling programmes related to microcomputing or about pursuing a computer retailing strategy.

== Description ==
=== Hardware features: Models A and B ===
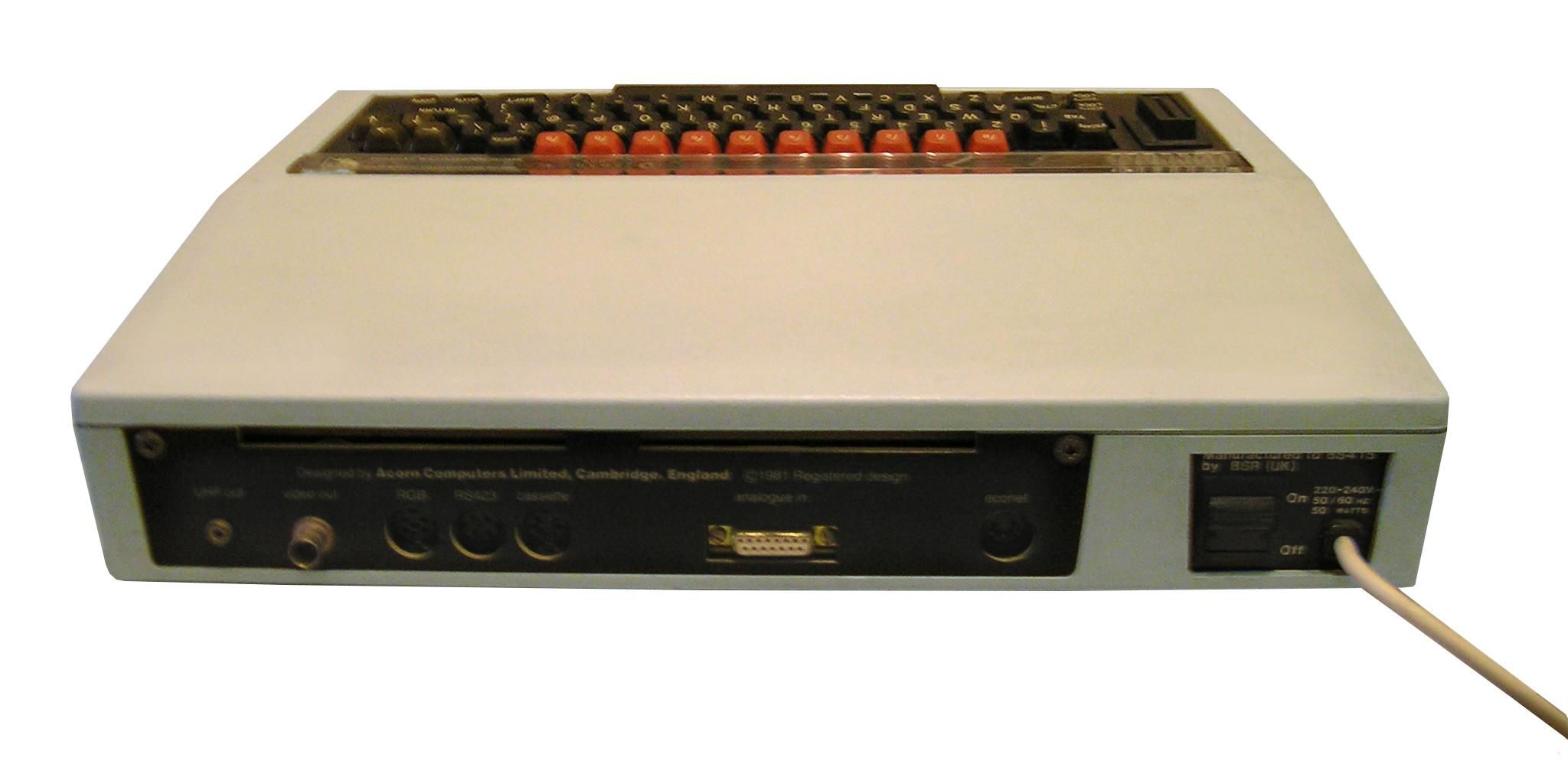
Rear of the BBC Micro. Ports from left to right: UHF out, video out, RGB, RS-423, cassette tape, analogue in and Econet.

A key feature of the BBC Micro's design is the high-performance random-access memory (RAM) it is equipped with. A common design note in 6502-based computers of the era was to use a RAM access rate of twice the clock frequency of the CPU. This allowed the CPU and a separate video display controller to alternate access to the memory. In this way, the CPU and display circuitry could share access to RAM through carefully planned timing that let the CPU run at its full memory speed without wait states. This technique was used, for example, on the Apple II Plus and the early Commodore models.

The BBC machine, however, was designed to run at the faster CPU speed, 2 MHz, double that of these earlier machines. In this case, bus contention is normally an issue, as there is not enough time for the CPU to access the memory during the period when the video hardware is idle. Some machines of the era accept the inherent performance hit, as was the case for the Amstrad CPC, Atari 8-bit computers, and to a lesser extent the ZX Spectrum. Others, like the MSX systems, used entirely separate pools of memory for the CPU and video, slowing access between the two.

Furber believed that the Acorn design should have a flat memory model and allow the CPU and video system to access the bus without interfering with each other. To do so, the RAM had to allow four million access cycles per second. Hitachi was the only company considering a DRAM which ran at that speed, the HM4816. To equip the prototype machine, the only four 4816s in the country were hand-carried by the Hitachi representative to Acorn.

The National Semiconductor 81LS95 multiplexer was needed for the high memory speed. Furber recalled that competitors came to Acorn offering to replace the component with their own, but "none of them worked. And we never knew why. Which of course, means we didn't know why the National Semiconductor one did work correctly. And a million and a half BBC Micros later, it was still working, and I still didn't know why". Another mystery was the 6502's data bus. The prototype BBC Micro exceeded the CPU's specifications, causing it to fail. The designers found that putting a finger on a certain place on the motherboard caused the prototype to work. Acorn put a resistor pack across the data bus, which Furber described as "'the engineer's finger' and again, we have no idea why it's necessary, and a million and a half machines later it's still working, so nobody asked any questions".

The Model A shipped with 16 KB of user RAM, while the Model B had 32 KB. Extra ROMs could be fitted (four on the PCB or sixteen with expansion hardware) and accessed via paged memory.

The machines included three video ports, one with an RF modulator sending out a signal in the UHF band, another sending composite video suitable for connection to computer monitors, and a separate RGB video port. The separate RGB video out socket was an engineering requirement from the BBC to allow the machine to directly output a broadcast quality signal for use within television programming; it was used on episodes of The Computer Programme and Making the Most of the Micro.

The computer included several input/output (I/O) interfaces: serial and parallel printer ports, an 8-bit general purpose digital I/O port, a port offering four analogue inputs, a light pen input, and an expansion connector (the "1 MHz bus") which enabled other hardware to be connected. An Econet network interface and a disk drive interface were available as options. All motherboards had space for the electronic components, but Econet was rarely installed.

Additionally, an Acorn proprietary interface named the "Tube" allowed a second processor to be added. Three models of second processor were offered by Acorn, based on the 6502, Z80 and 32016 CPUs. The Tube was used for third-party add-ons, including a Z80 board and hard disk drive from Torch that allowed the BBC machine to run CP/M programs.

Separate pages, each with a codename, are used to control the access to the I/O:

Codename	Page	Description
FRED	0xFC00 – 0xFCFF	1 MHz bus
JIM	0xFD00 – 0xFDFF	1 MHz bus / paged RAM
SHEILA	0xFE00 – 0xFEFF	Mapped I/O for resident hardware – video, cassette, sound, interrupts

The Tube interface allowed Acorn to use BBC Micros with ARM CPUs as software development machines when creating the Acorn Archimedes. This resulted in the ARM development kit for the BBC Micro in 1986, priced at around £4000. From 2006, a kit with an ARM7TDMI CPU running at 64 MHz, with as much as 64 MB of RAM, was released for the BBC Micro and Master, using the Tube interface to upgrade the 8-bit micros to 32-bit RISC machines. Among the software that operated on the Tube are an enhanced version of the Elite video game and a computer-aided design system that required a second 6502 CPU and a 3-dimensional joystick named a "Bitstik".

The Model A and the Model B were built on the same printed circuit board (PCB), and a Model A can be upgraded to a Model B. Users wishing to operate Model B software need to add the extra RAM and the user/printer MOS Technology 6522 VIA (which many games use for timers) and snip a link, a task that can be achieved without soldering. To do a full upgrade with all the external ports requires soldering the connectors to the motherboard. The original machines shipped with "OS 0.1", with later updates advertised in magazines, supplied as a clip-in integrated circuit, with the last official version being "OS 1.2". Variations in the Acorn OS exist as a result of home-made projects and modified machines can still be bought on Internet auction sites such as eBay as of 2011.

The BBC Model A was phased out of production with the introduction of the Acorn Electron, with chairman Chris Curry stating at the time that Acorn "would no longer promote it" (the Model A).

Early BBC Micros used linear power supplies at the insistence of the BBC, which, as a broadcaster, was cautious about electromagnetic interference. The supplies were unreliable, and after a few months the BBC allowed switched-mode units.

An apparent oversight in the manufacturing process resulted in many Model Bs producing a constant buzzing noise from the built-in speaker. This fault can be rectified partly by soldering a resistor across two pads.

There are five developments of the main BBC Micro circuit board that addressed various issues through the model's production, from 'Issue 1' through to 'Issue 7' with variants 5 and 6 not being released. The 1985 'BBC Microcomputer Service Manual' from Acorn documents the details of the technical changes.

Per Watford Electronics comments in their '32K Ram Board Manual':

Early issue BBCs (Issue 3 circuit boards and before) are notorious for out of specification timings. If problems occur with this sort of machine, the problem can generally be cured by the use of either a Rockwell 6502A CPU chip, or by replacing IC14 (a 74LS245) with either another 74LS245 or the faster 74ALS245.

==== Export models ====
Advert in Interface Age magazine, November 1983, 'The BBC Microcomputer Is Here!'

Two export models were developed: one for the US, with Econet and speech hardware as standard; the other for West Germany. Despite concerns of unsuitability for the Australian market, with the design failing at temperatures above 35 °C (95 °F), the machine was still "widely used in Australian schools". Export models were fitted with radio frequency shielding as required by the respective countries.

From June 1983, the name was always spelled out completely ("British Broadcasting Corporation Microcomputer System") to avoid confusion with Brown, Boveri & Cie in international markets. This came after warnings from the Swiss multinational not to market the computer with the BBC label in West Germany, effectively obliging Acorn to relabel "hundreds of machines" to comply with these demands.

US models include the BASIC III ROM chip, modified to accept the American spelling of COLOR, but the height of the graphics display was reduced to 200 scan lines to suit NTSC TVs, severely affecting applications written for British computers. After the failed US marketing campaign, the unwanted machines were remanufactured for the British market and sold, resulting in a third export variant.

==== Side product ====
In October 1984, the Acorn Business Computer (ABC)/Acorn Cambridge Workstation range of machines was announced, based primarily on BBC hardware.

=== Hardware features: successor models ===
==== B+64 and B+128 ====
In mid-1985, Acorn introduced the Model B+ which increased the total RAM to 64 KB. This had a modest market impact and received a rather unsympathetic reception, with one reviewer's assessment being that the machine was "18 months too late" and that it "must be seen as a stop gap", and others criticising the elevated price of £500 (compared to the £400 of the original Model B) in the face of significantly cheaper competition providing as much or even twice as much memory. The extra RAM in the Model B+ is assigned as two blocks, a block of 20 KB dedicated solely for screen display (so-called shadow RAM) and a block of 12 KB of special sideways RAM. The B+128, introduced towards the end of 1985, comes with an additional 64 KB (4 × 16 KB sideways RAM banks) to give a total RAM of 128 KB.

The B+ is incapable of running some original BBC B programs and games, such as the very popular Castle Quest. A particular problem is the replacement of the Intel 8271 floppy-disk controller with the Western Digital 1770: not only was the new controller mapped to different addresses, it is fundamentally incompatible, and the 8271 emulators that existed supported only a rudimentary set of operations. Software that uses copy protection techniques involving direct access to the controller does not operate on the new system. Acorn attempted to alleviate this, starting with version 2.20 of the 1770 DFS, via an 8271-backward-compatible Ctrl+Z+Break option.

There is also a long-running problem late in the B/B+'s commercial life infamous amongst B+ owners, when Superior Software released Repton Infinity, which did not run on the B+. A series of unsuccessful replacements were issued before one compatible with both was finally released.

==== BBC Master ====
During 1986, Acorn followed up with the BBC Master, which offers memory sizes from 128 KB and many other improvements on the 1981 BBC Micro. It has essentially the same 6502-based BBC architecture but with many of the upgrades supported by the original design (extra ROM software, extra paged RAM, second processors) now included on the circuit board as internal plug-in modules.

=== Software ===
Elite (Acornsoft, 1984). The unusual game screen used two display modes at once, to show both detail and colour.

The BBC Micro platform amassed a large software base of both games and educational programs for its two main uses as a home and educational computer. Notable examples of each include the original release of Elite and Granny's Garden. Programming languages and some applications were supplied on ROM chips to be installed on the motherboard. These load instantly and leave the RAM free for programs or documents.

Although appropriate content was little-supported by television broadcasters, telesoftware could be downloaded via the optional Teletext Adapter and the third-party teletext adaptors that emerged.

The built-in operating system, Acorn MOS, provides an extensive API to interface with all standard peripherals, ROM-based software, and the screen. Features specific to some versions of BASIC, like vector graphics, keyboard macros, cursor-based editing, sound queues, and envelopes, are in the MOS ROM and made available to any application. BBC BASIC itself, being in a separate ROM, can be replaced with another language.

BASIC, other languages, and utility ROM chips reside in any of four 16 KB paged ROM sockets, with OS support for sixteen sockets via expansion hardware. The five (total) sockets are located partly obscured under the keyboard, with the leftmost socket hard-wired for the OS. The intended purpose for the perforated panel on the left of the keyboard was for a Serial ROM or Speech ROM. The paged ROM system is essentially modular. A language-independent system of star commands, prefixed with an asterisk, provides the ability to select a language (for example *BASIC, *PASCAL), a filing system (*TAPE, *DISC), change settings (*FX, *OPT), or carry out ROM-supplied tasks (*COPY, *BACKUP) from the command line. The MOS recognises certain built-in commands, and polls the paged ROMs in descending order for service otherwise; if none of them claims the command, then the OS returns a Bad command error. Suitable ROM (or EPROM) images could be written and provide functions without requiring RAM for the code itself.

Not all ROMs offer star commands (ROMs containing data files, for instance), but any ROM can "hook" into vectors to enhance the system's functionality. Often the ROM is a device driver for mass storage combined with a filing system, starting with Acorn's 1982 Disc Filing System (DFS) which API became the de facto standard for floppy-disc access. The Acorn Graphics Extension ROM (GXR) expands the VDU routines to draw geometric shapes, flood fills, and sprites. During 1985, Micro Power designed and marketed a Basic Extension ROM, introducing statements such as WHILE, ENDWHILE, CASE, WHEN, OTHERWISE, ENDCASE, and direct mode commands including VERIFY.

Acorn strongly discouraged programmers from directly accessing the system variables and hardware, favouring official system calls. This was ostensibly to make sure programs keep working when migrated to coprocessors that utilise the Tube interface, but it also makes BBC Micro software more portable across the Acorn range. Whereas untrappable PEEKs and POKEs are used by other computers to reach the system elements, programs in either machine code or BBC BASIC instead pass parameters to an operating system routine. In this way, the 6502 can translate the request for the local machine or send it across the Tube interface, as direct access is impossible from the coprocessor. Published programs largely conform to the API except for games, which routinely engage with the hardware for greater speed, and require a particular Acorn model.

Many schools and universities employed the machines in Econet networks, and so networked multiplayer games were possible. Few became popular, due to the limited number of machines aggregated in one place. A relatively late but well documented example can be found in a dissertation based on a ringed RS-423 interconnect.

==== BBC BASIC built-in programming language ====
BASIC prompt after switch-on or hard reset

The built-in ROM-resident BBC BASIC programming language interpreter realised the system's educational emphasis and was key to its success; it is the most comprehensive BASIC compared to other contemporary implementations, and runs very efficiently. Advanced programs can be written without resorting to non-structured programming or machine code. Should one want or need to program in assembly language, BBC BASIC has a built-in assembler that allows a mix of BASIC and assembly language for the processor on which a particular implementation of BASIC is running.

When the BBC Micro was released, many competing home computers used Microsoft BASIC, or variants typically designed to resemble it. Compared to Microsoft BASIC, BBC BASIC features IF...THEN...ELSE, REPEAT...UNTIL, and named procedures and functions, but retains GOTO and GOSUB for compatibility. It also supports high-resolution graphics, four-channel sound, pointer-based memory access (borrowed from BCPL), and rudimentary macro assembly. Long variable names are accepted and distinguished completely, not just by the first two characters.

==== Other languages ====
Acorn had made a point of not just supporting BBC Basic but also supporting a number of contemporary languages, some of which were supplied as ROM chips to fit the spare sideways ROM sockets on the motherboard. Other languages were supplied on tape or disk.

Programming languages from Acornsoft included:

- ISO Pascal (2× 16 KB ROM + floppy disk)
- S-Pascal (disk or tape)
- BCPL (ROM plus further optional disk based modules)
- Forth (16 KB ROM)
- LISP (disk, tape, or ROM)
- Logo (2× 16 KB ROM)
- Turtle Graphics (disk or tape)
- Micro-Prolog (16 KB ROM)
- COMAL (16 KB ROM)
- C (disk)

Many of these languages were also provided under the Panos environment for the 32016 Second Processor. As the Z80 Second Processor provided a CP/M environment, languages available for CP/M were supportable via this route. For example, Turbo Pascal was regarded in one instance as "by far the best version of Pascal" for a BBC Micro with Z80 second processor. DOS-based language implementations such as Turbo C and Turbo Pascal could also be run by computers expanded with the Master 512 board, this being fitted to BBC Micro machines using a Universal Second Processor unit.

Torch Computers' Z80 expansions supported the UCSD p-System, and the Torch Unicorn expansion provided a Unix environment that featured a C compiler and other utilities, with Pascal and Fortran 77 implementations also advertised. Acornsoft also supplied a p-System product, developed by TDI, that required a 6502 Second Processor and at least one single-sided, 80-track disc drive. Acornsoft's p-System implementation corresponded to version IV.12 and also included a Fortran 77 compiler.

Acornsoft C did not run on the original BBC Micro models, requiring the extra resources provided by the B+ and Master series machines. Beebug C did, however, run on the standard Model B and later machines. Both of these implementations provided compilers producing interpreted "p-code" as opposed to machine code, similar to Acornsoft's ISO Pascal and BCPL compilers. A Small-C implementation was also made available by Mijas.

For a BBC Micro without a second processor, Acornsoft's ISO Pascal primarily saw competition from Oxford Pascal. A Forth-based Pascal implementation from HCCS known as Pascal T was regarded as being "intended primarily for learning Pascal, rather than using it seriously", putting it in the same category as Acornsoft's S-Pascal, described as "a simple subset of Pascal for teaching the language and structured programming".

As a computer aimed at the education market, the BBC Micro was supported by several implementations of Logo: Acornsoft Logo competing with Logo products from Logotron, LSL, and the Open University. These products provided either one or two 16 KB ROM chips for fitting inside the machine, although the Open University's Open Logo provided a second processor implementation that was loaded from disc. Acornsoft's Logo was itself written in the BCPL language whereas other implementations had been assembled to machine code. Compatibility with Logo dialects and standards varied, with Logotron Logo claiming a level of adherence to the broader Logo Computer Systems Inc. (LCSI) industry standard, and the level of provided functionality differed between the BBC Micro implementations, with Acornsoft Logo providing the most comprehensive set of primitives in many areas. Support for various peripherals and accessories was advertised, floor turtles having particular significance, but hardware extensions offering sprite capabilities were also developed for use with certain implementations, notably Logotron Logo. Logotron Logo was eventually judged to be the most popular product and was bundled with the Master Compact by Acorn.

=== Peripherals ===
Joystick circuit diagram

In line with its ethos of expandability, Acorn produced its own range of peripherals for the BBC Micro, including:

- Joysticks
- Tape recorder
- Floppy drive interface upgrade
- Floppy drives (single and double)
- Econet networking upgrade
- Econet Bridge
- Winchester disk system
- 6502 Second Processor
- Z80 Second processor (with CP/M and business software suite)
- 32016 Second processor
- ARM Evaluation System
- Teletext adapter
- Prestel adapter
- Speech synthesiser
- Music 500 synthesiser
- BBC Turtle (robot)
- BBC Buggy
- IEEE 488 Interface

Various products from other manufacturers competed directly with Acorn's expansions. For example, companies such as Torch Computers and Cambridge Microprocessor Systems offered second processor solutions for the BBC Micro.

A large number of third-party suppliers also produced an abundance of add-on hardware, some of the most common being:

- RGB monitors
- Printers, plotters
- Modems

== Successor machines ==
Acorn produced its own 32-bit Reduced Instruction Set Computing (RISC) CPU during 1985, the ARM1. Furber composed a reference model of the processor on the BBC Micro with 808 lines of BASIC, and Arm Ltd. retains copies of the code for intellectual property purposes. The first prototype ARM platforms, the ARM Evaluation System and the A500 workstation, functioned as second processors attached to the BBC Micro's Tube interface. Acorn staff developed the A500's operating system in situ through the Tube until, one by one, the on-board I/O ports were enabled and the A500 ran as a stand-alone computer. With an upgraded processor, this was unveiled during 1987 in the form of the initial four models in the Archimedes series, three of which were eventually released, with the lower-specified two models (512 KB and 1 MB) exhibiting the BBC Microcomputer branding and bearing the distinctive red function keys. Although the Archimedes ultimately was not a major success, the ARM family of processors has become the dominant processor architecture in mobile embedded consumer devices, particularly mobile telephones.

Acorn's last BBC-related model, the BBC A3000, was released in 1989. It was essentially a 1 MB Archimedes back in a single case form factor.

== Retro computing scene ==
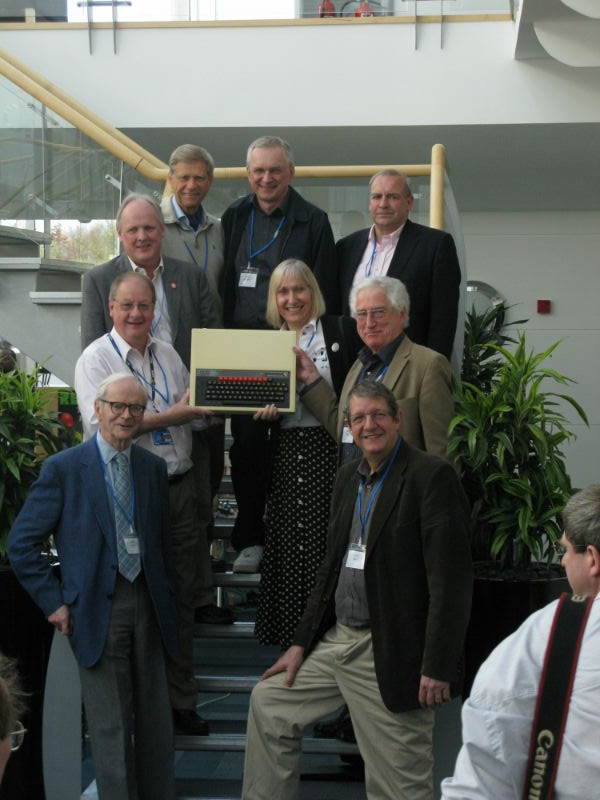
Clockwise from top left: Hermann Hauser, Andy Hopper, Christopher Curry, Sophie Wilson, David Allen, Chris Serle, David Kitson, Chris Turner, and Steve Furber at the BBC Micro 30th anniversary in 2012

Furber said in 2015 that he was amazed that the BBC Micro "established this reputation for being reliable, because lots of it was finger-in-the-air engineering". As of 2018, thanks to its ready expandability and I/O functions, there are still numbers of BBC Micros in use, and a retrocomputing community of dedicated users finding new tasks for the old hardware. They still survive in a few interactive displays in museums across the United Kingdom, and the Jodrell Bank observatory was reported using a BBC Micro to steer its 42 ft radio telescope in 2004. Furber said that although "the [engineering] margins on the Beeb were very, very small", when he asked BBC owners at a retrocomputing meeting what components had failed after 30 years, they said "you have to replace the capacitors in the power supply but everything else still works". The Archimedes came with 65Arthur, an emulator which Byte stated "lets many programs for the BBC Micro run". Other emulators exist for many operating systems, including Beebdroid for Android and JS Beeb for the web.

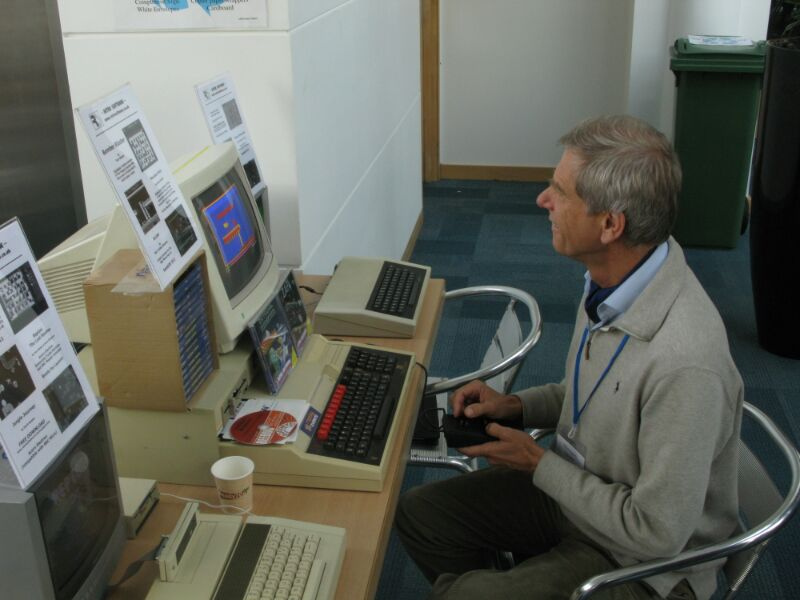
Acorn co-founder Hermann Hauser playing a game on a Master in 2012

In March 2008, the creators of the BBC Micro met at the Science Museum in London. There was to be an exhibition about the computer and its legacy during 2009.

The UK National Museum of Computing at Bletchley Park uses BBC Micros as part of a scheme to educate school children about computer programming.

In March 2012, the BBC and Acorn teams responsible for the BBC Micro and Computer Literacy Project met for a 30th anniversary party, entitled "Beeb@30". This was held at Arm's offices in Cambridge and was co-hosted by the Centre for Computing History.

=== Continued development and support ===
Long after the "venerable old Beeb" was superseded, additional hardware and software has been developed. Such developments have included Sprow's 1999 zip compression utility and a ROM Y2K bugfix for the BBC Master.

There are also a number of websites still supporting both hardware and software development for the BBC Micros and Acorn in general.

== Specifications ==
	Model A	Model B	Model B+64	Model B+128
Processor	MOS Technology 6502A @ 2 MHz		Rockwell Semiconductor 6512A @ 2 MHz	
RAM	16 KB	32 KB	64 KB composed of 32 KB standard memory, 20 KB video (Shadow) memory and 12 KB extended (special Sideways) memory.	128 KB composed of 32 KB standard memory, 20 KB video (Shadow) memory and 76 KB extended (Sideways) memory.
ROM	32 KB of ROM composed of a 16 KB MOS (Machine Operating System) chip, and 16 KB read-only paged space defaulting to the BBC BASIC chip. Four paged 16 KB ROM sockets standard, expandable to 16.		48 KB of ROM composed of 16 KB MOS, 16 KB DFS, and 16 KB read-only paged space defaulting to the BBC BASIC.	
Keyboard	Full-travel keyboard with a top row of ten red-orange function keys ƒ0–ƒ9. These generated text semigraphics when pressed with CTRL or SHIFT, and could be programmed with keyboard macros. The arrow keys and BREAK could also serve as function keys. Links on the keyboard PCB allowed users to select the behaviour of Shift+Break, and Display Mode on Power-up/Break. At least two slightly different keyboards were used during the life of the Model B; both had the same layout, but one had a slightly higher profile on each key.			
Display	As Model B except RGB (optional upgrade, soldering required).	6-pin DIN digital RGB connector +5 V/0 V, 1 V p-p composite colour or monochrome video (link S39) and built-in UHF (PAL) RF modulator.		
Graphics	As Model B, but Modes 0, 1, 2, and 3 not available due to lack of memory.	Configurable graphics in Modes 0–6 (see table below) based on the Motorola 6845 CRT controller or Mode 7, a special Teletext mode, based a Mullard SAA5050 Teletext chip and only taking 1 KB of RAM.		
Sound	Four independent sound channels (one noise and three melodic) using the Texas Instruments SN76489 sound chip. Phoneme-based speech synthesis using the Texas Instruments TMS5220 with a custom Acorn ROM (the "PHROM", a TMS6100) of Kenneth Kendall's voice (optional).			
Tape storage	Tape interface (with a relay operated motor control, controlled via 2 pins on a circular 7-pin DIN connector), using the CUTS [Computer Users' Tape Standard] variation of the Kansas City standard data encoding scheme operating at 1200 or 300 baud.			
Disk storage	Optional floppy disk interface based initially on the Intel 8271 controller and later on the WD1770, also requiring the installation of the Disc Filing System (DFS) ROM (and of soldered connector on Model A). (5 1/4-inch floppy drive usually used) – Densities: Single-Sided, Single Density[SS/SD], Single-Sided, Double-Density[SS/DD], Double-Sided, Single-Density[DS/SD] and Double-Sided, Double-Density[DS/DD].		Floppy-disk controller based on the Western Digital WD1770 controller and DFS ROM as standard (except ANB51, ANB52).	
Hard-disk storage	None	Additional ADFS ROM required, external drive unit connected to the 1 MHz Bus interface. (Winchester Hard disc drives with 5 MB, 10 MB or 20 MB capacities. Maximum of 512 MB per drive, up to four drives).		
Serial interface	Optional upgrade, soldering required.	5-pin 'domino'-DIN RS-423 serial port.		
Parallel interface	Optional upgrade, soldering required.	26-pin IDC Centronics-compatible parallel port.		
User port	Optional upgrade, soldering required.	20-pin IDC "user port" with 8 general purpose digital I/O pins and two special/trigger sensitive digital pins used for control purposes (for e.g. a turtle when using the Logo programming language).		
Analogue interface	Optional upgrade, soldering required.	DA15 socket with four 8/12 bit analogue inputs based on μPD7002 IC (suitable for two joysticks), two inputs suitable for pushbuttons and an input for a light pen.		
1 MHz bus	Optional upgrade, soldering required.	34-pin IDC connector for generic expansion on a "daisy-chain" (used for connecting hard disks, sound synthesisers etc.).		
The Tube	Optional upgrade, soldering required.	40-pin IDC connector for external second CPU. Options included a second 6502, a Zilog Z80, the ARM Evaluation System, or a National Semiconductor 32016 (the latter was either branded "BBC Microcomputer System – 32016 Second Processor" or "Acorn Computer – Cambridge Co-Processor"), other vendors added 6809, 6800, 68000 and 68008. A 10 MHz 80186 co-processor from a BBC Master can be connected through a co-processor adapter to a BBC Micro, thus enjoying a limited degree of PC compatibility.		
Network	Optional (standard on US model), Econet large-scale low-cost networking system @ 100 kbit/s using the Motorola 68B54.			
Secondary power output	Power supply for external disk drives, 6 pins: 0 V, 0 V, +5 V DC @ 1.25 A, +12 V DC @ 1.25 A, NC, 5 V DC @ 75 mA			

=== Display modes ===
Like the IBM PC with the contemporary Color Graphics Adapter, the video output of the BBC Micro could be switched by software between a number of display modes. These varied between 20 and 40-column text suitable for a domestic TV and 80-column text best viewed with a high-quality RGB-connected monitor; the latter mode was often too blurred to view when using a domestic TV via the UHF output. The variety of modes offered applications a flexible compromise between colour depth, resolution and memory economy. In the first models, the OS and applications were left with the RAM left over from the display mode.

Mode 7 was a Teletext mode, extremely economical on memory and an original requirement due to the BBC's own use of broadcast teletext (Ceefax). It also made the computer useful as a Prestel terminal. The teletext characters were generated using an SAA5050 chip, for use with monitors and TV sets without a Teletext receiver. Mode 7 used only 1 KB for video RAM by storing each character as its ASCII code, rather than its bitmap image as was needed for the other modes.

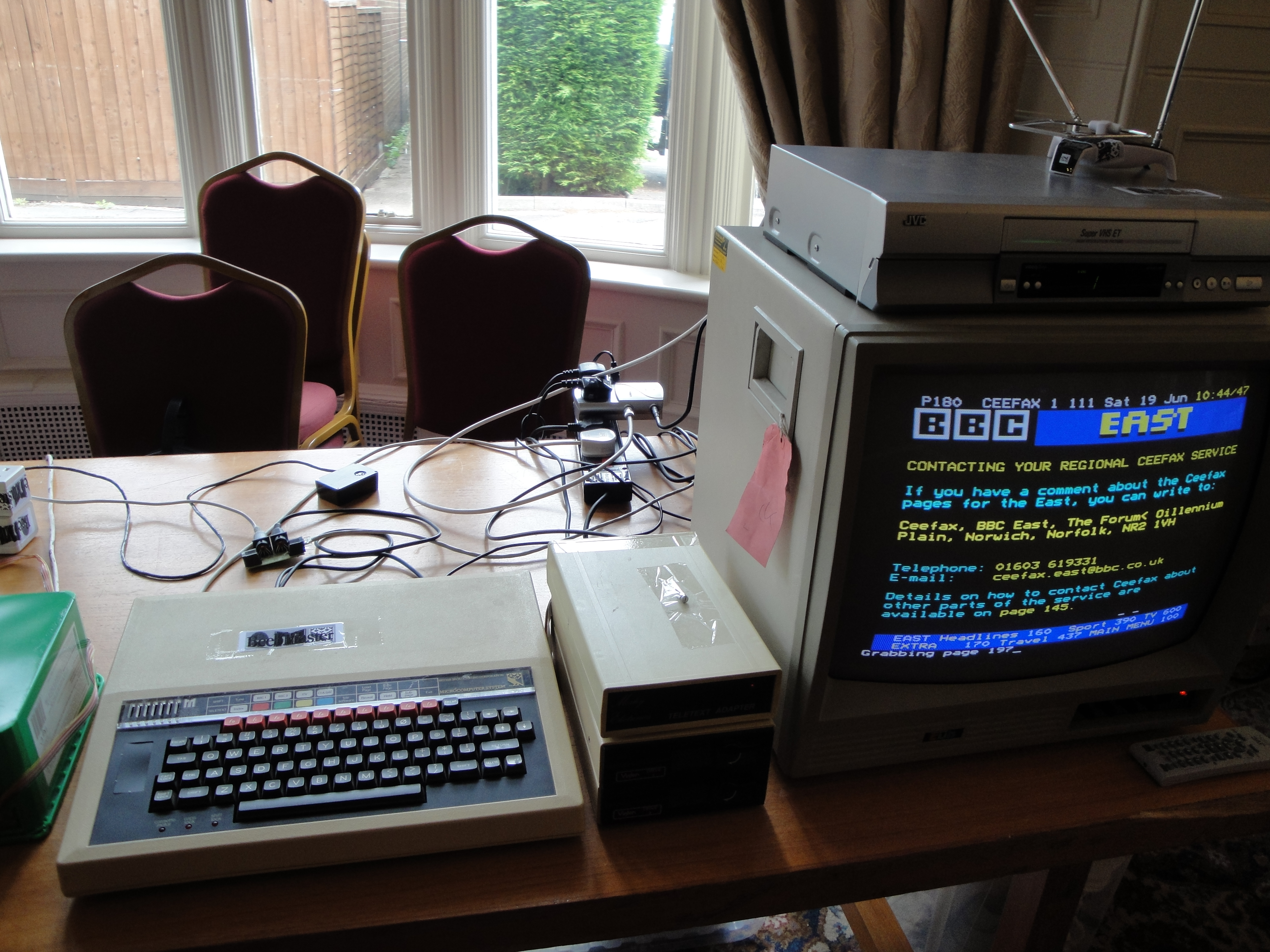
Micro and Ceefax

Modes 0 to 6 could display colours from a logical palette of sixteen: the eight basic colours at the vertices of the RGB colour cube and eight flashing colours made by alternating the basic colour with its inverse. The palette could be freely reprogrammed without touching display memory. Modes 3 and 6 were special text-only modes that used less RAM by reducing the number of text rows and inserting blank scan lines below each row. Mode 6 was the smallest, allocating 8 KB as video memory. Modes 0 to 6 could show diacritics and other user defined characters. All modes except mode 7 supported bitmapped graphics, but graphics commands such as DRAW and PLOT had no effect in the text-only modes.

The BBC B+ and the later Master provided 'shadow modes', where the 1–20 KB frame buffer was stored in an alternative RAM bank, freeing the main memory for user programs. This feature was requested by setting bit 7 of the mode variable, i.e. by requesting modes 128–135.

Graphics mode	Resolution (X×Y)		Hardware colours	Video RAM		Type
Graphics mode	Char cells	Pixels	Hardware colours	used (KB)	map (hexadecimal)	Type
0	80 × 32	640 × 256	2	20	3000-7FFF	Graphics
1	40 × 32	320 × 256	4	20	3000-7FFF	Graphics
2	20 × 32	160 × 256	8	20	3000-7FFF	Graphics
3	80 × 25	640 × 200	2	16	4000-7FFF	Text
4	40 × 32	320 × 256	2	10	5800-7FFF	Graphics
5	20 × 32	160 × 256	4	10	5800-7FFF	Graphics
6	40 × 25	320 × 200	2	8	6000-7FFF	Text
7 (Teletext)	40 × 25	480 × 500	8	1	7C00-7FFF	Text

=== Optional extras ===
A speech synthesis upgrade based on the Texas Instruments TMS5220 featured sampled words spoken by BBC newscaster Kenneth Kendall. This speech system was standard on the US model where it had an American vocabulary. The Computer Concepts Speech ROM also made use of the TMS5220 speech processor but not the speech ROMs, instead driving the speech processor directly. The speech upgrade sold poorly and was largely superseded by Superior Software's software-based synthesiser using the standard sound hardware.

The speech upgrade also added two empty sockets next to the keyboard, intended for 16 KB serial ROM cartridges containing either extra speech phoneme data beyond that held in the speech paged ROM or general software accessed through the ROM Filing System. The original plan was that some games would be released on cartridges, but due to the limited sales of the speech upgrade combined with economic and other viability concerns, little or no software was ever produced for these sockets. The cut-out space next to the keyboard (nicknamed the "ashtray") was more commonly used to install other upgrades, such as a ZIF socket for conventional paged ROMs.

== Use in the entertainment industry ==
The BBC Domesday Project, a pioneering multimedia experiment, was based on a modified version of the BBC Micro's successor, the BBC Master.

Musician Vince Clarke, of the British synth pop bands Depeche Mode, Yazoo, and Erasure, used a BBC Micro (and later a BBC Master) with the UMI music sequencer to compose many hits. In music videos from the 1980s featuring Vince Clarke, a BBC Micro is often present or provides text and graphics such as a clip for Erasure's "Oh l'amour". The musical group Queen used the UMI Music Sequencer on their record A Kind of Magic. The UMI is also mentioned in the CD booklet. Other bands who have used the BBC Micro for making music are A-ha and the reggae band Steel Pulse. Paul Ridout is credited as "UMI programmer" on Cars' bassist/vocalist Benjamin Orr's 1986 solo album, The Lace. Other UMI users included Blancmange, Alan Parsons, and Mutt Lange. Black Uhuru used the Envelope Generator from SYSTEM software (Sheffield) running on a BBC Micro, to create some of the electro-dub sounds on Try It (Anthem album 1983).

The BBC Micro was used extensively to provide graphics and sound effects for many early 1980s BBC TV shows. These included, notably, series 3 and 4 of The Adventure Game; the children's quiz game "First Class" (where the onscreen scoreboard was provided by a BBC Micro nicknamed "Eugene"); and numerous 1980s episodes of Doctor Who including "Mawdryn Undead", "The Five Doctors", and "The Twin Dilemma".

== Legacy ==
In 2013, NESTA released a report into the legacy of The BBC Micro, looking at the history and impact of the machine and The BBC Computer Literacy project. In June 2018, the BBC released its archives of the Computer Literacy Project.

The BBC Micro had a lasting technological impact on the education market by introducing an informal educational standard around the hardware and software technologies employed by the range, particularly the use of BBC BASIC, and by establishing a considerable investment by schools in software for the machine. Consequently, manufacturers of rival systems such as IBM PC compatibles (and almost-compatibles such as the RM Nimbus), the Apple Macintosh, Commodore Amiga, and Acorn as manufacturer of the BBC Micro's successor, the Archimedes, were compelled to provide a degree of compatibility with the large number of machines already deployed in schools.

== See also ==
- Acorn Electron
- Acorn Archimedes
- BBC Computer Literacy Project 2012
- BBC Master
- Raspberry Pi
- RiscPC
- Micro Bit – modern successor to the project
- TV
  - Micro Men – BBC documentary drama
  - Micro Live – BBC television programme
  - Making the Most of the Micro – BBC television programme
- Magazines
  - BEEBUG – user group magazine
  - (BBC) Acorn User
  - The Micro User (also known as Acorn Computing)
- NDR computer
- WDR computer
