= A word =

A word may refer to:

- A (word), the article "a" in the English language
- The A Word, a 3/22/2016 BBC drama television series about autism
- AWord, a RISC OS filetype for the late 1980 wordprocessor Acorn Advance Wordprocessor
- Any of several controversial or offensive words that begin with the letter "a", usually rendered "the A-word"

== See also ==
- A (disambiguation)
- Ascent of the A-Word
