= Julie Battilana =

Social Scientist

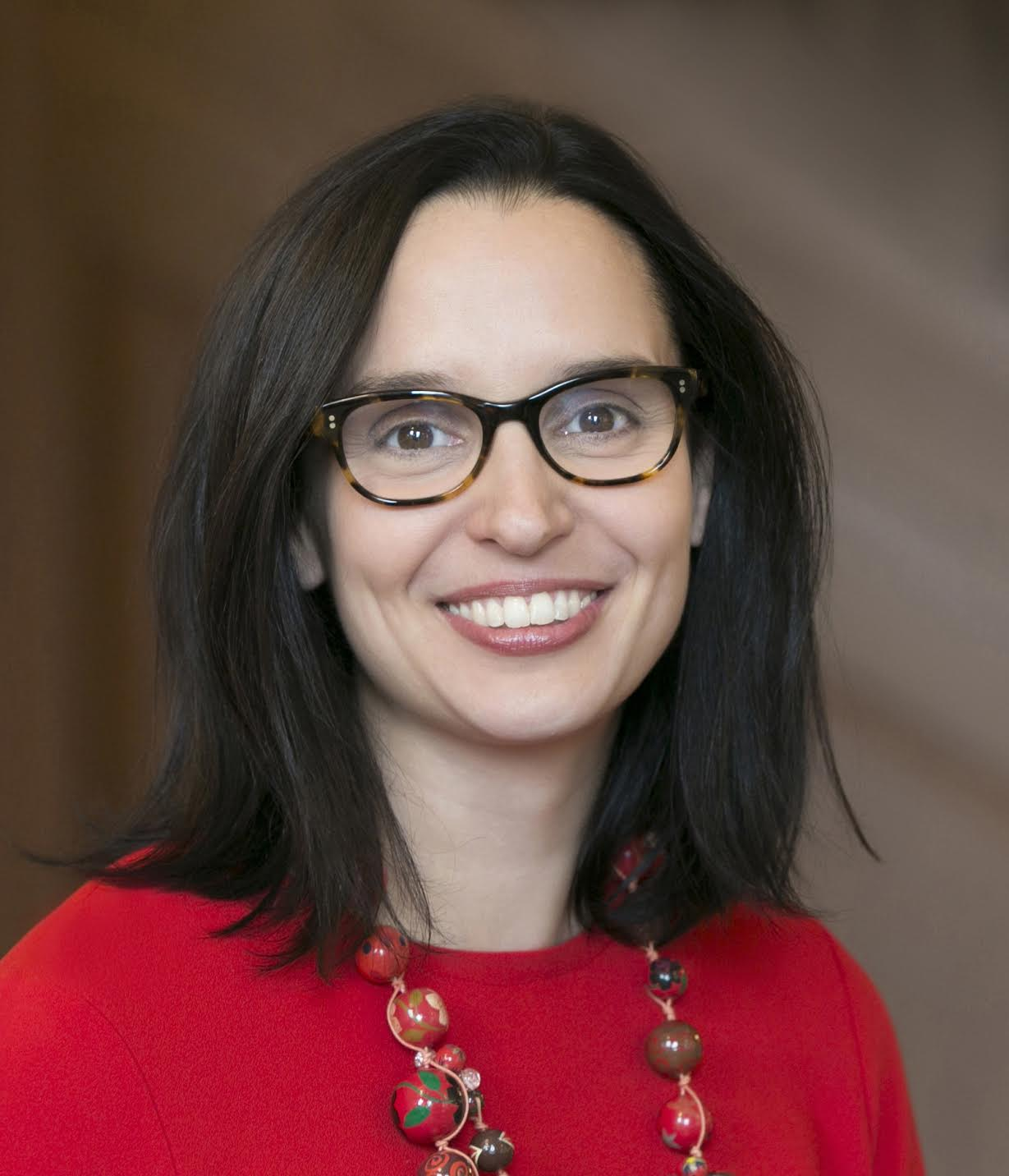
- Photo of Julie Battilana
- Born: May 4, 1977 (age 49)

Academic background
- Education: INSEAD, École normale supérieure Paris-Saclay

Academic work
- Main interests: social innovation, social change, organizational change, hybrid organizing, power

Julie Battilana is a scholar, educator, and advisor in the areas of social innovation and social change at Harvard University. She is the Joseph C. Wilson Professor of Business Administration at Harvard Business School and the Alan L. Gleitsman Professor of Social Innovation at the Harvard Kennedy School.

She is the founder and faculty chair of the Social Innovation and Change Initiative at the Harvard Kennedy School.

== Education ==
Battilana earned a BA in sociology and economics, an MA in political sociology, and an MSc in organizational sociology and public policy from École Normale Supérieure Paris-Saclay in France.

She also holds a degree from HEC School of Management, and a joint PhD in organizational behavior from INSEAD and in management and economics from École Normale Supérieure Paris-Saclay.

Her dissertation was titled “The role of individuals in institutional change: When individuals act as institutional entrepreneurs”

== Research ==
Battilana studies the politics of change in organizations and in society. Her recent body of research focuses on social change and hybrid organizations that pursue a social mission while engaging in commercial activities to sustain their operations. She examines the factors that enable these organizations to achieve high levels of social and environmental performance alongside financial performance.

Her research has been featured in publications like Businessweek, Forbes, Huffington Post, Harvard Business Review, and Stanford Social Innovation Review. She has been a regular contributor to the French newspaper, Le Monde.

== Books ==
Battilana is the coauthor of Power, for All: How it Works and Why it's Everyone's Business, (Simon & Schuster, 2021) written with Tiziana Casciaro. Building on the authors' combined decades of teaching and research, Power, for All offers an analysis of power as a tool for social and organizational change. The authors use case studies and draw on scholarship from across the social sciences and humanities to counter what they call common power “myths,” arguing that by understanding the origins and function of power, anyone can use their power to achieve a common good. Power, for All was awarded the 2022 George R. Terry Book Award by the Academy of Management.

Battilana is also the coauthor of Democratize Work: The Case for Reorganizing the Economy, co-authored with Isabelle Ferreras and Dominique Méda (University of Chicago Press, 2022). The book was originally published in French as Le Manifeste Travail: Démocratiser, Démarchandiser, Dépolluer (Le Seuil, 2020).

== Academic publications ==
Battilana has published many academic articles in the Academy of Management Annals, Academy of Management Journal, Harvard Business Review, Journal of Business Ethics, Leadership Quarterly, Management Science, Organization, Organization Science, Organization Studies, Management, Research in Organizational Behavior, Stanford Social Innovation Review, and Strategic Organization.

== Practitioner materials ==
Battilana has also produced multiple articles for practitioners in outlets such as the Harvard Business Review and the Stanford Social Innovation Review. In "Should you agitate, innovate or orchestrate?" Battilana develops a framework for understanding the roles you can play in a movement for social change. In "The Network Secrets of Great Change Agents" Battilana highlights the key factors of success in implementing change.

In the Dual Purpose Playbook she aims to help managers understand how companies can sustainably pursue both financial and social objectives.

== Democratizing Work Initiative ==
In May 2020, in the midst of the COVID-19 pandemic Battilana, Isabelle Ferreras, and Dominique Méda, published an op-ed calling for reforms to address the global social and economic inequalities magnified by the pandemic. Their call to "democratize" work was published in 43 newspapers of 36 countries, and was signed by more than 3,000 researchers around the world. The op-ed led to the launch of the democratizingwork.org initiative, and the publication of the book Le Manifeste Travail (Le Seuil, 2020), a collection of essays from female scholars around the world edited by Battilana, Ferreras, and Méda.

== Honors and awards ==
Battilana has received multiple mentoring, teaching and academic awards.

In 2024, Battilana was awarded an honorary doctorate from Louvain School of Management at the Université catholique du Louvain.

In 2019, Battilana was the recipient of the Decade Award from the Academy of Management Annals for her article “How Actors Change Institutions: Towards a Theory of Institutional Entrepreneurship”.

She was conferred as a Chevalier of the Ordre des Palmes Académiques in 2019.

Battilana was named as a 2019 social innovation thought leader by the Schwab Foundation for Social Entrepreneurship. This award recognizes experts shaping the evolution of social innovation.

== Teaching ==
Battilana has taught courses about power and social change at Harvard Kennedy School and Harvard Business School since 2010. An online version of her course Power and Influence for Positive Impact was developed in 2022 by Harvard Business School Online.

She previously taught the Leadership and Organizational Behavior course at HBS. In addition, since joining Harvard University, Battilana has published teaching cases about the work of social innovation leaders and organizations. Case subjects include the French civic service organization Unis-Cité and the Brazilian public health nonprofit Instituto Dara, as well as journalists Nicholas Kristof and Sheryl WuDunn, and SASB founder Jean Rogers.
