= Hayagreeva Rao =

Indian-American academic

- Born: 27 April 1959 (age 67)
- Occupation: Academic

Academic background
- Education: Weatherhead School of Management, XLRI - Xavier School of Management

Academic work
- Discipline: Organizational Behavior, Human Resources
- Institutions: Stanford Graduate School of Business
- Website: https://www.gsb.stanford.edu/faculty-research/faculty/hayagreeva-rao

Hayagreeva "Huggy" Rao (born 27 April 1959) is an American academic. He is the Atholl McBean Professor of Organizational Behavior and Human Resources at the Stanford Graduate School of Business.

== Early life ==
Rao was born in India. Rao graduated from the Andhra University in 1978 and earned Post-Graduate Diploma in Personnel Management and Industrial Relations from XLRI, Jamshedpur in 1980. He then earned a PhD in 1989 from Weatherhead School of Management, Case Western Reserve University.

== Career ==
Rao was an assistant professor of Organization & Management at the Emory University's Goizueta Business School from 1989 to 1994, then associate professor from 1995 to 2002 and then tenured professor from 2000 to 2002. He then moved to Kellogg School of Management, Northwestern University where he was the Richard L.Thomas Distinguished Professor of Leadership and Organizational Change from 2002 to 2005. He has been with Stanford University since 2005.

At Stanford, he is also professor of sociology at School of Humanities and Sciences. He studies collective action within organizations and in markets. His research revolves around scaling up mobilization, innovation, and talent in organizations.

== Honors and awards ==
- Wall Street Journal Best Seller List for 2014 for Scaling Up Excellence
- Best Books of 2014 Financial Times, Inc Magazine, Forbes, Washington Post, and Amazon for Scaling Up Excellence
- BP Faculty Fellow in Global Management, 2018-2020
- Fellow, Academy of Management, 2008
- Fellow of Sociological Research Association, American Sociological Association, 2007
- W. Richard Scott Distinguished Award for Scholarly Contributions, American Sociological Association, 2005
- Sidney Levy Award For Teaching, Kellogg School of Management, 2004
- Fellow, Center for Advanced Study in Behavioral Science, 2004

== Editorial Review Boards ==
- American Sociological Review, 2012-2015
- Administrative Science Quarterly, 2003-2011, 1996-2002
- American Journal of Sociology, 1999-2003
- Organization Science, 1997-2002.
- Academy of Management Review, 1998-2002
- Journal of Management Inquiry, 1996-2002
- Strategic Organization, 2001–present
- Organizational Behavior Society, 1997–present
- Organization and Innovation Panel, National Science Foundation, 2000-2002

== Selected bibliography ==
- Rao, Hayagreeva; Sutton, Robert I. (4 February 2014). Scaling Up Excellence: Getting to More Without Settling for Less. Crown
- Rao, Hayagreeva (1 December 2008). Market Rebels: How Activists Make or Break Radical Innovations. Princeton University Press
- Rao, Hayagreeva. "The social construction of reputation: Certification contests, legitimation, and the survival of organizations in the American automobile industry: 1895–1912." Strategic Management Journal 15.S1 (1994): 29-44.
- Bhattacharya, Chitrabhan B., Hayagreeva Rao, and Mary Ann Glynn. "Understanding the bond of identification: An investigation of its correlates among art museum members." Journal of Marketing 59.4 (1995): 46-57.
- Rao, Hayagreeva, Philippe Monin, and Rodolphe Durand. "Institutional change in Toque Ville: Nouvelle cuisine as an identity movement in French gastronomy." American Journal of Sociology 108.4 (2003): 795-843.
- Rao, Hayagreeva, Calvin Morrill, and Mayer N. Zald. "Power plays: How social movements and collective action create new organizational forms." Research in Organizational Behavior 22 (2000): 237-281.
- The Friction Project: How Smart Leaders Make the Right Things Easier and the Wrong Things Harder, with Robert Sutton, 2024, ISBN 978-1250284419
