= A hole =

A hole may refer to:

- A Hole, the 2019 New Zealand black comedy short film
- Asshole, the vulgar insult
