= Strategic Organization =

Strategic Organization' may refer to:

- Strategic Organization (journal), an academic journal
- the study of strategic management from an organizational studies viewpoint (as distinct from an economics viewpoint
- the process of organizing in a way that is strategically effective – i.e., promotes the broad goals of the organization
