= Sanjay Jha =

Sanjay Jha may refer to:

- Sanjay Jha (businessman), an Indian-American businessman
- Sanjay Jha (politician), a politician from Indian National Congress
