= Satish Nambisan =

- Born: 1965 (age 60–61); Kerala, India
- Education: XLRI – Xavier School of Management; Syracuse University
- Occupations: Public speaker, Consultant, Management
- Website: Official Website

Satish Nambisan is the Nancy and Joseph Keithley Professor of Technology Management at the Weatherhead School of Management, Case Western Reserve University.

== Personal life and education ==
Nambisan was born in Kerala, India. He holds a PhD in business administration from the Martin J. Whitman School of Management of Syracuse University; an MBA from XLRI – Xavier School of Management, Jamshedpur.

== Career ==
Nambisan conducts research in the areas of innovation management, technological entrepreneurship, technology strategy, and social innovation. His articles have appeared in several management journals including Harvard Business Review, MIT Sloan Management Review, Stanford Social Innovation Review, Management Science, Organization Science, and Academy of Management Review.

Nambisan is the author of "The Global Brain: Your Roadmap for Innovating Faster and Smarter in a Networked World", which applies the concept of Global brain to management and focuses on global innovation networks. An article based on this book appeared in Harvard Business Review.

Nambisan (along with Mohanbir Sawhney of Northwestern University) coined the term Innovation capitalist to describe a new type of innovation intermediary.

He is also credited with introducing the concept of Virtual customer environment that describes Web-based forums for customer co-innovation and value co-creation. His publications on this topic has appeared in several academic journals such as Academy of Management Review, MIT Sloan Management Review, and Organization Science

Prior to joining CWRU, he was Professor of Entrepreneurship and Technology Management at the Lubar School of Management, University of Wisconsin–Milwaukee and Professor of Technology Management & Strategy at the Lally School of Management, Rensselaer Polytechnic Institute.
