= Assholes: A Theory (film) =

2019 Canadian documentary film

- Directed by: John Walker
- Written by: John Walker; Robert Sandler; Merrily Weisbord
- Based on: Assholes: A Theory by Aaron James
- Produced by: Ann Bernier; Annette Clarke; John Walker
- Starring: John Cleese
- Cinematography: Paul McCurdy
- Edited by: Jeff Warren
- Music by: Sandy Moore
- Production company: John Walker Productions
- Distributed by: Documentary Channel
- Release date: March 24, 2019 (CPH:DOX)
- Running time: 81 minutes
- Country: Canada
- Language: English

Assholes: A Theory is a 2019 Canadian documentary film directed by John Walker Based on Aaron James's 2012 non-fiction book of the same name, the film explores the prevalence of self-centred asshole behaviour in contemporary society. A variety of figures appear in the film, most notably actor John Cleese.

== Release ==
The film premiered in March 2019 at the Copenhagen International Documentary Film Festival, before having its Canadian premiere in April at the Hot Docs Canadian International Documentary Festival. It received a limited commercial run in November 2019, before having its television premiere on the Canadian Broadcasting Corporation's Documentary Channel in 2020.

== Accolades ==
The film received a nomination for the Donald Brittain Award at the 9th Canadian Screen Awards in 2021. It was also a nominee for Best Editing in a Documentary Program or Series (Jeff Warren), and Best Writing in a Documentary Program or Series (Walker, Robert Sandler).

== See also ==
- Stupidity, 2003 Canadian documentary film
