= XLRI – Xavier School of Management =

First business school in India

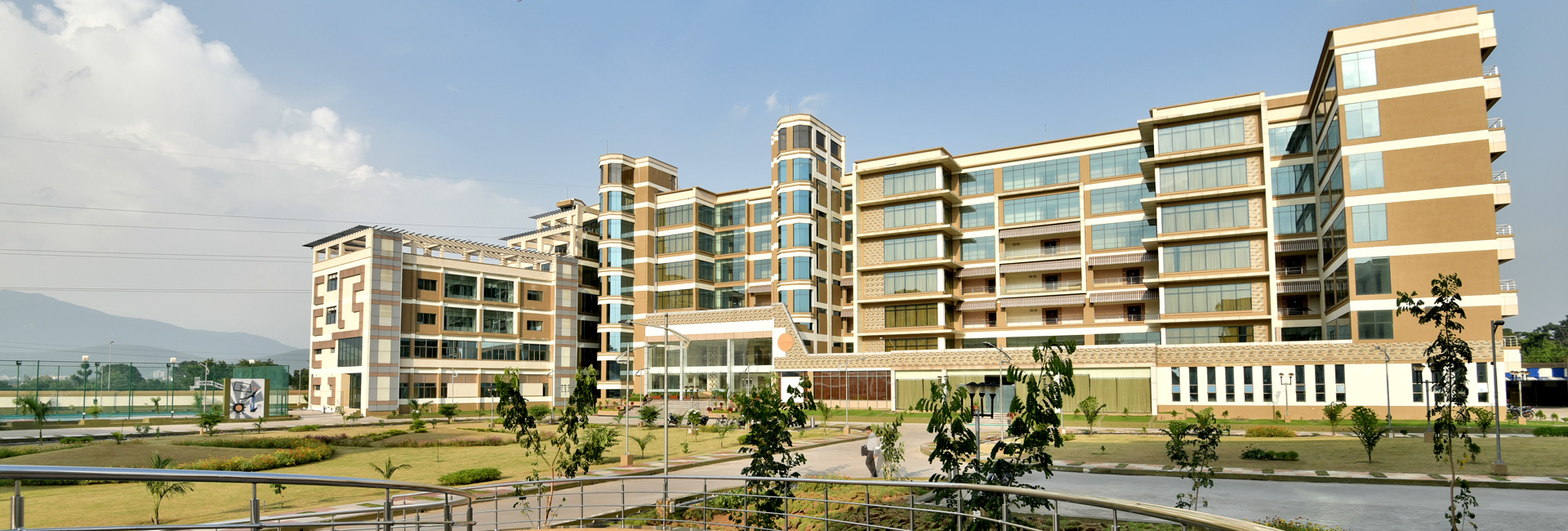
- Former name: Xavier Labour Relations Institute
- Motto in English: Excellence & Integrity
- Type: Private business school
- Established: 1949; 77 years ago
- Founders: Fr. Quinn Enright, SJ (Society of Jesus)
- Religious affiliation: Society of Jesus (Catholic)
- Academic affiliations: AACSB, AMBA, EQUIS
- Chairman: T. V. Narendran
- Dean: Prof Sanjay Patro
- Director: Fr. Sebastian George, SJ
- Faculty: 80
- Students: 1,046
- Postgraduates: 810
- Doctoral students: 236
- Location: Jamshedpur, Jharkhand, India; 22°48′48.32″N 86°11′28.52″E
- Campus: Urban, 40.74 acres (16.49 ha)
- Website: xlri.ac.in

XLRI – Xavier School of Management, formerly Xavier Labour Relations Institute, is a private business school run by the Society of Jesus (Jesuits) in Jamshedpur, Jharkhand, India. Founded in 1949 by Fr. Quinn Enright, SJ, in the steel city of Jamshedpur, it is the oldest business school in India. In 2020, the society opened a second campus at Jhajjar, Haryana, in the Delhi NCR.

XLRI's flagship programmes are its two-year Postgraduate Diploma in Management (PGDM) courses in Business Management and Human Resource Management, the latter tracing its origins to a programme in Industrial Relations and Welfare started in 1953. The institute conducts the Xavier Aptitude Test (XAT), a national-level management entrance examination used by XLRI and other member institutes for admission.

XLRI is internationally accredited by the Association to Advance Collegiate Schools of Business (AACSB), the Association of MBAs (AMBA) and EQUIS, the last of which was awarded by EFMD in June 2026, making it one of the few Indian business schools to hold all three major international accreditations. The institute is a signatory of PRME – Principles for Responsible Management Education, and takes up several social initiatives round the year with a focus on sustainability.

== History ==
Crest of the XLRI – Xavier School of Management.

=== Founding ===
XLRI was established in 1949 by Fr. Quinn Enright, SJ, a Jesuit priest, with the support of Tata Steel officials in Jamshedpur. Sir Jehangir Ghandy, the first Indian general manager of Tata Steel, served as the first Chairman of the institute's Board of Governors. The institute began by offering courses in management and for trade unions, reflecting its early focus on industrial and labour relations in the country's largest steel town.

Fr. Enright served as Director for the institute's first decade and was succeeded by Fr. E. H. McGrath, SJ (1959–62), and Fr. William N. Tome, SJ (1962–70 and 1973–78).

=== Early programmes ===
In 1953, the institute launched a two-year, full-time day programme in Industrial Relations and Welfare, which was later renamed Human Resource Management. The institute held its first annual convocation in 1963, at which V. V. Giri, later the fourth President of India, was the keynote speaker. A three-year evening programme in Business Management was started in 1965, followed in 1966 by a two-year evening programme in Management for junior executives of the Jamshedpur industrial complex; a two-year, full-time programme in Business Management was introduced in 1968.

Tata Steel remained a supporter of the institute through its early decades, leasing additional land as XLRI expanded its faculty quarters, student residences and other infrastructure. In 1972, President V. V. Giri inaugurated the institute's Sir Jehangir Ghandy Library.

=== Later years ===
The institute, originally named Xavier Labour Relations Institute after its early focus on industrial and labour relations, was later rebranded as XLRI – Xavier School of Management to reflect its broader portfolio of management education. In 2020, XLRI opened its second campus at Jhajjar, Haryana, in the Delhi NCR, with an initial intake of 120 students. In June 2026, XLRI received EQUIS accreditation from EFMD Global, completing the "triple crown" of international business-school accreditations alongside AACSB and AMBA.

== Motto ==
The institute's motto is "Excellence and Integrity". XLRI states that it draws inspiration from the Jesuit spirit of Magis – a pursuit of excellence in all endeavours – and lists ethical conduct, integrity and trust, passion for excellence, social conscience, inclusiveness, creativity and a global mindset among its guiding values.

== Campuses ==
=== Jamshedpur ===
The flagship campus is located in the Circuit House Area of Jamshedpur, with the Dalma Hills to its north and the Tata Steel works to its south. Beginning from a smaller plot, Tata Steel leased an additional 36.15 acres of land to the institute over the years, giving XLRI a campus of about 40.74 acres with lawns, gardens and natural forest cover. The campus is fully residential, with hostel blocks — including the Fr. Enright, St. Thomas and Fr. McGrath residences — housing students of the full-time programmes, and facilities for badminton, basketball, cricket, football, tennis and volleyball.

The campus has three air-conditioned auditoriums. The largest, the Tata Auditorium, seats about 1,500 people, hosts the annual convocation and major institute events, and is noted for its acoustics.

==== Sir Jehangir Ghandy Library ====
The institute's library came into existence with its founding in 1949 and was named after Sir Jehangir Ghandy, the first Chairman of the Board of Governors, in February 1972; it was inaugurated that year by President V. V. Giri. Housed in a centrally air-conditioned building adjoining the administrative block, the library holds a collection of over 63,000 books and some 16,000 bound volumes of journals, with a focus on labour relations, management and allied subjects, and provides access to online databases; it is fully automated with an RFID system.

=== Delhi-NCR ===
The second campus, at Jhajjar in the Delhi NCR, began operations in 2020 with an initial batch of 120 students in the Business Management programme.

== Academics ==
=== Programmes ===
XLRI offers two-year, full-time Postgraduate Diploma in Management (PGDM) programmes in Business Management (BM) and Human Resource Management (HRM), its two flagship courses. It also offers an 18-month, full-time residential PGDM (General Management) for experienced executives, a three-year part-time PGDM for working executives, a Fellow Programme in Management (FPM) — a full-time residential doctoral programme — and a programme on Innovation, Entrepreneurship & Venture Creation (IEV). In addition, XLRI runs short-term management development programmes and virtual learning programmes for working professionals.

=== Admission ===
Admission to the flagship PGDM programmes is primarily through the Xavier Aptitude Test (XAT), a national-level entrance examination conducted annually by XLRI on behalf of the Xavier Association of Management Institutes (XAMI); XAT scores are also used by other member and associate institutes for their admissions. Overseas candidates may apply with GMAT scores.

=== Accreditation ===
XLRI received accreditation from the Association of MBAs (AMBA) in 2015 and from AACSB International in 2016; the AACSB accreditation covered both its flagship management programmes and its doctoral programme, making XLRI one of a small group of global business schools with an AACSB-accredited doctoral programme. The AACSB accreditation was subsequently renewed for the period 2021–2026. In June 2026, XLRI was awarded EQUIS accreditation by EFMD Global, which cited the school's connections with practice, the calibre of its students and its emphasis on ethics, responsibility and sustainability. The institute's programmes are also accredited by India's National Board of Accreditation (NBA).

== Rankings ==
Institute rankings

Business – international
| Financial Times (MBA) (2025) | 82 |
| Financial Times (MiM) (2026) | 33 |

Business/Management – India
| NIRF (2025) | 10 |
| Outlook India (2022) | 1 |

Internationally, XLRI was ranked 33rd in the world in the Financial Times Masters in Management Ranking 2026, having been placed 85th in 2023, 65th in 2024 and 58th in 2025; the rise of 25 places was the largest recorded by any Indian business school in that edition. The ranked programme is the two-year Postgraduate Diploma in Business Management (PGDBM), which reported 100 per cent of its graduates employed within three months, an alumni weighted salary of US$183,994, a careers service rank of 11th and an alumni network rank of 14th worldwide. XLRI was separately ranked 82nd in the world in the Financial Times Global MBA Ranking 2025, a gain of 16 places over the previous year. Quacquarelli Symonds placed it in the 251–300 band in its Global Full-time MBA Rankings 2026.

In India, XLRI was ranked 10th among management schools by the National Institutional Ranking Framework (NIRF) in 2025, after being ranked 9th in 2024. It was ranked first in Outlook India's "Top Private MBA Institutes" of 2022.

== Research and publications ==
XLRI publishes Management and Labour Studies, a quarterly peer-reviewed academic journal, in association with SAGE Publications India. The journal provides a platform for research and discussion in the areas of management, labour and related subjects.

== Student life ==
Student activities at XLRI are coordinated through the Student Affairs Council (SAC), under which a range of student-run bodies operate, including the Placement Committee, functional-interest committees in areas such as marketing (MAXI), finance (FINAX) and consulting, social-initiative bodies such as SIGMA-Oikos, and cultural and hobby groups.

=== Ensemble-Valhalla ===
Ensemble-Valhalla is the annual management, cultural and sports festival of XLRI. The institute historically ran two separate flagship festivals — Ensemble, focused on business and management events, and Valhalla, its cultural and sports counterpart — which were merged into a single festival in 2017. The three-day festival features over 60 events across management, cultural and sports categories with participation from business schools across the country, a speakers' conclave called the Idea Summit, and professional shows; past performers include Vishal–Shekhar, Amit Trivedi, Salim–Sulaiman, Divine and Indian Ocean.

Other annual student events include the MAXI Fair, a marketing research fair organised by the institute's marketing association, and a long-running annual sports meet with IIM Calcutta.

== Notable people ==
=== Alumni ===
XLRI, being the oldest B-school in India, has over 30,000 alumni.

==== Academics ====
- Hayagreeva Rao, 1980 – Atholl McBean Professor of Organizational Behavior and Human Resources at the Stanford Graduate School of Business, United States
- Satish Nambisan, 1989 – Nancy and Joseph Keithley Professor of Technology Management at the Weatherhead School of Management, Case Western Reserve University, Cleveland, United States
- Akshay Rao, 1980 – General Mills Chair in Marketing Carlson School of Management, University of Minnesota, United States
- Sarosh Kuruvilla, 1981 – Andrew J. Nathanson Family Professor of Industrial Relations at Cornell University, United States

==== Arts and social work ====
- Akash Khurana, 1977 – actor
- Ananth Vaidyanathan – actor, playback singer and singing trainer
- Mahesh Mahadevan, 1978 – composer
- Mohan Raman, 1978 – actor

==== Business ====
- Arjun Shekhar, 1990 – founder of Vyaktitva
- B Muthuraman, 1966 – former vice-chairman, Tata Steel
- Krishnakumar Natarajan, 1981 – co-founder and former chairman, Mindtree
- Leena Nair, 1992 – Chief executive officer, Chanel
- Naveen Jain, 1982 – founder of Infospace and Moon Express
- Prakash Puram, 1978 – former president and CEO of iXmatch
- Rakesh Kapoor, 1987 – former CEO, Reckitt Benckiser
- Sandeep Bakhshi, 1983 – CEO and MD, ICICI Bank
- Sandeep Kataria – Global CEO, Bata (2020–2025), the first Indian to lead the company
- Sandip Sen, 1989 – former Global CEO of Aegis Ltd
- Srinivas Kandula – former chairman, Capgemini India
- Vineet Nayar 1985 – former CEO, HCL Technologies
- Ramesh Moochikal 1989- CEO, Africa Improved Foods.

==== Government and politics ====
- Abhishek Singh, 2006 – former member of parliament, Lok Sabha for Rajnandgaon
- Arun Maira, 1963 – former member of Planning Commission of India and former chairman of Boston Consulting Group, India
- K. Pandiarajan, 1984 – former Minister for Tamil language, Tamil Culture and Archaeology, Government of Tamil Nadu
- Prerana Issar, 1997 – former Chief People Officer at the National Health Service, UK
- Sanjay Jha, 1986 – former national spokesperson for the Congress
- Vikram Misri, 35th Foreign Secretary of India

==== Literature ====
- Abhijit Bhaduri, 1984 – author, columnist and former Chief Learning Officer, Wipro
- Gautam Sen, 1984 – author, journalist and automotive design consultant
- Shantanu Gupta, 2005 – author and political analyst

==== Sports ====
- Sanjeeva Kumar Singh, 2000 – Indian archery coach, Arjuna Award and Dronacharya Award winner

=== Faculty and staff ===
- T V Rao – Chairman of T V Rao Learning Systems Pvt. Ltd. and referred to as 'Father of HRD' in India
- Kuruvilla Pandikattu, SJ – Chair Professor, JRD Tata Foundation for Business Ethics.

== See also ==
- Xavier Aptitude Test
- Management and Labour Studies
- List of Jesuit educational institutions
- Business schools in India
