= Butthead =

Butthead may refer to:

- Butt-Head, a fictional character from the animated TV series Beavis and Butt-Head
- Asshole
- Idiot

== See also ==
- Category:Pejorative terms for people
