= XAT =

XAT may refer to:

- XLRI Admission Test, an admission test conducted by XLRI in India
- AT&T Aviation Division, United States (ICAO Code)
