= Assholes: A Theory =

2012 book by Aaron James

- Cover to the hardcover edition
- Author: Aaron James
- Language: English
- Subject: philosophy
- Published: 2012 (Doubleday)
- Media type: Print (hardcover) / Digital (Kindle eBook)
- Pages: 221
- ISBN: 978-0-385-53565-6
- Website: onassholes.com

Assholes: A Theory is a non-fiction book written in 2012 by Aaron James, a professor of philosophy at the University of California, Irvine, in which he attempts an academic definition of the term. He is also the author of Fairness in Practice: A Social Contract for a Global Economy.

Assholes: A Theory treats its subject from a philosophical point of view. For example, according to James, an asshole "allows himself to enjoy special advantages in social relations out of an entrenched sense of entitlement that immunizes him against the complaints of other people". Martin Patriquin wrote in Maclean's that the author "spends 214 quite convincing pages arguing that 'assholeness' is less inattention than a permanent state of mind [...]" "Seekers of philosophical meaning will find much to ponder with James", according to Alex Balk in Slate. In addition to defining the term, James provides examples of historic individuals who he says displayed those characteristics. Howard Doughter describes the book as being "divided into two main parts: first, a set of descriptions and definitions and, then, a recommendation about how to manage relations with such offensive individuals".

The book inspired a 2019 documentary film of the same name, by director John Walker.

== See also ==
- The No Asshole Rule
