= Sandip Sen =

Indian business executive (born 1966)

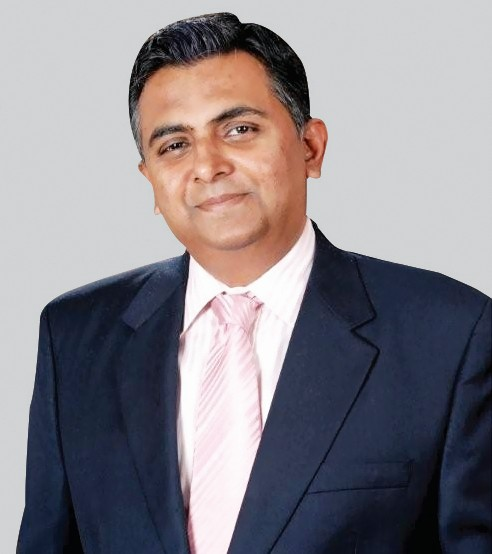
- Born: 4 October 1966 (age 60); Kharagpur, West Bengal, India
- Education: Presidency University (MBA)XLRI, Jamshedpur
- Occupation: Business executive

Sandip Sen (born 4 October 1966) is an Indian business executive. He was the Global Chief Executive Officer & Executive Director of Indian company Aegis Limited. He was appointed as the CEO of Aegis on 1 December 2012 and left the position and moved to the Board in 2018.

== Early life ==
Sandip became an Honors Graduate in Economics from Presidency University Kolkata and obtained a Master of Business Administration from XLRI - Xavier School of Management.

== Career ==
Sandip started his career with the UB Group, and later went on to become the Head of Marketing & Network Head at Hutchison Telecom.

Before joining Aegis in 2001, Sandip founded Customer First Services and supported several blue chip companies. Customer First Services was acquired by Aegis in 2006 and Sandip became the Global Chief Marketing Officer at Aegis. In 2009 he became the President, and later the CEO for the Customer Lifecycle Management Division.

In 2012, Sandip Sen, became the Global Chief Executive Officer and executive director of Aegis Limited. At that point he had over 25 years of experience in the IT & ITES domain.

In six years, Sandip expanded Aegis from a $60 million company to a $1 billion company with over 55,000 employees from 85 nationalities across 13 countries. Under his guidance, Aegis extended their presence to countries like the United States, South Africa, Australia, Philippines, the Middle East, India and the UK.

In 2018, he became the head of LitmusWorld, a loyalty startup.

Sandip is a writer who contributes to national newspapers and industry journals. He has been a part of several key industry summits globally such as the IAOP, NASSCOM India BPM Strategy Summit, the Business World BPO Forum, and The Outsourcing Summit.

== Personal life ==
His father, Sankar Sen, served as an officer of the Indian Police Service following which he was later appointed as Director of the National Police Academy and Director General of the National Human Rights Commission. Sandip's mother is associated with the National Commission for women.

== Recognition ==
- 2013: 9th Indo-American Corporate Excellence Awards 2013 received from CM Shri Chavan
- 2013: Most Talented Leaders (Outsourcing Industry
- 2014: Thought Leaders : HR Awards
- 2016 : Synergy Business Excellence Award at XLRI
