= Isabelle Ferreras =

Sociologist and a political scientist

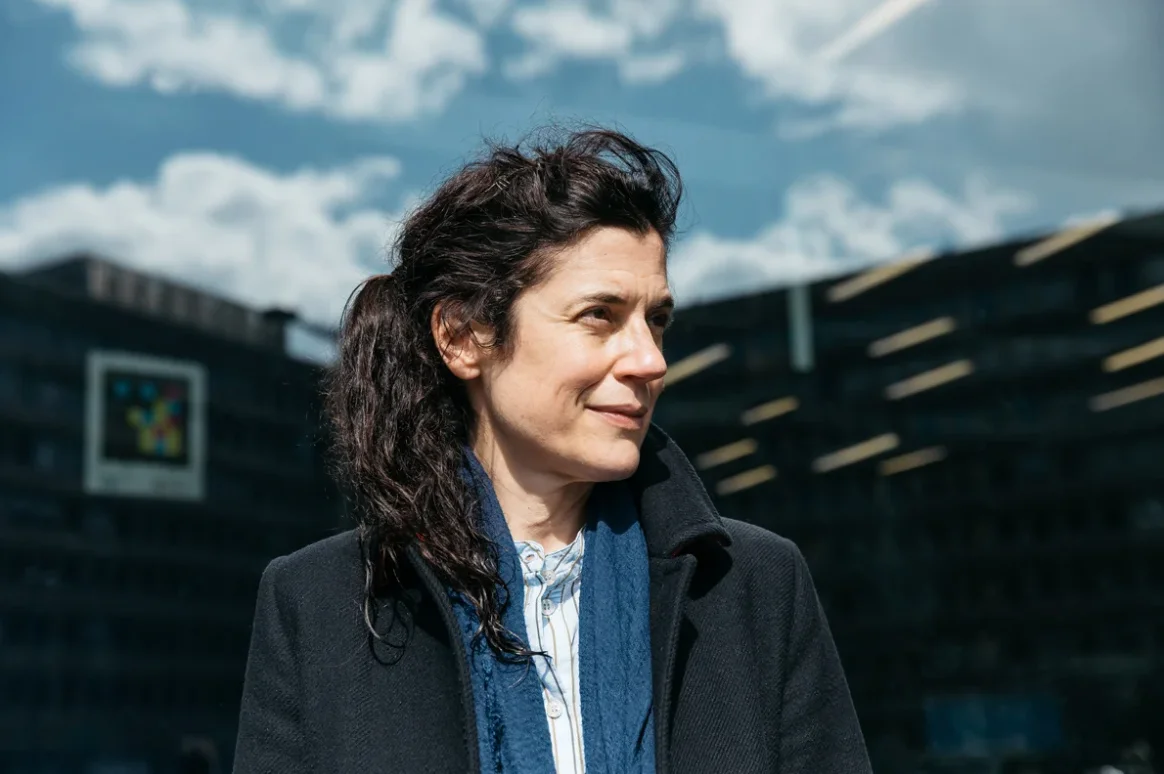
- Born: 21 August 1975 (age 50); Ottignies, Belgium
- Education: PhD, University of Louvain (2004), MSc, Massachusetts Institute of Technology (2004)
- Occupations: Researcher, university professor
- Website: isabelleferreras.net

Isabelle Ferreras (born 21 August 1975) is a Belgian sociologist and a political scientist. She is a professor of sociology at the University of Louvain (Louvain-la-Neuve, Belgium) where she is affiliated with the Centre de recherches interdisciplinaires Démocratie, Institutions, Subjectivité. She is also a senior research associate at the Labor and Work life Program at Harvard Law School. Furthermore, Ferreras is a tenured fellow of the Belgian National Science Foundation (F.N.R.S., Brussels). Since the spring of 2017 she has been a member of the group called Classe Technologie et Société in the Royal Academy of Sciences, Humanities and the Arts of Belgium where she in 2021 and 2022 holds the position as president of the academy as well as the chairman of her group.

Ferreras works in political sociology, sociology of economics, and political theory. She is interested in topics such as worker's experiences, democratic equality in capitalist societies, corporate governance, labor-manager relations, unions, and the labor market. In 2017 Ferreras published a book called "Firms as Political Entities – Saving Democracy through Economic Bicameralism" which received wide attention in the academic field. She is also a co-founder of the #DemocratizingWork movement and a co-author of its manifesto.

== Background and education ==
In 2004 Ferreras obtained a PhD in sociology from the University of Louvain as well as a MSc in political science from Massachusetts Institute of Technology. In 2000, Ferreras was a visiting scholar at University of Wisconsin-Madison. In 2005 she graduated from the Harvard Trade Union Program.

== Work ==
Ferreras' interests lies in the field of tension between the state, businesses, and workers' in a globalised world and especially governance of firms and workplace democracy. She has developed what she has labeled a "critical political sociology of work" and her work centers around what she calls the "capitalism/democracy contradiction".

In 2016, Ferreras and Hélène Landemore published a paper where they argue that businesses can be seen as analogous to states. They claim that firms should be governed democratically due to the organisational similarities. Ferreras and Landemore advocate for the need of further development of a political theory of the firm. Furthermore, Ferreras has conducted several empirical case studies of workers in collaboration with different academic colleagues. Together with Jean De Munck she has examined the voice of workers in restructuring processes in a Volkswagen plant in Brussels. In another qualitative case study Ferras has examined a Freelancers' cooperative called SMart-Belgium as a case of "democratic institutional experimentation for better work" along with Julien Charles and Auriane Lamine.

=== Firms as political entities ===
In her book Firms as Political Entities: Saving Democracy through Economic Bicameralism (2017), Ferreras presents her theory of democratic corporate governance. She claims that firms should be recognised as political entities and that firms are the institution in democratic societies that best embody the tension of between capitalism and democracy. Firms rule the global economy but are governed by capital inverstors. When taking managerial decisions investere do not only determine the future of the company but also the worker's future, and the future of the community in which the company exists. Ferreras proposes to democratise firms to make them fit the context of democratic societies by implementing economic bicameralism in companies. The book consists of three main parts:

==== Part 1 – Critical history of power in the firm: The slow transition of work from the private to the public sphere ====
In this part, Ferreras explains how there has been as historical transformation of work in our culture from being private to public. Work is no longer in the private sphere and affected by feudal and household norms and later the factories. Thus, originally, work was built around the relationship between the worker and physical objects and the machines to produce objects. Today, work is a part of the public, democratic sphere and is especially characterized by service work. Since this form of work is about the relationship between workers and customers work becomes inherently political. Also, industrial firms have introduced a democratic structure of bargaining and decision making between employees and workers.

==== Part 2 – What is a firm? ====
Ferreras argues that firms are more than legal constructs. She claims that firms should also be seen as political entities since they involves work and work relations between the employees which extend beyond being just legal relations. However, firms are still considered private which enables systems of hierarchy and domination to exist in the public. Ferreras argues that the private rule of the capital investors is illegitimate.

Ferreras argues that two types of rationalities exist in a firm. The term "instrumental rationality" labels the set of norms of firms' activities that produce external good such as financial returns for capital investors. Another example of instrumental rationality is when the worker sees her activities as means to getting her pay check. The other form of rationality that characterize a set of norms in a firm is "expressive rationality" in the sense that the worker expresses her essential self. This is when the worker becomes attached to the firm, e.g. forms friendships with other workers and becomes attached to the firms' tradition. It is when the worker is truly engaged in her work and not only sees work as means to an end. Work related to expressive rationality is characterized by a moral, ethical, and political ideals. The two forms of rationality compete with each other and Ferreras' proposed bicameral system can provide a balance between the instrumental and expressive rationality.

==== Part 3 – Looking to the future: From political bicameralism to economic bicameralism ====
Ferreras proposes to organize firms in a bicameral system of corporate governance inspired by bicameral political legislatures. The idea is that this organization of firms should grant the workers of a company the same rights as the capital investors. Both capital investors and the workers are essentially "investors" in a firm, although in different ways, and should therefore have an equal say. The governance of firms should include two operational representative bodies, one for capitalist inventors and one for the workers of the firm. Major decisions of the firm should be passed with a Majority of votes in each body. In this way, the shareholder's councils and worker's councils have to agree and adopt the same strategic texts and decisions. Both bodies have veto power which means that they have to build compromises and the rule of firms can become legitimate.

== Academic inspirations and approach ==
In her academic work Ferreras is influenced and inspired by Jürgen Habermas,Amartya Sen, Jean-Phillippe Robé, Joel Rogers, Joshua Cohen and Erik Olin-Wright.

Ferreras sees herself as a critical scientist and is inspired by Jürgen Habermas' idea of the critical social scientist whose work is moved by the knowledge constitutive interest to emancipate mankind (Knowledge and Human Interest). She wants to help citizens better understand their situation in the specific moment in history they live, to "contribute to their capacity to seek autonomy at a collective and individual level," and affect their own future. Methodologically she works hermeneutically to "identify social actor's critical intuitions about the situations they face".

== The #Democratizingwork movement ==
In May 2020, Isabelle Ferreras, Julie Battilana and Dominique Méda initiated a global initiative for democratising work and workplaces. They call attention to how the COVID-19 pandemic has highlighted what they see as "cracks and vulnerabilities" of our economy and political system. Specifically, the poor working conditions of the workers who kept societies running throughout the COVID-19 crisis involved both mental and physical risks. The authors point out that the workers usually are "members of radicalized communities, migrants and informal economy workers" which they term "essential workers". The authors call for a "democratisation of firms" and that workers should be given a voice and be a part of the governing of a firm and that their wages should be increased. Furthermore, Ferreras, Battilana and Méda argue that the lives of working humans should not only be governed by market forces and capital investors. They call for a "decommodification of work" and claim humans are not just resources or commodities that instrumentally provide a service for an employer. On the contrary, people invest themselves and engage in their jobs, which Ferreras calls "labor investment". The three scholars have summarised their message in a "working manifesto" which is published in the book Le Manifeste Travail – Démocratiser, Démarchandiser, Dépolluer. Shortly after announcing the initiative publicly as a press release in 36 countries, additional five female scholars backed the project to created awareness in the academic community across different disciplines. These are Julia Cagé, Lisa Herzog, Sara Lafuente Hernandez, Hélène Landemore and Pavlina Tcherneva.

The initiative has gotten wide attention both in the global media and among academic scholars. As of May 2021 more than 6,700 individuals have signed the initiative.

== Two Promises to Those Who Work: Voice and Ownership ==
Ferreras presided over the International Committee of High-Level Experts on Democracy at Work established by the Government of Spain in February 2025 in Madrid. Composed of 13 experts from Spain and other countries, the Committee was created to advance the implementation of Article 129.2 of the Spanish Constitution, which mandates the promotion of workers’ participation in firms, the encouragement of cooperative enterprises, and the facilitation of workers’ access to ownership of the means of production.

The Committee's work was presented in a report (in English and Spanish) structured around three missions: assessing the state of democracy at work in Spain within its historical and European context; defining pathways for transitioning enterprises toward workplace democracy through mechanisms of worker voice and ownership; and identifying concrete public policy instrument - including taxation, subsidies, financial tools, and labor legislation - to support such a transition. The report argues that democratizing firms can strengthen democratic quality, reduce economic inequality, and contribute to more equitable and sustainable economic outcomes, while also situating the Spanish experience within a broader European policy debate.

== Books ==
- Isabelle Ferreras, Democratizar la empresa capitalista: Piedra angular de una prosperidad compartida y sostenible, 2024. Chili: Adriadna Ediciones, Trad. and Preface by Sebastián Pérez Sepúlveda, Postface by Pedro Chaves y Sara Lafuente.
- Isabelle Ferreras, Tom Malleson, Joel Rogers, Democratizing the Corporation: The Bicameral Firm and Beyond, 2024. Real Utopia Series, New York City/London: Verso.
- Miranda Richmond Mouillot, David Hackett, Isabelle Ferreras, avec Team Endicott, Hé Patron!: – pour une révolution dans l’entreprise, 2023. Paris : Le Seuil.
- Mathieu De Nanteuil, Philippe Coppens, Isabelle Ferreras, Marc Verdussen, La démocratie à l’épreuve – Entre transitions constitutionnelles et défi écologique, 2023. Paris: Le Bord de l’eau
- Isabelle Ferreras, Julie Battilana, Dominique Méda (ed.), Democratize Work. The Case for Reorganizing the Economy, 2022. Chicago: The University of Chicago Press. (Augmented edition)
  - Translations:
    - Italian: 2022, Il Manifesto del Lavoro: Democratizzare, Demercificare, Disinquinare (Roma: Castelvecchi Editore)
    - Dutch: 2023, Democratiseer Ons Weerk! Pleidooi Voor een Reorganisatie van de Economie (Enschede : Starfish Books)
    - German: 2025, Die Demokratisierung der Arbeit. Ein Plädoyer zur Reorganisation unserer Wirtschaft (Berlin: Transcript)
    - Turkish: Forthcoming (Istanbul: Optimist Kitap publisher)
- Isabelle Ferreras, Julie Battilana, Dominique Méda (ed.), Le Manifeste Travail. Démocratiser, démarchandiser, dépolluer, 2020*.* Paris : Le Seuil.
  - Translations:
    - Portuguese: 2021, O Manifesto do Trabalho: Democratizar, desmercantilizar, remediar (Lumen Juris, Rio de Janeiro, March)
    - Basque: 2021, LANA manifestua: demokratizatu, desmerkantilizatu, deskontaminatu (Mondragon Publ., Mondragon, November)
- Isabelle Ferreras, Firms as Political Entities. Saving Democracy through Economic Bicameralism, November 2017. Cambridge/New York City: Cambridge University Press. Paperback release: April 2018. (Translated to Spanish by Sara Lafuente, under review).
- Isabelle Ferreras, Gouverner le capitalisme ? Pour le bicamérisme économique, 2012. Paris: Presses universitaires de France.
- Jean De Munck, Claude Didry, Isabelle Ferreras, Annette Jobert (eds.), Renewing Democratic Deliberation in Europe. The Challenge of Social and Civil Dialogue, 2012*.* Oxford-Brussels: Peter Lang Press.
- Isabelle Ferreras, Critique politique du travail. Travailler à l’heure de la société des services, 2007. Paris: Presses de Sciences Po.
