= Robert I. Sutton =

American management academic

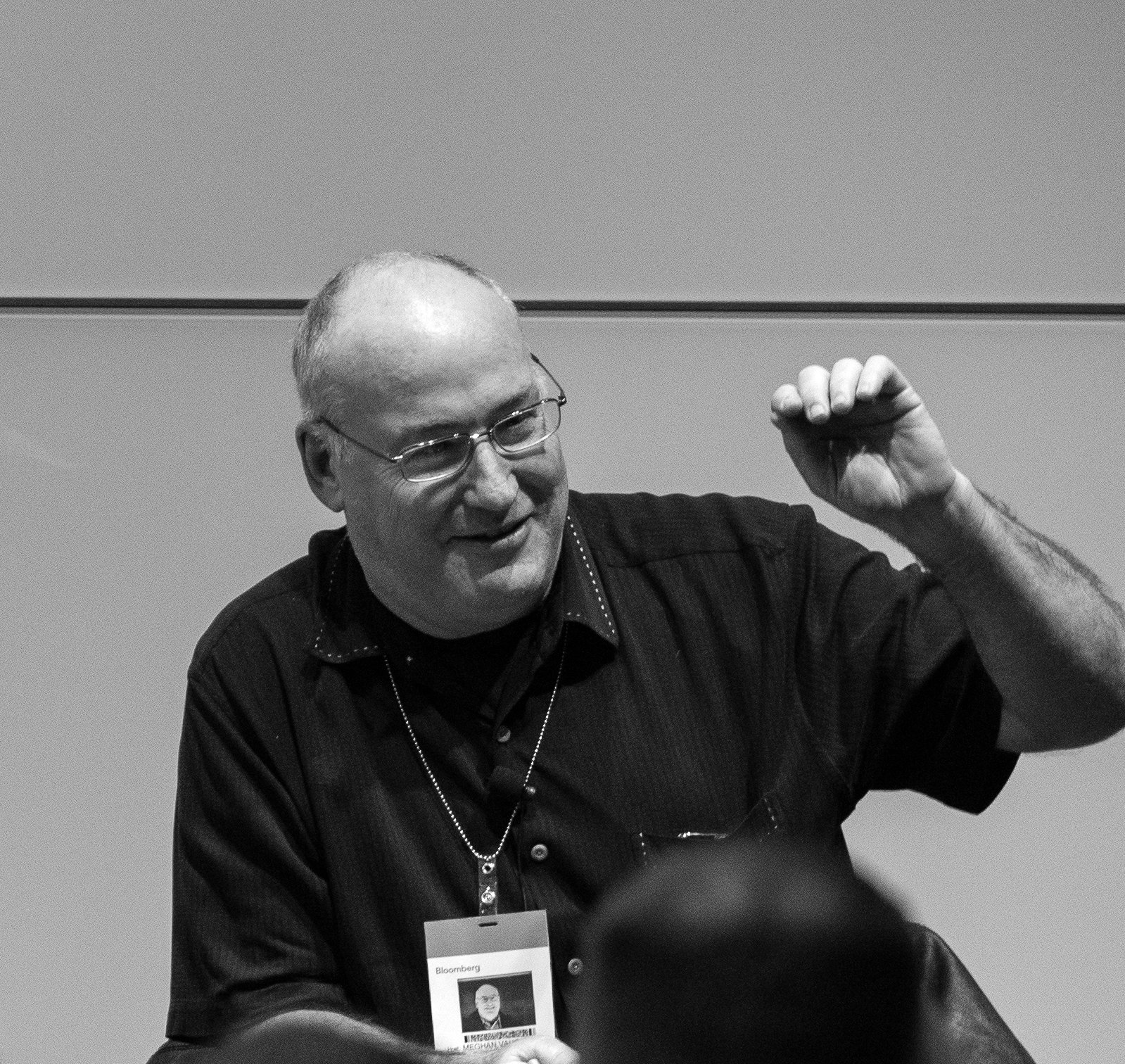
Robert Sutton at a book promotion event in San Francisco, March 2014

Robert I. Sutton (born 1954 in Chicago) is an American professor of management science at the Stanford University School of Engineering and a researcher in the field of evidence-based management. He is a New York Times best-selling author.

Sutton received a Ph.D. in organizational psychology from the University of Michigan in 1984. He has been on the Stanford University faculty since 1983. He has also taught at the Haas School of Business of the University of California, Berkeley, and was a Fellow at the Center for Advanced Study in the Behavioral Sciences at Stanford during the 1986–87, 1994–95, and 2002–03 academic years. He is currently also a Fellow at the design consulting firm IDEO and has a courtesy appointment as a professor of organizational behavior at Stanford Graduate School of Business.

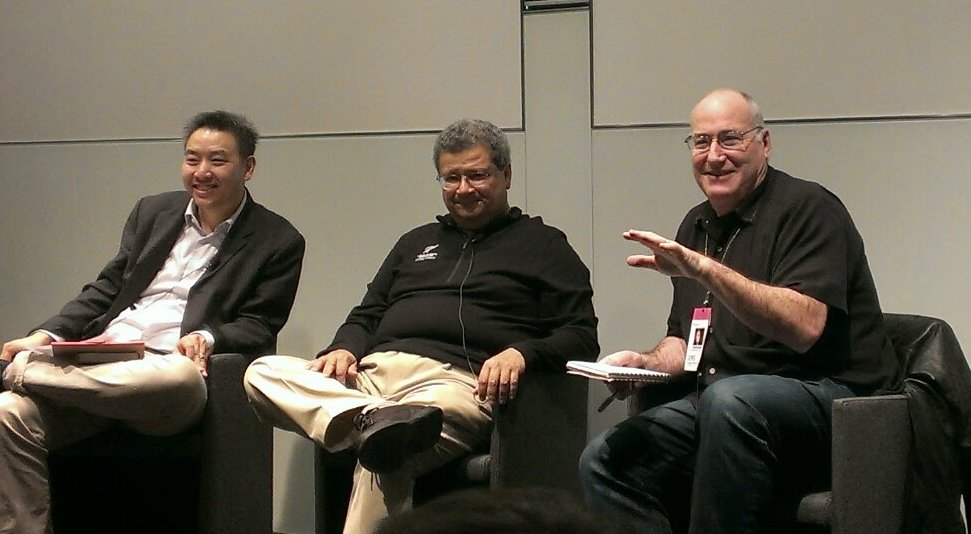
Sutton (right) at a book promotion event in San Francisco, March 2014

== Books published as author ==
- The Knowing-Doing Gap: How Smart Firms Turn Knowledge Into Action, with Jeffrey Pfeffer, Harvard Business School Press, 2000
- Weird Ideas That Work: 11½ Practices for Promoting, Managing, and Sustaining Innovation, The Free Press, 2002
- Hard Facts, Dangerous Half-Truths, and Total Nonsense: Profiting from Evidence-Based Management, with Jeffrey Pfeffer, Harvard Business School Press, 2006
- The No Asshole Rule: Building a Civilized Workplace and Surviving One That Isn't, Warner, 2007
- Good Boss, Bad Boss: How to Be The Best...And Learn From The Worst, Warner, 2010
- Scaling Up Excellence: Getting to More without Settling for Less, with Huggy Rao, Crown Business, 2014
- The Asshole Survival Guide: How to Deal With People Who Treat You Like Dirt, Penguin, 2017
- Sutton, Robert I.; Rao, Hayagreeva (2024). The friction project: how smart leaders make the right things easier and the wrong things harder (First U.S. ed.). New York: St. Martin's Press. ISBN 978-1-250-28441-9.
