= B. Muthuraman =

Indian businessman

- Born: Balasubramanian Muthuraman; 26 September 1944 (age 81); Tamil Nadu, India
- Education: IIT Madras, XLRI Jamshedpur
- Occupation: Vice Chairman of Tata Steel
- Awards: Padma Bhushan

Balasubramanian Muthuraman (born 26 September 1944) is an Indian industrialist, corporate executive, he was the Vice Chairman of Tata Steel, India's largest steel manufacturer and chairman Tata International.

== Early life and career ==
He studied metallurgical engineering at IIT Madras, followed by M.B.A. from XLRI Jamshedpur, and started his career at Tata Steel in 1966. He is also an alumnus of the GMP (General Management Program) at CEDEP, the European Center for Executive Development, where Tata Steel has been a Corporate Member since 1991.

He is also the former chairman of the board of governors of XLRI- Xavier School of Management (XLRI), Jamshedpur and National Institute of Technology, Jamshedpur (N. I. T.).

Mr. B. Muthuraman, was also nominated as the chairman of the board of governors of IIT Kharagpur by the Honourable President of India, Pratibha Patil. He formerly was the chairman of the board of governors of UVCE. He is also currently the chairman of XIME, Chennai.

He retired at the age of 70, as per norms laid out by the Tata Group. He has been awarded the Padma Bhushan by the Indian government in 2012.

B. Muthuraman joined Tata Steel as a trainee in 1966, where he worked for 20 years.
