= Arjun Shekhar =

Indian entrepreneur and writer (born 1965)

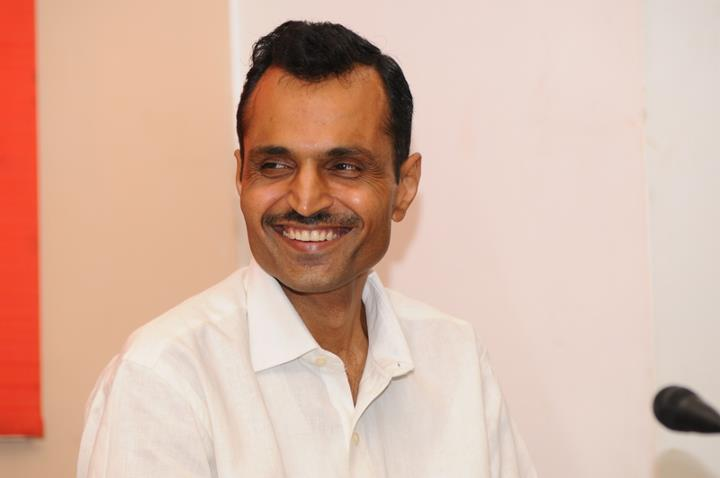
- Arjun Shekhar
- Born: Arjun Shekhar; 20 April 1965 (age 61); Jalore, Rajasthan, India
- Education: XLRI Jamshedpur; Delhi School of Economics; Delhi University
- Occupation: Founder at Vyaktitva
- Spouse: Ashraf Patel
- Children: 1
- Website: Vyaktitva

Arjun Shekhar (born 20 April 1965) is an Indian entrepreneur and writer. An XLRI alumni, he is the founder of the Vyaktitva. He is also the writer of the books, A Flawed God and End of Story?.

== Life and education ==
=== Early life ===
Arjun was born in Jalore, Rajasthan. His mother is from Punjab and his father is from Rajasthan. His father is a retired IPS officer who was the CBI Director during the start of the Bofors case and also the Director of Police in Rajasthan.

=== Education ===
Arjun graduated from XLRI in 1990 after having studied at Delhi School of Economics previously. He captained the XLRI cricket team during that time.

== Professional career ==
After 7 years of corporate citizenship, dissatisfied with following other people's agendas, Arjun decided to begin his own venture. According to him, "Entrepreneurship makes you take complete responsibility for something – you suddenly have a baby and you can't blame anybody else when it cries or pass it on. In this claiming as against blaming, you learn so much – it's the best way to learn about yourself and the world around you – by taking complete responsibility of something and committing fully to it."

He is the founder of Vyaktitva, an organizational development firm that works with companies, NGOs and individuals to bring out the true element of their character. Services include leadership training, people system design, coaching, facilitation of groups, and many other services in the people management domain. Vyaktitva works with clients of varying scales, locations and outreach.

== Writing career ==
=== End of Story? ===
His book, End Of Story?, is a thriller that features questions as chapter headings to run through a plot featuring a fictional unemployed journalist's experience with subliminal advertising.

The book is inspired by Shekhar's business venture's 'Get Real' journeys that focussed on identity as a species instead of individual lives. According to him, "Humans represent what is not present through stories. The ability to interpret a story and create authentic stories ourselves – what I call symbolic literacy – isn't taught unfortunately in schools or colleges. And yet it is the most important meta process that humans need to learn. Through my workshops I realized how inadequately understood this field of symbolic literacy is in spite of us being a symbolic species."

The book has met with mostly positive reviews. Heena Khan from Hindustan Times calls it an "effortless read, reading through which one often does not want the story to end, quite contrary to its title."

=== A Flawed God ===
Shekhar's first book, A Flawed God, was published in 2010. It followed the experiences of a consultant through his choices in his dealings with the corporate world and the stock market.

"A brilliant satire of the boxwallah’s world in which every incident makes you chuckle.." says Jaya Bhattacharji Rose from the Asian Age. The book reached the Sunday Guardian bestseller list of July 2011.

=== The Ocean in a Drop ===
He co-wrote the book The Ocean in a Drop with Ashraf Patel, Meenu Venkateswaran and Kamini Prakash in 2013, exploring "how young people have contributed significantly to society in the past, and suggests ways in which they can take centre stage again."

== Personal life ==
Arjun married Ashraf Patel, who studied with him at XLRI in 1992. She left the corporate sector as well to start up a social enterprise. He likes cricket and trekking, and has trekked to Annapurna and Nanda Devi base camps.
