= The Way We Talk Now =

2001 collection of essays by Geoffrey Nunberg

The Way We Talk Now: Commentaries on Language and Culture from NPR's Fresh Air
- First edition cover
- Author: Geoffrey Nunberg
- Language: English
- Publisher: Houghton Mifflin Company
- Publication date: October 2001
- Publication place: United States
- Media type: Print (Paperback)
- Pages: 243 p. (first edition, paperback)
- ISBN: 0-618-11602-8
- OCLC: 46837151
- Dewey Decimal: 400 21
- LC Class: P107 .N86 2001

The Way We Talk Now: Commentaries on Language and Culture from NPR's Fresh Air is a collection of essays by Geoffrey Nunberg about the effect of language on contemporary culture. Most of the essays are based on segments from the NPR radio program Fresh Air. The title is based on The Way We Live Now. Nunberg looks at modern culture through the lens of language, using his expertise as a linguist to highlight the subtle ways in which language influences society. The essays are organized by subject.

== Sections ==
=== The Passing Scene ===
In this section Nunberg focuses on language as a sign of generational change. Beginning with a personal anecdote of his struggles with his wife to find an appropriate name for their new baby daughter, he goes on to discuss a variety of topics, such as the increasing influence of conversational tics like "you know", the legacy of Yiddish words in American English, the question of personal favorite words, the effect that television shows have on the language, and the use of wordplay in country music.

=== Word Histories ===
Nunberg examines how the meaning of particular words has changed, indicating shifts in societal values. He talks about how slang comes from a different sector of society than it once did, how words with obscure origins mysteriously become obsolete, how the word suburb has signified different social conditions through the ages, how portmanteau words have been on the increase in modern times, and how sarcasm has gradually displaced irony.

=== Politics of the English Language ===
Nunberg discusses how people's choice of words reflects recent political history, examining the difference between force and violence, the use of -i as a suffix for Middle Eastern countries, the phrase political correctness, the Ebonics controversy, and the debate over the word "Jew".

=== The Two R's ===
Nunberg examines the issue of traditional grammar vs. shifting usages, taking a relatively liberal perspective on English as an evolving tongue. He talks about the anachronistic nature of spelling bees; the problems in how parts of speech are traditionally taught; the curious survival of the split infinitive rule; the pros and cons of English speakers' tendency to turn nouns into verbs; and the ambiguous meaning of the word "literacy".

=== Technical Terms ===
Nunberg examines the shifting language of technology, such as words like "virtual" and "hacker", and he discusses other technology language issues such as computer grammar checkers and emoticons.

=== Business Talk ===
Nunberg discusses the language of the business world, including the synonyms for firing, brand names, and the use of the word "issue" as a euphemism for "problem".

=== Valediction ===
The final section contains a whimsical poem reflecting on the issues discussed in the book.
