= Geoffrey Nunberg =

American linguist (1945–2020)

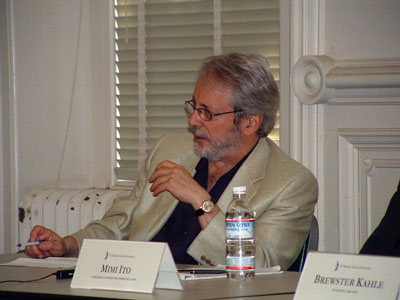
- Nunberg in 2006
- Born: June 1, 1945; New York City, U.S.
- Died: August 11, 2020 (aged 75); San Francisco, California, U.S.
- Education: Columbia College (BA); University of Pennsylvania (MA); City University of New York (PhD)
- Occupations: Linguist, author
- Known for: Work on lexical semantics

Geoffrey Nunberg (June 1, 1945 – August 11, 2020) was an American lexical semantician, linguist, and author. In 2001, he received the Linguistics, Language, and the Public Interest Award from the Linguistic Society of America for his contributions to National Public Radio's Fresh Air.

Nunberg was the author of a number of popular books, among them Going Nucular: Language, Politics and Culture in Controversial Times (2004). He is primarily known for his broadcast work interpreting linguistic science for lay audiences, though his contributions to linguistic theory are also well regarded.

== Life ==
Nunberg was born on June 1, 1945, into a Jewish family in New York City. His mother, Sally (née Sault) Nunberg was a high school teacher, and his father, Jacob Nunberg, was a commercial real estate broker. He grew up in the New York suburbs; as a teenager he was attracted to the growing beatnik scene in nearby Greenwich Village.

Nunberg graduated from Quaker Ridge Junior High School in Scarsdale, New York in 1958, and from Scarsdale High School in 1962. He then enrolled at Columbia University, but left to pursue an art degree at the Art Students League of New York. While in art school, he began writing as a side project, but eventually left art school to re-enroll at Columbia, where he ultimately received his bachelor's degree.

Nunberg received his doctorate from the Graduate Center of the City University of New York in 1977 for his dissertation, The Pragmatics of Reference. Prior to his PhD, Nunberg received a bachelor's degree from Columbia College and a master's degree from the University of Pennsylvania where he studied under William Labov.

Following his education, Nunberg began working as a postdoctoral scholar at the University of California Berkeley and visiting professor at Stanford University. In the mid-1980s he moved to the Xerox Palo Alto Research Center where he worked until 2001. Following Xerox, he returned to research at universities, returning to appointments at Stanford's Center for the Study of Language and Information and at Berkeley's School of Information.

Following a long battle with cancer, Nunberg died August 11, 2020.

== Interests and writing ==
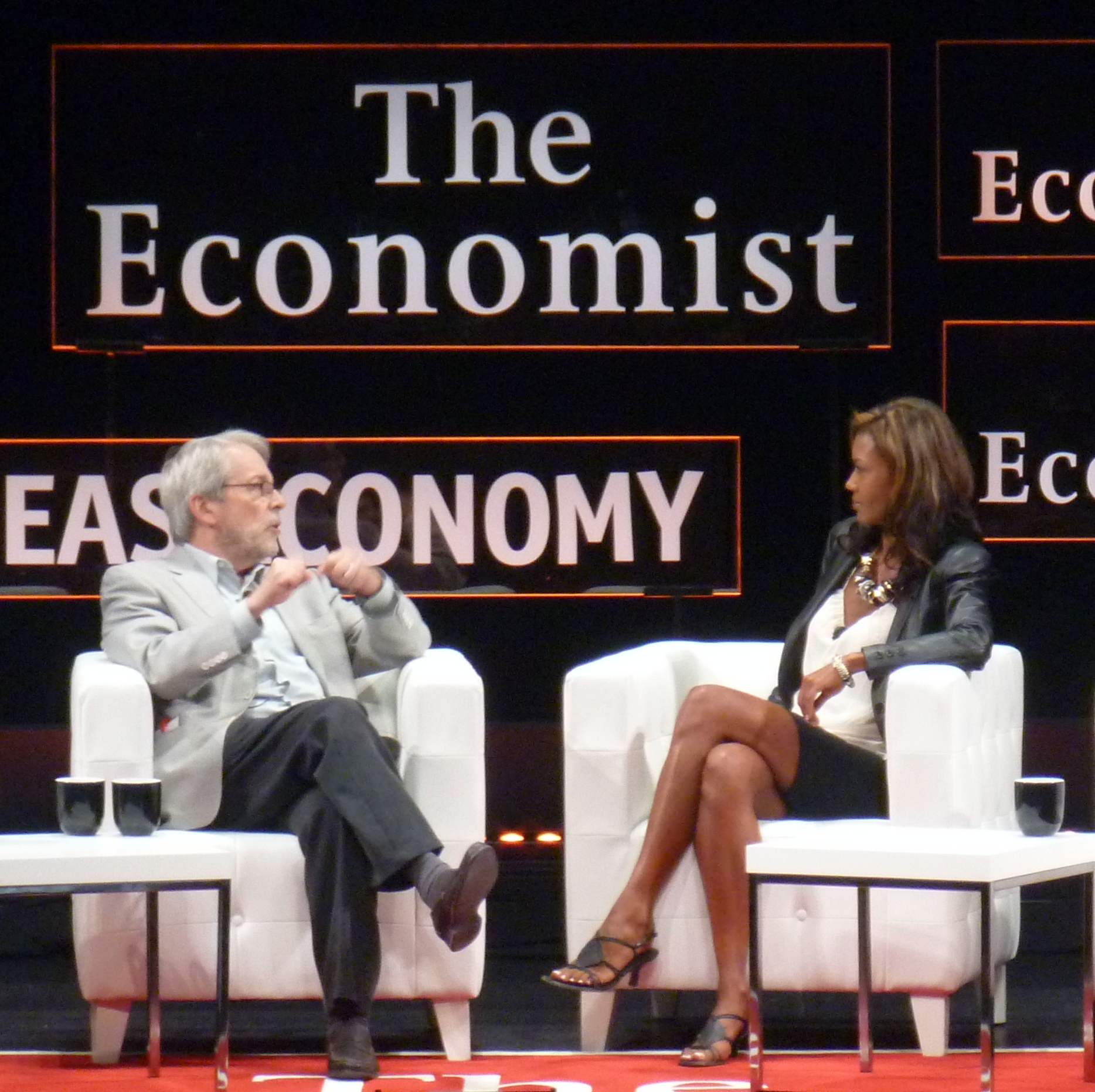
Nunberg talking with Juliette Powell at a conference in 2012

As a linguist, he is best known for his work on lexical semantics, in particular on the phenomena of polysemy, deferred reference and indexicality. He also wrote extensively about the cultural and social implications of new technologies. Nunberg's criticisms of the metadata of Google Books ignited a widespread controversy among librarians and scholars.

Nunberg was a frequent contributor to the collective blog Language Log.

Nunberg commented on language, usage, and society for National Public Radio's Fresh Air program since 1988. His commentaries on language also appeared frequently in The New York Times and other publications. He was the emeritus chair of the American Heritage Dictionary usage panel. His books for general audiences include The Way We Talk Now: Commentaries on Language and Culture from NPR's Fresh Air, Going Nucular: Language, Politics, and Culture in Controversial Times, Talking Right: How Conservatives Turned Liberalism into a Tax-Raising, Latte-Drinking, Sushi-Eating, Volvo-Driving, New York Times-Reading, Body-Piercing, Hollywood-Loving, Left-Wing Freak Show, and The Years of Talking Dangerously (2009).

He was one of the contributors to The Cambridge Grammar of the English Language.

His last book, Ascent of the A-Word: Assholism, the First Sixty Years, was published in August 2012. The critic Malcolm Jones described Nunberg's method in that book as follows: "His means of studying the problem is utterly fresh: take a word, and the attitudes behind it and see where they came from and what they might say about us."
