= Talking Right =

2006 book by Geoffrey Nunberg

- First edition cover
- Author: Geoffrey Nunberg
- Cover artist: Tom Brown
- Language: English
- Publisher: Perseus Books Group
- Publication date: July 2006
- Publication place: United States
- Media type: Print (Hardcover)
- Pages: 264 p. (first edition, hardcover)
- ISBN: 1-58648-386-2
- OCLC: 67346269
- Dewey Decimal: 306.440973 22
- LC Class: PE2809 .N87 2006

Talking Right, subtitled How Conservatives Turned Liberalism into a Tax-Raising, Latte-Drinking, Sushi-Eating, Volvo-Driving, New York Times-Reading, Body-Piercing, Hollywood-Loving, Left-Wing Freak Show, is a 2006 book by Geoffrey Nunberg, who applies his expertise as a linguist to the United States Democratic Party's failure to win elections.

== Summary ==
Earlier commentators have attributed this failure to such matters as weak slogans. Nunberg argues that the problem runs much deeper, in that the entire political discourse in the United States today has been shaped heavily by conservatives. According to Nunberg, ordinary words like values, freedom, patriotism, and indeed liberal itself have acquired connotations that conservatives favor and that even allegedly liberal newspapers like The New York Times and The Washington Post take for granted. Nunberg contends that conservatives have used these terms to paint a picture of elite liberals out of touch with the values of mainstream, middle-class Americans. This stereotype, which Nunberg considers inaccurate, is nonetheless so firmly entrenched in popular consciousness that Republicans need only mention a word like elite to conjure up the image of a stuffy, out-of-touch liberal.

Democratic politicians have tried to reclaim some of these terms, such as when presidential candidate John Kerry styled his 2004 campaign "a celebration of American values." But such efforts are ineffective, Nunberg argues, because they do little to unhinge the powerful quasi-populist narrative that conservatives have developed over several decades. Nunberg calls on Democrats to create an equally powerful (but, in their view, more truthful) narrative of their own through which they can weave together the many issues of advantage to them.

== See also ==
- George Lakoff, author of Don't Think of an Elephant! Know Your Values and Frame the Debate.
- framing (social sciences)
