= The No Asshole Rule =

Book by Robert I. Sutton

- Author: Robert I. Sutton
- Genre: Business
- Publisher: Business Plus
- Publication date: February 22, 2007
- Pages: 224
- ISBN: 978-0-446-52656-2
- OCLC: 154698708
- Dewey Decimal: 650.1/3 22
- LC Class: HD58.7 .S935 2007

The No Asshole Rule: Building a Civilized Workplace and Surviving One That Isn't is a book by Stanford professor Robert I. Sutton. He initially wrote an essay for the Harvard Business Review, published in Breakthrough Ideas for 2004. Following the essay, he received more than one thousand emails and testimonies. Among other reasons disclosed in another article published at the Harvard Business Review, these letters led him to write the book, which sold more than 115,000 copies and won the Quill Award for best business book in 2007.

The theme of the book is that workplace bullying worsens morale and productivity. To screen out the toxic staff, it suggests the "no asshole rule". The author insists upon use of the word asshole since other words such as bully or jerk "do not convey the same degree of awfulness". In terms of using the word in the book's title, he said "There's an emotional reaction to a dirty title. You have a choice between being offensive and being ignored."

== Recognition ==
Two tests are specified for recognition of the asshole:

1. After encountering the person, do people feel oppressed, humiliated, or otherwise worse about themselves?
2. Does the person target people who are less powerful?

Their unpleasant behaviors were catalogued by Sutton as The Dirty Dozen:

1. Insults
2. Personal space violation
3. Unsolicited touching
4. Threats
5. Sarcasm
6. Flames
7. Humiliation
8. Shaming
9. Interruption
10. Backbiting
11. Glaring
12. Snubbing

Sutton believes there is a difference between "temporary" assholes who might be having a bad moment or day and "certified" assholes who are "persistently nasty". He gives the example of when he sent a scornful email to a colleague because he wrongly believed she was trying to take an office away from his group. In this instance, he was acting like a temporary asshole and to be a certified asshole he would have to act like a jerk persistently. Famous bosses who Sutton cites as having weakened their position by bad behavior include Al Dunlap and Michael Eisner. Sutton also identifies Hollywood boss Scott Rudin as an example of a certified asshole. Rudin has fired 250 personal assistants for reasons such as bringing him the wrong muffin. Sutton asserts that Rudin also qualifies as an asshole as his targets are less powerful than him and are left humiliated.

Sutton makes the caveat that while it is essential to screen for assholes, a company should not recruit "spineless wimps". He believes constructive arguments benefit firms and help workers come up with better ideas. Sutton cites that Intel co-founder Andrew Grove believes workers should challenge each other's thoughts. Intel teaches employees "how to fight" and requires new employees to take classes in "constructive confrontation".

== Cost and damage ==
The necessity of the No Asshole Rule and the damage assholes do is discussed by Sutton. He relays Bennett Tepper's research on 712 employees. Many of these workers had bosses who would oppress and belittle them, and Tepper studied the effect these bosses had on them. After six months he found workers with abusive bosses "quit their jobs at accelerated rates, and those still trapped in their jobs suffered from less work and life satisfaction, reduced commitment to employers, and heightened depression, anxiety, and burnout". Sutton relays even minor things such as treating someone as invisible and giving nasty stares can accumulate and adversely affect someone's mental health. Sutton describes how assholes not only affect victims themselves but also the bystanders and witnesses that see and hear about the abuse. Co-workers, family members, and friends are among those who are negatively affected. One British study of more than seven hundred employees in the public sector found "73 percent of the witnesses to bullying incidents experienced increased stress and 44 percent worried about becoming targets themselves". This shows assholes can harm and lessen the productivity of not only their victims but everyone in the workplace. Sutton states the assholes themselves also suffer from their actions in the form of "career setbacks and, at times, humiliation". Even when these jerks do their jobs well they can still be fired. He cites the example of the Indiana Hoosiers coach Bob Knight who despite all his achievements was fired for repeatedly losing his temper.

Sutton discusses the total cost of assholes or the 'TCA' for organizations. While it is impossible to calculate the exact TCA for an organization, Sutton believes it is instructive for companies to estimate how much assholes are costing them. Factors to consider include the number of hours managers and HR professionals devote to 'asshole management' and the costs of lost clients. Future legal costs resulting from lawsuits against assholes and the cost of recruiting and training new employees should also be considered. Researchers Charlotte Rayner and Loraleigh Keashly have used data based on studies in the UK to calculate a company's TCA. They estimate that "25 percent of bullying 'targets' and 20 percent of 'witnesses' leave their jobs, and that the 'average' bullying rate in the U.K. is 15 percent". This means if 25% of victims leave a company of 1,000 people the replacement cost is $20,000 and the annual replacement cost is $750,000. If 20% of victims leave and there is an average of two witnesses for each victim, the replacement cost is $1.2 million, and the total replacement cost is just shy of $2 million. A senior executive from Silicon Valley has previously calculated the cost of an employee Sutton calls Ethan. The expenses relating to Ethan's poor treatment of others totaled around $160,000, and his company deducted some of this money from his bonus.

== Case studies ==
Companies who are listed as having appropriate recruitment policies include Barclays Capital, Google, JetBlue, Men's Wearhouse, and IDEO. IDEO offers jobs to candidates who have interned with the company before and have "demonstrated under real working conditions that they aren’t assholes". They advise candidates they have not previously worked with to have strong recommendations and to have taught in university classrooms. Every candidate at IDEO is also interviewed "by people who will be above, below, and alongside them, status-wise". This method ensures if one high up manager is an asshole that manager will not be able to hire more jerks.

Sutton also stresses companies should mean what they say. While many companies have written versions of the no asshole rule, few entirely abide by them. A group of Sutton's students did a case study on a security company who said they value "respect for the individual, teamwork, and integrity". The study revealed in actuality the company was disrespectful to young analysts and treated them with mistrust. These analysts were top students from prestigious universities and were working at the company for a few years until they returned to school to get their MBAs. As a result of treating these employees poorly, the company had a low rate of return and had a hard time recruiting employees back when they finished school.

Sutton discusses how to enforce the no asshole rule and gives the Men's Wearhouse and a Fortune 500 company as examples of businesses that have done this successfully. The Men's Warehouse fired a selfish and difficult employee even though he was one of the company's most successful salespeople, and as a result, the total sale volume in the store increased. A CEO at a fortune 500 company evaluated employees and fired people on his 'hit list' over a period of two years. The firm benefited from firing these assholes as they have risen from the "middle of the pack" to one of the top firms in the industry. A special chapter is also dedicated to "the virtues of assholes", in which Steve Jobs is discussed as a prime example.

Sutton advises companies to adopt the "one asshole rule". Sutton believes by having a couple of token jerks in a company, coworkers will observe their bad behavior and be more likely to do the right thing. He based his hypothesis on a series of studies on littering done by Robert Cialdini. In one trial of the study researchers spewed garbage and litter around a parking lot, and in a separate trial, they made sure the lot was spotless. They placed a flyer on a driver's windshield and observed what the driver did with that flyer. As part of the experiment half of the drivers encountered a researcher who picked up the flyer on their car and threw it on the ground. Watching this one driver litter affected the subject as "drivers who saw the 'norm violation' were less likely to throw their handbill into a clean parking lot (6 percent vs. 14 percent) but more likely to throw it into a messy lot (54 percent vs. 32 percent)". This study shows when one person is caught breaking a rule others are more likely to follow it whereas if everyone seems to be breaking the rule we are more likely to break it as well. Sutton has applied this theory to companies and believes they should each have a "reverse role model" to remind others of the wrong behavior.

== Frequency ==
The book argues that asshole behavior is rather common by citing various studies:

[A] survey of 800 employees found that 10% witnessed daily incivility on their jobs and 20% were direct targets of incivility at least once a week.... [A]nother study of workplace incivility among 216 Canadian white-collar workers ... found that approximately 25% witnessed incivility of some kind on the job every day and 50% reported being direct targets of incivility at least once a week. A host of other studies show that psychological abuse and bullying are common in other countries, including Austria, Australia, Canada, Germany, Finland, France, Ireland, and South Africa. A representative sample of Australian employees found that 35% reported being verbally abused by at least one coworker and 31% reported being verbally abused by at least one superior.... In the Third European Survey on Working Conditions, which was based on 21,500 face-to-face interviews with employees from countries of the European Union, 9% reported that they were exposed to persistent intimidation and bullying.

The book also affirms that employees perceive "upward" nastiness – for example, directed toward bosses – as the rarest form and occurring in only 1% of the cases, while perceived "downward" nastiness is estimated to account for 50%–80% of occurrences, with 20%–50% occurring among coworkers of roughly the same rank.

== Sequels ==
In 2010, Sutton published a sequel, Good Boss, Bad Boss: How to Be the Best... and Learn from the Worst, which provided guidance on being a good boss. A follow-up book was released in 2017 called The Asshole Survival Guide: How to Deal with People Who Treat You Like Dirt.

== Critical reception ==
Writing in Time, Lisa Takeuchi Cullen questioned benefits from enforcing Sutton's rule. As an example, Steve Jobs' behavior towards colleagues was quite harsh, but how would the company benefit from forcing people like him to work for a competitor? The danger to the company from beta teams (made entirely of nice people and accomplishing nothing substantial) was recognized by Sutter himself in the chapter "The Virtues of Assholes" (his proposed remedy is to keep one truly brilliant bully per office).

== See also ==
- Assholes: A Theory – 2012 book by Aaron James
- Nice guy – Term in popular psychology
- Organizational conflict – Intra-organizational discord
- Toxic workplace – Informal term for a workplace marked by infighting and personal conflict
- Toxic leader – Leader who abuses the leader–follower relationship
- Snakes in Suits: When Psychopaths Go to Work – 2006 book by Paul Babiak and Robert D. Hare
- The Office – International series of mockumentary sitcoms
