= Kerstin Günther =

German business executive (born 1967)

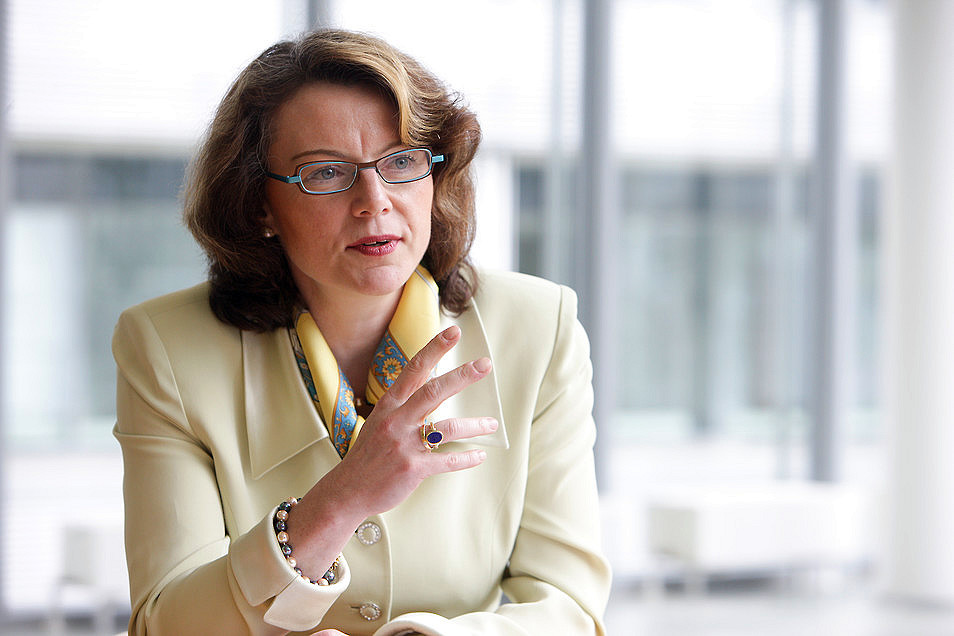
- Born: 1967 (age 58–59)
- Education: Wrocław University of Technology, Weatherhead School of Management
- Occupation: business executive
- Known for: Deutsche Telekom AG, Magyar Telekom, Helmholtz Zentrum München GmbH

Kerstin Günther (born 1967) is a German business executive. Since 1991, she has held management positions in the Deutsche Telekom Group where in March 2012 she was appointed Senior Vice President Technology Europe, reporting to Claudia Nemat, board member Europe and Technology. From 2013 till 2017, she has been chairwoman of Magyar Telekom, which is a subsidiary of Deutsche Telekom. From 2016 to May 2020, Günther was a member of the Supervisory Board and the Audit Committee of the publicly listed, pan-European stock exchange Euronext N.V. Since June 2020 she is a member of the Supervisory Board and the Audit Committee of Deutsche Wohnen SE. Since April 2019, she is Chief Financial and Technology Officer of the health research center Helmholtz Zentrum München. She is responsible for the areas of finance, law, personnel, infrastructure, IT and digitalization.

== Background and education ==
Born and raised in East Germany, Günther studied electronics at the Wrocław University of Technology in Poland, graduating in 1991. She recalls that at the time only about 2% of students were female. She completed her education at the Weatherhead School of Management in Cleveland, Ohio, where she earned an MBA in finance in 1999.

== Career ==
Günther joined what was then the Deutsche Bundespost in 1991, working in telecommunications. After it was privatized as Deutsche Telekom in 1995, she took on management assignments in Hungary (Senior Vice President Wholesale) and Slovakia (Senior Vice President Strategy and External Affairs) where she spent a total of 12 years. In 2003 she returned to Germany and became Co-Managing Director HR of the first Shared Service Center of Deutsche Telekom, the HR shared service center. In 2004 she became the first female Managing Director leading an Infrastructure Branch in Frankfurt/Main, where she managed all technical and operational infrastructure aspects for the company with a staff of some 3,000 engineers. She has also held management positions with the Technical Infrastructure Office of T-Home in Bonn.

Since March 2012, Günther has been Senior Vice President Technology Europe with responsibility for technology and IT in 12 countries and for the Pan European Project. In November 2014 Die Welt article stated that she is "just below the board level responsible for 20,000 employees" in these countries.

In 2019, Günther is Chief Financial and Technology Officer of Helmholtz Zentrum München and promotes the transformation and digitalization of one of Germany's leading health research centers.

Günther has humorously described the European telecommunications industry as being "like the centre of a healthy sandwich under constant pressure from the outside, such as from the market or the dominant IT companies such as Google, Apple or Amazon". When Deutsche Telekom made a digital agreement with the Hungarian government in February 2014, she likened the alliance to being the "sandwich to protect the healthy salad".

In addition to her native German, Günther is fluent in Polish and English and can converse in Russian and Hungarian.
