= Prerana Issar =

British public servant

- Born: India
- Education: Lady Shri Ram College, Delhi; XLRI - Xavier School of Management
- Employer(s): Unilever; United Nations; National Health Service; Sainsbury's

Prerana Issar was most recently the Chief People Officer at Sainsbury’s until she left in September 2025. She was previously a public servant and Chief People Officer at the National Health Service. At the National Health Service, Issar was involved with the People Programme, which looks to better support members of NHS staff. She has previously worked with Unilever and the United Nations.

== Early life and education ==
Issar was born in India. Her parents both worked for the Government of India. Her mother, Promilla Issar, was a senior bureaucrat, and served as Chief Secretary of Haryana. Her first degree was in psychology. She attended both Lady Shri Ram College, Delhi and the XLRI - Xavier School of Management. Issar's first job was working for Unilever in India, where she oversaw projects on global food.

== Career ==
Issar spent fifteen years at Unilever. In 2013 she was appointed Chief Human Resources Officer of the World Food Programme at the United Nations, and eventually became Director of Public-Private partnerships. In this capacity she worked on three major areas, including nutrition, supply chain and technology. Her work was guided by the Sustainable Development Goals. She developed the United Nations' first strategic human capital approach.

In April 2019 Issar joined the National Health Service as its first Chief People Officer. Here she developed the NHS People Plan, designed to support NHS staff. The plan looks to improve workplace culture as well as improving continuing professional development. She delivered a TED talk on the Power of Purpose.

During the COVID-19 pandemic, Issar was involved with the design and delivery of the National Health Service response. She has said that for hospitals to handle the increased workload they would have to have inclusive, distributed leadership. She was moved by the public support for the NHS, in particular the surge in applications to join the health service. In March 2020, Issar announced that the NHS had partnered with Headspace to offer free mental health support for NHS frontline medical staff. She had hoped that this partnership would reduce stress and risk of burnout. In response to the disproportionate impact that coronavirus disease had on black and minority ethnic communities, Issar wrote to all NHS Chief Executives calling them to better resource and empower staff networks. In particular, she said that if employers could not protect their black and minority ethnic staff they should be redeployed elsewhere in the organisation. In early June, as the Government eased lockdown restrictions, Issar called for NHS trusts to raise awareness of coronavirus disease amongst patients and staff, with a particular focus on ancillary workers.

== Personal life ==
Issar has two children.
