= A Hole =

2019 New Zealand black comedy short film

- Promotional poster for A Hole
- Directed by: James Solomon
- Written by: James Solomon
- Produced by: Lissandra Leite
- Starring: Josh McKenzie
- Cinematography: David Garbett
- Edited by: Alex O'Shaughnessy
- Music by: Mike Newport
- Distributed by: Premium Films
- Release date: 2019
- Running time: 12 minutes
- Country: New Zealand
- Language: English

A Hole is a 2019 New Zealand black comedy short film, starring Josh McKenzie.

== Plot ==
Within a warehouse, filled with dried earth, a worker digs a square hole. A series of people visit the hole and require the worker to make a series of changes to the hole, while they all watch.

== Cast ==
- Josh McKenzie as Luke, the worker
- Lisha Ward Knox as Zara
- David Van Horn
- Bryon Coll
- Lucy Wigmore

== Production ==
Production occurred during 2018. Filming took place within a warehouse at Kelly Park Film Studios in Albany, near Auckland. Solomon ran a fund-raising campaign in order to fund the post-production needed to finish the film.

== Release ==
The short film was released in New Zealand in 2019, and internationally in 2020.
