= List of RISC OS filetypes =

This is a sub-article to RISC OS.

RISC OS filetypes use metadata to distinguish file formats. Some common file formats from other systems are mapped to filetypes by the MimeMap module. Such mapping was previously handled by DosMap.

The MimeMap module maps RISC OS filetypes to and from MIME content types, dotted filename extensions and Apple's Uniform Type Identifiers.

Requests for new filetype allocations for all RISC OS versions are handled centrally by RISC OS Open.

== RISC OS filetypes ==
Filetypes were originally classified by Acorn into distinct ranges:

Hexadecimal range		Designation	Use
Start	End	Designation	Use
000	0FF	User	Unallocated
100	3FF	Non-commercial software	Allocated
400	9FF	Commercial software	Allocated
A00	AFF	Acorn	Reserved
B00	DFF	Commercial software	Allocated
E00	FFF	Generic data	Allocated

=== User ===
This range of filetypes was intended for personal use in closed systems, not for general distribution. Nevertheless, many programs using these types were distributed, especially as Public-domain software. Consequently there are many clashes.

000–0FF
Hexadecimal type	Name	Use	Connected party	Mapped equivalent
000	Crunched	Cruncher compressed file	ACE/Arc Angels	
000	MusDump	Vivaldi compressed music file		
000	STracker	Tracker music file		
001	STracker	Amiga ProTracker/NoiseTracker music file	Hugo Fiennes, The Serial Port	.mod
001	Castles	Castles game(?) file		
002	PlayMod	Music file		
002	SampDump	Vivaldi compressed sample		
002	STracker	Tracker tune		
003	ArmSI	Speed indicator results		
004	AOutline	ArcOutline file	Paul Hobbs	
004	AIM	Archimedes Image Manager 256x256 monochrome bitimage	Wild Vision	
005	ScotGame	Saved game file		
006	ScotSave	Saved game image		
006	PathFile	unknown		
006	WildV12	Wild Vision Hawk V12 512x512 monochrome bitimage	Wild Vision	
007	LCrypted	Encrypted file		
008	GolfDemo	Golf game file		
00A	Armony	!Armony music file		
00A	IcnStorm	IconStorm sprite file		
00B	Matrix	Matrix tracker music file		
00B	MegaBord	unknown		
00C	Circuit	PCB layout file		
00F	Pottery	Solids of Rotation 3D mesh	Acorn User magazine	
010	AIMinfo	Archimedes Image Manager file		
010	Mailabel	Label printer file		
011	HelpText	Help text file		
012	AIM Cfg	Archimedes Image Manager configuration file		
016	PlnPg	unknown		
017	PlanF	unknown		
021	compress	Compressed file		
022	PGP	Pretty Good Privacy encrypted file		
03C	WordSq	Word square puzzle definition	Matthew Eglise	
040	Wordsrch	Word search puzzle definition		
041	Resource	unknown		
041	Widget4	256x256 monochrome bitimage		
042	Widget5	512x512 monochrome bitimage		
042	SmpleDTP	Simple DTP document		
044	Spray	Painting program spray brush		
045	FracPars	unknown		
046	ColorMap	Bitimage palette file		
050	3DPlanes	3D mesh		
050	Filer	Filer settings		
061	Z-Code1	Infocom adventure game	Infocom	
062	Z-Code2	Infocom adventure game		
063	Z-Code3	Infocom adventure game		
064	Z-Code4	Infocom adventure game		
064	C64	Commodore C64 executable		
065	Z-Code5	Infocom adventure game		
066	Z-Code6	Infocom adventure game		
067	Z-Code7	Infocom adventure game		
068	Z-Code8	Infocom adventure game		
068	BigMArt	BigMArt15 file		
069	BigMArt2	BigMArt15 file		
070	QuakePAK	Id Quake game archive file		
073	Sticky	unknown		
077	FTPc	FTPc user menu configuration file		
082	TauFile	Tau document	Tim Birks	
083	TauStyle	Tau stylesheet	Tim Birks	
084	PIC16C84	PIC programmer file	Mike Cook	
099	Puzzle	Puzzle game		
0AA	Indexer	Indexer file index		
0AB	PPPTrack	unknown		
0AC	DiscBox	unknown		
0AD	Split	Fragment of larger file	Adam Hamilton	
0B2	SoftList	unknown		
0BA	TaskBAS	BASIC in Taskwindow (replaced by AA5 TskBASIC)		
0BB	BBCRun	BBC application script		
0BB	MegaBord	unknown		
0BC	PCRun	PC application script		
0CC	Card	!Card2 file		
0CC	HellFile	unknown		
0CD	CDTrack	AudioFS2 CD music track		
0CE	CDData	AudioFS2 CD data track		
0D1	AddrList	Address and contact list		
0D7	GameBoy	Nintendo Game Boy emulator game image		
0D8	GBSnap	Nintendo Game Boy emulator snapshot		
0DC	Keystrip	Keyboard layout		
0DE	BackMenu	BackMenu program configuration		
0E3	SSSheet	!SSS spreadsheet	Chris Stretch	
0ED	SprColor	Sprite extended palette file		
0F5	EPSI	Encapsulated PostScript with device independent preview		.epsi
0F8	HelpFile	Help text file		
0F8	MPEG	MPEG video	Paul LeBeau	
0FA	RayMacro	Ray tracer macro		
0FB	RayLib	Ray tracer library		
0FC	Ray3d	Ray tracer scene		
0FD	F-Shapes	unknown		
0FD	Probase	Probase database file		
0FD	Z88Link	Cambridge Computer Z88 Link archive file	John Allen	
0FE	Psion	Psion Organiser II file	John Allen	
0FE	F-Pal	unknown		
0FF	Used	A file that has been used		
0FF	FineArt	FineArt drawing		
0FF	Diss	unknown		
0FF	F-Paper	unknown		
Hexadecimal type	Name	Use	Connected party	Mapped equivalent

=== Non-commercial software ===
100–3FF
Hexadecimal type	Name	Use	Registrant or connected party	Mapped equivalent
100	1stSheet	1st Statistics package		
100	BackDrop	Desktop background setup		
101	CalcSprd	Calc spreadsheet file		
101	Phone	unknown		
102	SpllDict	Spelling dictionary		
102	Perl	Perl programming language script		.pl
103	UniMode	Screen mode definition	Maurice Hendrix	
107	OreDBase	Oregan database file		
108	DataVox	SysBeep sound file		
109	Glazier	unknown		
10A	SySample	Digital Symphony sound sample		
10B	Symphony	Digital Symphony song		
10C	Keyboard	Keyboard layout		
10F	CLIcon	IconCLI file	Olly Bett	
110	RLaB	unknown		
111	MSDOS	PKArc archive file	David Pilling	
111	MatLabSc	MatLab file		
111	RSDOS	unknown		
112	MatLabFn	MatLab function		
112	Stasis	unknown		
113	FastSpr	Sprite file		
113	ProjMan	Project management file		
113	MoleAnim	Modeller molecular animation		
116	DemoMole	Modeller molecular animation demonstration		
118	Angband	Angband saved game file		
11A	Z-Code	Infocom game file	Infocom	
11D	TAP	Z80Em compressed sound sample	Warm Silence Software	.tap
120	ANSIText	Text in ANSI (Windows) encoding		
122	*Genetic*	Genetic algorithm data		
123	Creator	unknown		
123	ALPS	unknown	Alpine Software	
127	MOPAC	RasMol molecule definition	Roger Sayle, Martin Wuerthner	
128	MOL	RasMol molecule definition	Roger Sayle, Martin Wuerthner	
128	Pifile	unknown		
129	*Alchemy*	RasMol molecular coordinates	Roger Sayle, Martin Wuerthner	
12A	*PDB*	RasMol protein databank coordinates	Roger Sayle, Martin Wuerthner	
12B	RasMolSc	RasMol script	Roger Sayle, Martin Wuerthner	
130	AntiGrav	unknown		
138	MapprMap	Mapper_O 2D map	Nicholas Kingsley	
139	3DScene	TopModel 3D scene		
13C	JFPatch	Assembler patch file	Justin Fletcher	
144	Copier144	unknown		
152	PolyData	Polyhedron definition	Fortran Friends	
153	Cabri	Cabriolet dynamic geometry	Mike Borcherds	.sna
154	SR2000	unknown		
156	PsiWord	Psion Series 5/7 document	Psion	
156	Squished	Compressed file		
157	*PsiSheet*	Psion Series 5/7 spreadsheet	Psion	
157	Playlist	unknown		
158	Psion	Psion Series 5/7 general file	Psion	
159	PsiRecrd	Psion Series 5/7 audio	Psion	
15A	PsiOPL	Psion Series 5/7 OPL (Organiser Programming Language) program	Psion	
15B	PsiData	Psion Series 5/7 database	Psion	
15C	*PsiAgnda*	Psion Series 5/7 Agenda appointments diary	Psion	
160	Copier160	unknown		
164	Copier164	unknown		
164	C64-Disc	Commodore C64 archive		.D64
16D	OrgData	Organizer appointment diary & contacts		
172	Copier172	unknown		
180	Copier180	unknown		
180	Mail	TransArc mail file		
188	Flash	Adobe Flash animation	Adobe Inc.	.swf
198	Encoded4	Arc World Encoder output		
199	Encode4	Arc World Encoder input		
1A0	TSAC	unknown		
1AA	CSSC	CSSC file	Raffaele Ferrigno	
1AB	Address	Address book file	Alex Hopkins	
1AC	Project	unknown		
1AD	AMPEG	Audio MPEG stream		.mp2
1AD	Protector	unknown		
1BC	Imagen	HTML image map		
1C0	JSW_Game	Jet Set Willy game		
1C1	JSW_Data	Jet Set Willy scenery file		
1CA	HotKeys	Key accelerator definition		
1CF	Conjugez	unknown		
1DF	Objects	unknown		
1EC	Crypt	Encrypted file	Stephen Early	
1F1	Tiles	unknown		
1FF	TData	Tiger file	Graham Crow	
1FF	OldSong	unknown		
200	CAIFSArc	Archive file		
200	CFCirc	unknown		
200	GraphSrc	unknown		
201	Z80 COM	Z80Tube executable file		
202	Song	Mascom2 song	Thomas Olsson	
204	Typeface	Italicer Typeface file	A.E.Hersee	
222	DateMark	unknown		
300		TimeStep ImProcess		
371		RayShade RGB		
Hexadecimal type	Name	Use	Registrant or connected party	Mapped equivalent

=== Commercial software ===
400–9FF, B00–DFF
Hexadecimal type	Name	Use	Registrant or connected party	Mapped equivalent
601		CCIR 601	Comité consultatif international pour la radio	
690		Translator Clear	John Kortink	
691		Atari ST DEGAS		.pi1, .pi2, .pi3
695	GIF	GIF File		
697		PC Paintbrush	ZSoft Corporation	.pcx
698		RayShade RAW	Steve Koren	.qrt
699		RayShade	Mark Terrence VandeWettering	.pic
69D	Targa	Truevision TGA	Truevision	.tga, .vda
7A0		TimeStep satellite image		
B22	BBC Micro DFS disc image	BeebIt	Michael Foot	.ssd
B27	OvnPro	Ovation Pro document	David Pilling	
BA6	Excel	Microsoft Excel	Microsoft	.xls
BBC	BBC ROM	BBC ROM (ROMFS)	Acornsoft	
BDF	Firewrkz	Fireworkz	Colton Software	.fwk
BE0	Recordz	Fireworkz Database File	Colton Software	
BE1	Resultz	Fireworkz Spreadsheet File	Colton Software	
BE8		PhotoCD	Eastman Kodak	.pcd
C1C	Workz	Fireworkz Word Processor	Colton Software	
C1D	FwrkzTem	Fireworkz Template File	Colton Software	.fwt
C1E	FwrkzTem	Fireworkz Command File	Colton Software	.fwc
C25	AWord	Acorn Advance Wordprocessor	Acornsoft	
C26	ASheet	Acorn Advance Spreadsheet	Acornsoft	
C27	ADBase	Acorn Advance Database	Acornsoft	
C28	AGraph	Acorn Advance Graph	Acornsoft	
C32	RTF	Rich Text Format		.rtf
C4B	CmprDraw	Compressed Draw File	4Mation	
C6A	smArt	smArt File	4Mation	
C6B	NootBook	Noot File	4Mation	
C85	JPEG	JPEG	Joint Photographic Experts Group	.jpg, .jpeg
CAE	HPGLPlot	Hewlett-Packard graphics language	Hewlett-Packard	
CAF	IGES	IGES graphics		
CC3	Poster	Poster File	4Mation	
CDD	Ovation	Ovation DTP File		
CE5	TeX	TeX		
D21	PDCmdFile	PipeDream Command File	Colton Software	.pd
DB0	Lotus 1-2-3	Lotus 1-2-3		.wk1
DB1	DBaseIndex	dBase index		
DB2	DBaseII	dBase II		
DB3	DBaseIII	dBase III		
DB4	SuperCalc	SuperCalc III		
DDC	Archive	Zip (SparkFS/ArcFS)	David Pilling/Mark Smith	.zip
DDE	PDream	PipeDream	Colton Software	.pd
DE2		ProArtisan	Clares Micro Supplies	
DEA	DXF	Drawing Exchange Format		.dxf
DFA		Watford digitiser	Watford Electronics	
DFE	CSV	Comma-separated values		.csv
Hexadecimal type	Name	Use	Registrant or connected party	Mapped equivalent

=== Acorn reserved ===
A00–AFF
Hexadecimal type	Name	Use	Mapped equivalent
AAE	OrUpgrd	Oregano upgrade	
AB7	PPD	PostScript Printer Description	.ppd
AB9	Monitor	Cerilica Monitor gamma correction curves	
ABB	PlugIn	Cerilica Vantage plug-in	
ACA	LaTeX	LaTeX document source	
ACC	ISO-9660	CD-Blaze CD image	.iso
ADB	New Font	Outline font	
ADF	PDF	Portable Document Format	.pdf
AE3	Director	Macromedia Director animation	
AE4	Java	Java executable	
AE6	MSWord	Microsoft Word Document	.doc
AE7	Replay	Acorn Replay video	
AE8		Generic Saved Game	
AE9	Alarm	Alarm settings	
AF0	ARCWriter	ArcWriter document	
AF1	Music	Maestro musical score	
AF2	PostTray	Acorn Mailman Intray	
AF3	PostBox	Acorn Mailman mail received	
AF4	PostFile	Acorn Mailman filed mail	
AF5	PostData	Acorn Mailman setup	
AF6	SimTrace	Acorn ASim trace file	
AF7	HelpInfo	Help	
AF8	1stWord+	First Word Plus	
AF9	DtpDoc	Acorn DTP document	
AFA	DtpStyle	Acorn DTP style sheet	
AFC	GCODE	Acorn GCODE intermediate file	
AFD	GCAL	Acorn GCAL source file	
AFE	Mouse	Mouse event record	
AFF	DrawFile	Draw vector drawing	.drw
Hexadecimal type	Name	Use	Mapped equivalent

=== Generic data ===
E00–FFF
Hexadecimal type	Name	Use	Connected party	Mapped equivalent
E13	Drummer	The Drummer drum pattern		
E92	DiscIndx	Disc index		
ECB	PCBFile	PCB track layout file		
ECD	TeleSoft	unknown		
ECF	ECFData	Clares Pro-Artisan extended colour fill		
ED0	RawSound	DSEdit audio		
ED1	EdSProg	EdScheme file	Lambda Publications	
EEA	TinyLogo	Tiny Logo program		
EEB	TinyDraw	Tiny Logo drawing		
F09	WiniUtil	BBC Micro Winchester Utility	Acorn	
F0E	BasicIV	BBC Master 128 BASIC		
F1B	65Host	Acorn BBC Micro Emulator file	Acorn	
F7C	Teletext	Teletext screen data		
F89	GZip	GNU Zip archive		.gz
F95	Code	Acorn ARM code	Acorn	
F9D	DiscCD	Acorn Access shared CD	Acorn	
F9E	DiscDP	Acorn Access shared protected disc	Acorn	
F9F	DiscD	Acorn Access shared disc	Acorn	
FA2	HomeWrks	Document		
FA8	EasyData	Database		
FAA	UtlLabel	Labelling file		
FAF	HTML	HyperText Markup Language document		.htm
FB0	Allocate	Acorn resource allocation file	Acorn RISC OS Open Ltd	
FB1	Wave	RIFF format audio		.wav
FB2	MovieFS	Microsoft Windows Video/Apple QuickTime video	Warm Silence Software	.mov .avi .fli
FB4	DiscR	Acorn Access shared resources directory	Acorn	
FB5	NoDisc	Acorn Access missing shared disc	Acorn	
FBC	PBAbacus	Acorn PocketBook/Psion Series III spreadsheet	Acorn, Psion	
FBD	PBWrite	Acorn PocketBook/Psion Series III word processor document	Acorn, Psion	
FBE	PBCards	Acorn PocketBook/Psion Series III database	Acorn, Psion	
FC0	Link	LinkFS symbolic link		
FC2	AIFF	Audio IFF		.aif
FC3	Patch	Acorn application patch file	Acorn	
FC6	PrntDefn	Acorn !Printers printer definition file	Acorn	
FC8	DOSDisc	DOS MultiFS disc image		
FC9	SunRastr	Sun raster	Sun Microsystems	.ras
FCA	Squash	Single compressed file	Acorn	
FCC	Device	Device object within DeviceFS	Acorn	
FCD	HardDisc	FileCore hard disc image	Acorn	
FCE	Floppy	FileCore floppy disc image	Acorn	
FCF	Cache	Acorn FontManager font cache file	Acorn	
FD0	PCEmConf	PC Emulator configuration	Acorn	
FD1	BASICTxt	BASIC stored as text	Acorn	
FD2	ScrDiff	Acorn file	Acorn	
FD3	DebImage	Acorn DDE debuggable image	Acorn, Codemist	
FD4	MIDI	MIDI	MIDI Manufacturers Association	.mid, .smf
FD5	Pict	PICT	Apple Inc.	.pict, .pct, .pic
FD6	TaskExec	Exec (scripting language) file within taskwindow	Acorn	
FD7	TaskObey	Obey file within taskwindow	Acorn	
FD8	MSDOScom	PC Emulator DOS command file	Digital Research	.com
FD9	MSDOSexe	PC Emulator DOS executable file	Digital Research	.exe
FDA	MSDOSbat	PC Emulator DOS batch file	Digital Research	.bat
FDB	TextCRLF	Text using CR and LF for line ends		.txt
FDC	SoftLink	TCP/IP suite: unresolvable UNIX soft link		
FDD	MasterUtl	BBC Master utility	Acorn	
FDE	VTSetup	TCP/IP suite: VT220 setup	Digital Equipment Corporation	
FDF	VTScript	TCP/IP suite: VT220 script	Digital Equipment Corporation	
FE0	Accessry	Acorn Arthur desktop accessory	Acorn	
FE1	Make	Acorn Makefile	Acorn	
FE2	Amiga	Commodore Amiga file	Commodore International, Arxe Systems	
FE3	Atari	Atari file	Atari, Arxe Systems	
FE4	DOS	DOS file	Digital Research, Microsoft, Arxe Systems	
FE5	EPROM	BBC Micro sideways ROM image	Acorn	
FE6	UNIX Ex	Unix executable	AT&T Corporation	
FE7	ViewSht	Acorn ViewSheet spreadsheet	Acornsoft	
FE8	ViewPS	Acorn ViewPS "View Professional" word processor	Acornsoft	
FE9	ViewWord	Acorn View word processor	Acornsoft	
FEA	Desktop	Desktop command file	Acorn	
FEB	Obey	Obey command file	Acorn	
FEC	Template	Window template file	Acorn	
FED	Palette	Palette data	Acorn	
FF0	TIFF	Tagged Image File Format	Aldus Corporation	.tiff, .tif
FF1	RawData	Raw unprocessed data (e.g. terminal streams)	Acorn	
FF2	Config	Configuration (CMOS RAM)	Acorn	
FF3	LaserJet	HP LaserJet data file	Hewlett-Packard	
FF4	Printout	Dot matrix printer data file (various formats)	Acorn	
FF5	PoScript	Adobe PostScript file	Adobe Systems	.ps
FF6	Font	Acorn format outline or bitmap font	Acorn	
FF7	BBC font	BBC font file (sequence of VDU operations)	Acorn	
FF8	Absolute, also Acorn Image Format	Absolute application loaded at &8000	Acorn	
FF9	Sprite	Sprite or saved screen	Acorn	
FFA	Module	Relocatable module	Acorn	
FFB	BASIC	Tokenised BASIC program	Acorn	.bas
FFC	Utility	Position independent code	Acorn	
FFD	Data	Data	Acorn	.dat
FFE	Command	Command (Exec) file	Acorn	
FFF	Text	Plain ASCII text with LF newlines		.txt
Hexadecimal type	Name	Use	Connected party	Mapped equivalent
