= Weatherhead School of Management =

Business school of Case Western Reserve University

Coordinates: 41.51006°N 81.60773°W

- Type: Private business school
- Established: 1952
- Affiliations: Case Western Reserve University
- Dean: Andrew Medvedev
- Location: Cleveland, Ohio, USA
- Website: https://weatherhead.case.edu/

The Weatherhead School of Management is a private business school of Case Western Reserve University located in Cleveland, Ohio. Weatherhead offers programs concentrated in sustainability, design innovation, healthcare, organizational behavior, global entrepreneurship, and executive education. The school is named for benefactor and Weatherchem owner Albert J. Weatherhead III, and its principal facility is the Peter B. Lewis Building.

== History ==
In 1952, Western Reserve University established the School of Business by combining the Cleveland College Division of Business Administration and the Graduate School Division of Business Administration. From its founding until 1988, the activities of the School of Business were divided among the number of buildings in downtown Cleveland and in University Circle. In 1967, the merger of Case Institute of Technology and Western Reserve University created Case Western Reserve University, and the Western Reserve University School of Business absorbed Case’s Division of Organizational Sciences to become the School of Management in 1970. In 1976, the school launched its first full-time MBA.

In 1980, the School of Management was renamed in honor of Albert J. Weatherhead, III, a Cleveland businessman and industrialist, following his $3 million gift to the school. In 1988, space on the Case Quad within what is now known as Nord Hall, then Enterprise Hall, was specially converted to house the growing Business Management program. This was made possible by funding from five leading Cleveland companies: Ohio Mattress, Nesco, Premier Industries, Parker Hannifin, and Keithley Industries.

In 2002, the new Peter B. Lewis Building was completed to house the management school. It was designed by internationally known architect Frank Gehry. The School of Management has about 1600 students annually.

== Campus ==
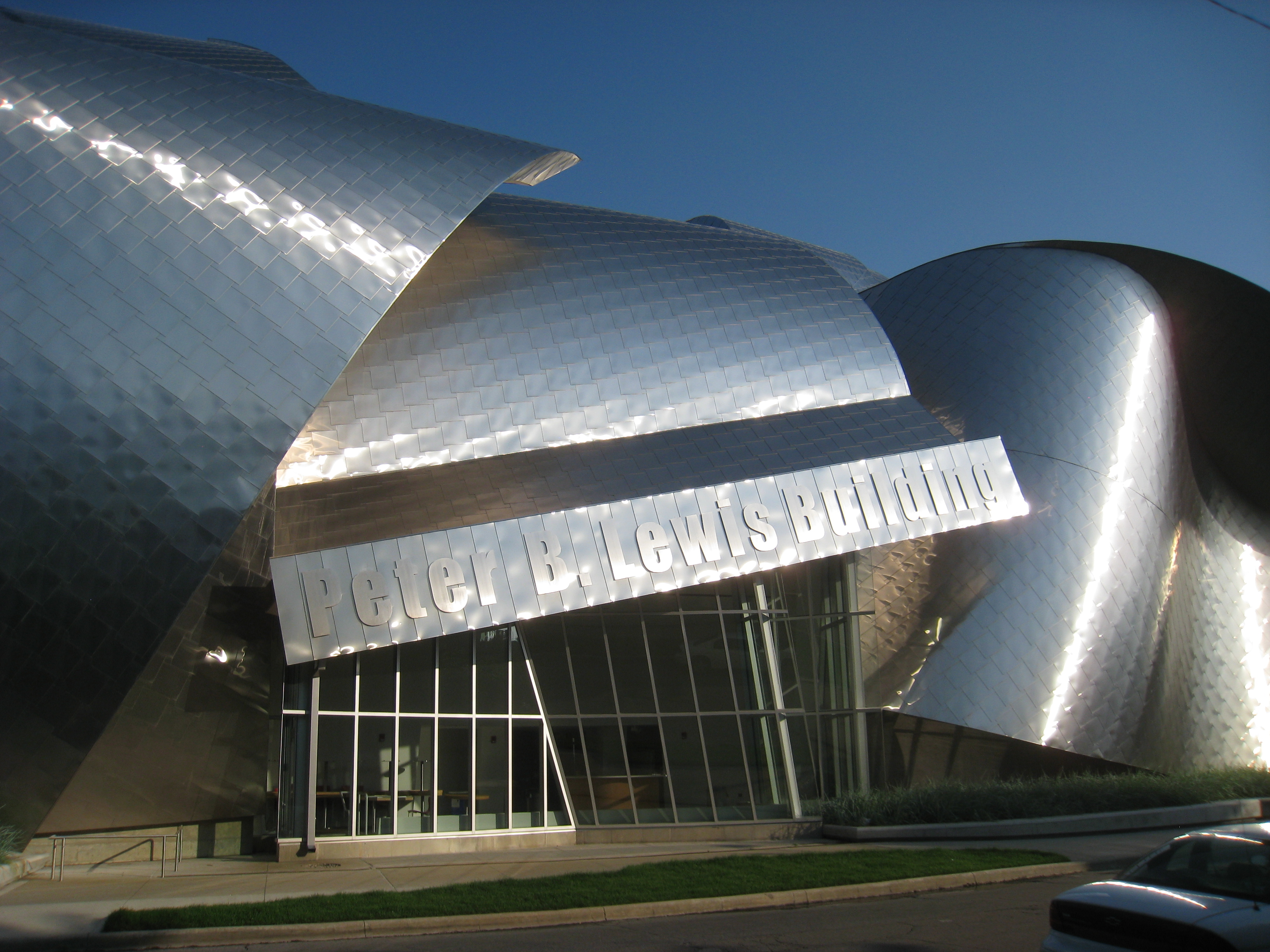
The main entrance of the Peter B. Lewis Building

The Weatherhead School of Management is housed in the Peter B. Lewis Building, located at the corner of Bellflower Road and Ford Drive. Designed by Frank Gehry and completed in 2002, the building has an area of approximately 150,000 square feet (14,000 m^{2}) and stands five stories tall. It is named after Cleveland philanthropist Peter B. Lewis, who donated $36.9 million towards its construction. The building's decentralized design was chosen so that, "Faculty offices, classrooms and meeting areas are distributed on every floor to encourage informal interaction and complement the Weatherhead School's learner-centered curricula."

== The Center for Business as an Agent of World Benefit ==
The Center was launched on June 24, 2004.

Much of the Center's effort in all three action domains – research, pedagogy, and outreach – were manifested in 2006 at the Global Forum for Business as an Agent of World Benefit convened by the Case Weatherhead School of Management, the Academy of Management, and the United Nations Global Compact. The Forum attracted more than 400 leading scholars and business leaders from 40 countries; another 600 participated virtually. The Center created new partners for the school, including Toyota, Coca-Cola, Novartis, Lafarge, Sherwin Williams, Green Mountain Coffee Roasters, and others.

== Academic programs ==
=== Undergraduate ===
Weatherhead offers traditional four-year programs in the following areas:

- BS in Accounting - For students pursuing the BS in accounting, integrated study options enable attainment of a Master's of Accountancy degree in five years or less, satisfying the 150-hour requirement to sit for the CPA examination in most states.
- BS in Management (with majors in either Finance or Marketing)
- BA in Economics

All students in the undergraduate program are able to pursue minors in accounting, economics, entrepreneurship, finance, leadership, or marketing. Students pursuing a degree in engineering can partake in a specialized sequence offered by Weatherhead. Engineering students can pursue a minor in economics or management, and sequences in economics and management/entrepreneurship.

=== MBA ===
Business school rankings

U.S. MBA Rankings
- Bloomberg (2025): 59
- U.S. News & World Report (2025): 52

Global MBA Rankings
- FT (2026): 94

- Full-time/Traditional: A traditional 2-year program with a variety of electives and experiential learning opportunities.
- Global MBA: A full-time MBA program in which students study for a semester each in China, India, and the United States (Cleveland, Ohio).
- Part-time: A 3-year program that offers the same business concepts of the full-time MBA program. Designed to meet the time constraints of employed students.
- Executive MBA: Participants in the EMBA program arrive with an average of 15 years of professional experience and aim to ascend to senior leadership roles.

Dual Degrees:

In late 2008, Weatherhead consolidated many of its programs under two separate but interdisciplinary core initiatives.

Weatherhead’s joint degree programs offer a complementary education strategy to enable connections between the MBA program and a specific industry career concentration. Programs available include:

- MBA/JD (Juris Doctor)
- MBA/MSSA (Master of Science in Social Administration)
- MBA/MAcc (Master in Accounting)
- MBA/MD (Medical Doctorate)
- MBA/MIM (Master in International Management)
- MBA/MSN (Master of Science in Nursing)
- MBA/MPH (Master of Public Health)
- MBA/MSM - Operations Research
- MBA/MSM - Supply Chain Management
- MBA/MGM (Master in Global Management)
- MBA/MS-Medical Physiology
- MBA/MS-Biochemistry

Dual Degree Collaboration:

- MSM-Finance and Tongji MBA Dual-Degree Program

== PhD Programs ==
The Weatherhead School of Management offers PhD degrees in disciplines such as information systems and organizational behavior. In 2010, the Financial Times ranked the school's doctoral programs 13th in the world.

=== Doctor of Management (DM) and PhD in Management ===
The Doctor of Management is a 54-credit-hour, three-year lock-step program for people intending a business, rather an academic, career, and is based on the expectation that the practitioner-scholar will develop the ability to think critically about problems confronting an organization. The D.M. degree was pioneered at Case Western Reserve.

The PhD in Management prepares interdisciplinary scholar-practitioners for academic careers. Candidates may specialize in one of three areas: Accountancy, Designing Sustainable Systems and Design & Innovation.

=== PhD in Management - Accountancy ===
The PhD in Accountancy program is structured and a student study plan is developed to support quality research and effective teaching based upon knowledge and skill levels appropriate to a student's goals. Doctoral students work with faculty whose research investigates matters of importance to academics, practitioners, and policy makers. The program is designed to take four years including dissertation.

=== PhD in Management - Designing Sustainable Systems ===
The Designing Sustainable Systems track is an extension of the Doctor in Management program. This track represents a new model of doctoral education in management. It takes a broader, evidence-based approach to management issues.

=== PhD in Management - Design & Innovation ===
The PhD in management consists of coursework in three areas and a dissertation. There are two specializations within the Design & Innovation doctoral program: Marketing and Information Systems. The program generally takes four to five years to complete.

=== PhD in Organizational Behavior ===
Weatherhead's PhD in Organizational Behavior is designed for full-time, year-round engagement. The program is generally completed in four to five years.

== Executive education ==
The Weatherhead School has offered executive education for over 30 years. The Weatherhead Executive Education program offers teaching in emotional intelligence, organizational development, health care management, entrepreneurship, innovation, women’s leadership and social impact management.

=== Executive Doctor of Management (EDM) ===
The Executive Doctor of Management (EDM) Program comprises 54 credit hours organized into interdependent areas of study. The program's classes are offered at one 4-day and five 2-day residencies each semester.

Faculty at the Weatherhead school also advise doctoral students in accounting, management, operations research, and organizational behavior. (Technically, degrees are conferred by the School of Graduate Studies at Case Western Reserve University.)

== People ==
=== Alumni ===
- Victor Ciorbea, former prime minister of Romania, specialized in management in 1992.
- Subir Gokarn, deputy governor of Reserve Bank of India, received his Ph.D. in economics in 1989.
- Kerstin Günther, senior vice president at Deutsche Telekom and chair of its subsidiary, Magyar Telekom, earned an MBA in finance in 1999.
- Michael McCaskey, chairman of the board of the Chicago Bears, awarded a Ph.D. in organizational behavior in 1971.
- Edward C. Prescott, 2004 Nobel Laureate in Economics, received his MS in operations research in 1964.
- Hayagreeva Rao, Atholl McBean Professor of Organizational Behavior and Human Resource, Stanford Graduate School of Business, Ph.D. 1989
- Donald E. Washkewicz, former chairman of the board and chief executive officer of Parker Hannifin Corporation, received an MBA in 1979.
- Mark Weinberger, global chairman & CEO of EY (formerly Ernst & Young), received an MBA and a JD in 1987.
- Milton A. Wolf, former U.S. ambassador to Austria, earned his Ph.D. in Economics in 1993.

=== May 2003 shooting and hostage crisis ===
On May 9, 2003, a gunman entered the school and went on a shooting spree, killing one student, Norman Wallace, and wounding a professor and a Ph.D. student. The suspect was later identified as 62-year-old Biswanath Halder, a 1999 alumnus and native of Calcutta, India. He held off police and SWAT officers for over seven hours, while approximately 100 people hid in offices and closets until they were rescued by police. Halder was ultimately apprehended by a SWAT team in a fifth floor classroom closet. He was convicted on multiple counts and sentenced to life in prison. An appeal in 2008 was denied. Halder died in prison in 2025.

== See also ==
- List of United States business school rankings
- List of business schools in the United States
