= Sanjay Jha (politician) =

Indian politician

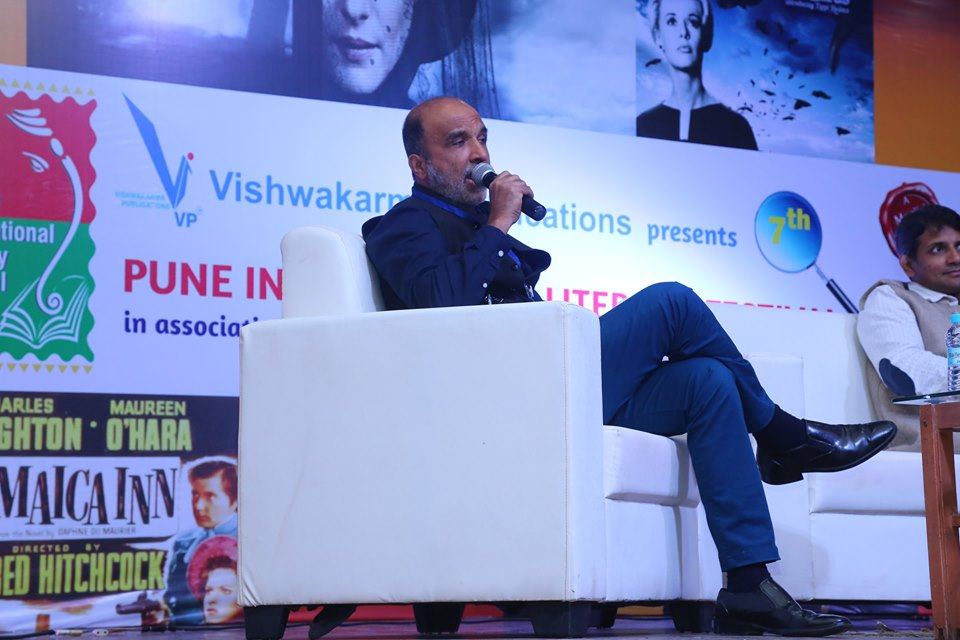
- Born: Bhagalpur, Bihar, India
- Organization: Dale Carnegie India
- Title: Former National Spokesperson
- Political party: Indian National Congress (INC)
- Spouse: Pallavi Jha
- Children: 2 Daughters
- Website: www.sanjayjha.com

Sanjay Jha is an Indian author, politician and a former national spokesperson for the Indian National Congress (INC) party. He is also the Former President of All India Professionals Congress, Maharashtra. Jha is the executive director of Dale Carnegie Training operations in India.

== Education ==
Sanjay Jha did his schooling at Mount Carmel School (Bhagalpur) and at The Bishop's School (Pune). Thereafter he was graduated with distinction in economics from Fergusson College, Pune. He then completed his post graduation in economics from Gokhale Institute of Politics and Economics, Pune. He also holds an MBA degree from the XLRI - Xavier School of Management, Jamshedpur.

== Career ==
=== Political career ===
Jha was the national spokesperson for the Indian National Congress party until he was dismissed by Sonia Gandhi from the position on 14 July 2020. He was also the President of All India Professionals Congress, Maharashtra.

=== Literary career ===
Jha has written columns for Congress mouthpiece National Herald, Yahoo.com, The Huffington Post and the DailyO of Indian Today Group. He has written a cricket anthology, 11 Triumphs, Trials and Turbulence: Indian cricket, 2003-2010 and co-authored another book on leadership with Myra White called The Superstar Syndrome: The Making of a Champion.

== Views ==
In a tweet, he claimed that Subramanian Swamy was a CIA agent on 25 April 2014, citing WikiLeaks. Swamy served legal notice to Jha on 12 May and sued him for INR 3 crores. He then tendered an apology to Swamy and added that his comments were just spontaneous reaction to a WikiLeaks expose which mentioned connections of Swamy with the CIA.

In April 2014, Jha tweeted that Atal Bihari Vajpayee was the "weakest" Prime Minister of India, which drew strong reactions from the Bharatiya Janata Party ( BJP), and led to his own party distancing themselves from the remarks.

In November 2017 he shared photoshopped pictures of BJP leaders and later apologised.

On 28 March 2019, he tweeted that Prime Minister Narendra Modi; "has white hair. But he sounds more like a blonde." drawing widespread criticism with the remarks being labeled sexist. Jha also claimed that indelible voting ink used in the 2019 Indian general election to mark those voters that had already cast ballots was easily removable with nail polish.

In 2020 he was sacked as the spokesperson of the Indian National Congress. The party justified his suspension as "anti-party activities" and "breach of discipline".
