= Weatherchem =

Packaging company

Mold-Rite Plastics (formally Weatherchem Corporation)
- Company type: Packaging and containers
- Industry: Packaging
- Founded: 1971, Twinsburg, Ohio
- Headquarters: Twinsburg, Ohio

Weatherchem is a company managing plastic dispensing for packaging headquartered in Twinsburg, Ohio.

== General ==
Founded with the acquisition of Akheny Co. in 1971, Weatherchem created the original Flapper dispensing closure. Weatherchem's customers include manufacturers of food, chemical and personal-care products. The caps are injection-molded and made from polypropylene.

== Products ==
Weatherchem's original Flapper Dispensing Closure was made in 1983. This technology was made in food industry by such companies as McCormick, and other uses such as healthcare. In 2006, the company introduced four new products: the Grinder NR, LiquiFlapper, FlapMate and NutraGen II to expand the management of plastic dispensing.

== Historical highlights ==
- 1971 Albert J. Weatherhead acquires Ankeny Co. and renames it Weatherchem Corporation
- 2006 Joins GMA-SAFE audit program
- 2012 Weatherchem Corporation was acquired by Mold-Rite Plastics.
