= Ascent of the A-Word =

Geoffrey Nunberg book

Ascent of the A-Word: Assholism, the First Sixty Years
- Author: Geoffrey Nunberg
- Publisher: PublicAffairs
- Publication date: August 14, 2012
- Pages: 271
- ISBN: 978-1610391757

Ascent of the A-Word: Assholism, the First Sixty Years is a 2012 book by the American linguist Geoffrey Nunberg which analyzes the history of the epithet "asshole".

== Overview ==
In Ascent, Nunberg traces to World War II the origins of the word as an epithet, when it was used as a term of abuse for superior officers considered abusive or self-important. (Note: Other etymologies date its origin earlier, e.g., the mid-1930s. Dictionary.com, "asshole", in Online Etymology Dictionary. Douglas Harper, Historian. Accessed 2012.09.24.) Following the soldiers' return home from the war, the term spread to "movement radicals", and, by the 1970s, to everyday discourse as a replacement for "heel", "cad" and other milder insults. According to Nunberg, the Internet has further solidified the word's place in the English language.

Popularized in part by author and Army veteran Norman Mailer in his 1948 novel The Naked and the Dead, the term continued to spread into popular culture via the works of Woody Allen and Neil Simon. Nunberg suggests that there are more assholes on the right wing of American politics than the left (he includes Rush Limbaugh and Bill O'Reilly as prominent examples), but allows that the left wing has its share as well: "the genius of Rush Limbaugh and Stephen Colbert lies in their remarkable ability to convey the pure joy they take in being assholes without suggesting they suffer even the slightest pangs of conscience."

Nunberg argues that the use of the term generates a sense of solidarity among those who are not (they believe) assholes themselves; directing the epithet "asshole" towards a perceived asshole, though insulting, is tolerated: Nunberg calls one who does so an "anti-asshole, the person who can violate bourgeois conventions and social norms in the cause of punishing offenders".

== Reception ==
San Francisco Chronicle reviewer Glenn C. Altschuler described Ascent as "delightfully and devilishly trenchant and provocative book", praising Nunberg's "style and surgical precision". Kirkus Reviews characterized the book as an "often raucously funny account of what seems to be America’s most popular insult" which manages to be neither "exceedingly snarky" nor "overly academic and pretentious".
