= Management and Labour Studies =

- Discipline: Business, management, and labour studies
- Language: English
- Edited by: Sanjay Patro

Publication details
- History: Feb 2012
- Publisher: SAGE Publications
- Frequency: Quarterly

Standard abbreviations
- ISO 4: Manag. Labour Stud.

Indexing
- ISSN: 0258-042X (print); 2321-0710 (web)
- OCLC no.: 6168461

Links
- Journal homepage; Online access; Online archive

The Management and Labour Studies is a quarterly refereed journal that provides a platform for research and discussion in the areas of management, labour, and related subjects.

The journal is published by SAGE Publications, India in Association with the XLRI School of Business and Human Resources, Jamshedpur.

The journal is a member of the Committee on Publication Ethics (COPE).

== Abstracting and indexing ==
Management and Labour Studies is abstracted and indexed in:

- Research Papers in Economics (RePEc)
- DeepDyve
- J-Gate
