= Research in Organizational Behavior =

- Discipline: Organizational behavior
- Language: English
- Edited by: Arthur Brief, Barry Staw

Publication details
- History: 1979–present
- Publisher: Elsevier
- Impact factor: 2.100 (2019)

Standard abbreviations
- ISO 4: Res. Organ. Behav.

Indexing
- ISSN: 0191-3085 (print); 2468-1741 (web)
- LCCN: 79642648
- OCLC no.: 803539460

Links
- Journal homepage; Online archive

Research in Organizational Behavior is a peer-reviewed scientific journal covering research in the field of organizational behavior. It was established in 1979 and is published by Elsevier. The editors-in-chief are Jack Goncalo (University of Illinois Urbana-Champaign), Greta Hsu (University of California, Davis), and Laura Kray (University of California, Berkeley). According to the Journal Citation Reports, the journal has a 2019 impact factor of 2.100.
