= Asshole =

English insult describing the anus, usually used to refer to people

Asshole or arsehole
- Etymology: Compound of ass or arse and hole

Definition
- In a literal sense: Anus
- Figuratively: A stupid, incompetent, unpleasant, or detestable person

The word asshole (in North American English) or arsehole (in all other major varieties of the English language) is a vulgarism used to describe the anus, and often used pejoratively (as a type of synecdoche) to refer to people.

== History ==
The word arse in English derives from the Proto-Germanic (reconstructed) word *arsaz, from the Proto-Indo-European word *ors-, meaning "buttocks" or "backside". The combined form arsehole is first attested from 1500 in its literal use to refer to the anus. The word evolved from "arce-hoole" (circa 1400), as in Old English, the Latin word "anus" was glossed with earsðerl, literally "arse-thrill" (thrill being a noun with the original meaning of "hole" such as in nostril, meaning "nose hole").

The metaphorical use of the word to refer to the worst place in a region (e.g., "the arsehole of the world"), is first attested in print in 1865; the use to refer to a contemptible person is first attested in 1933.

In the ninth chapter of his 1945 autobiography, Black Boy, Richard Wright quotes a snippet of verse that uses the term: "All these white folks dressed so fine / Their ass-holes smell just like mine ...".

Its earliest known usage in newspaper as an insult was 1965. As with other vulgarities, these uses of the word may have been common in oral speech for some time before their first appearances in print. By the 1970s, Hustler magazine featured people they did not like as "Asshole of the Month."

In 1972, Jonathan Richman of Modern Lovers recorded his song "Pablo Picasso", which includes the line "Pablo Picasso was never called an asshole."

Until the early 1990s, the word was considered one of a number of words that could not be uttered on commercial television in the United States. Comedian Andrew Dice Clay caused a major shock when he uttered the word during a televised MTV awards show in 1989. However, there were PG-13 and R rated films in the 1980s that featured use of the word, such as the R-rated The Terminator (1984), the PG-13-rated National Lampoon's Christmas Vacation (1989), and the PG-rated Back to the Future (1985). By 1994, however, vulgarity had become more acceptable, and the word was featured in dialog on the long-running television series NYPD Blue, though it has yet to become anything close to commonplace on network TV. In some broadcast edits (such as the syndication airings of South Park), the word is partially bleeped out, as "assh—". A variant of the term, "ass clown", was coined and popularized by the 1999 comedy film Office Space.

== Semantics ==
The word is mainly used as a vulgarity, generally to describe people who are viewed as stupid, incompetent, unpleasant, or detestable. Moral philosopher Aaron James, in his 2012 book, Assholes: A Theory, gives a more precise meaning of the word, particularly to its connotation in the United States: A person, who is almost always male, who considers himself of much greater moral or social importance than everyone else; who allows himself to enjoy special advantages and does so systematically; who does this out of an entrenched sense of entitlement; and who is immunized by his sense of entitlement against the complaints of other people. He feels he is not to be questioned, and he is the one who is chiefly wronged.

This word or its literal translation is found in colloquial speech in a number of cultures besides English because it describes both an intimate part as well as an organ for defecation, both of which are considered to be taboo parts of the body in many societies.

The English word ass (meaning donkey, a cognate of its zoological name Equus asinus) — homonymous to the word ass meaning buttocks but etymologically unrelated — may also be used as a term of contempt, referring to a silly or stupid person. In the United States (and, to a lesser extent, Canada), the words arse and ass have become synonymous.

== Political usage ==
In 2000, during a Labor Day event, then-candidate George W. Bush made an offhand remark to his running mate, Dick Cheney, that The New York Times reporter Adam Clymer was a "major league asshole." The gaffe was caught on microphone and led to a political advertisement chiding Bush for "using expletives... in front of a crowd of families," produced for Democratic opponent Al Gore.

In February 2004, American media reported that during a rally of supporters, Venezuelan President Hugo Chávez was reported to have called Bush "an asshole" for believing his aides in supporting a coup against Chávez in 2002. In September of the following year, Nightline host Ted Koppel said to Chavez on national television: "I'm going to perhaps shock you a little, but these are your words. You called President Bush an asshole,"—to which Chavez replied, "I've said various things about him. I don't know if I actually used that word."

In 2008, the Liberal Democrat MP for Leeds North West, Greg Mulholland was recorded describing health minister Ivan Lewis as an arsehole after Lewis refused to let him intervene in a Westminster Hall debate on hospice funding. He later publicly defended his comment.

== See also ==
- Ascent of the A-Word
- The No Asshole Rule
