= Strategic Organization (journal) =

- Discipline: Strategic Management, Organization Studies
- Language: English
- Edited by: Oliver Alexy, Hans Berends, Charlotte Cloutier, David Gomulya, Matthew Kraatz, Caterina Moschieri, and Margarethe Wiersema

Publication details
- History: 2003-present
- Publisher: SAGE Publications
- Frequency: Quarterly
- Impact factor: 4.9 (2022)

Standard abbreviations
- ISO 4: Strateg. Organ.

Indexing
- ISSN: 1476-1270 (print); 1741-315X (web)
- LCCN: 2003233017
- JSTOR: straorga
- OCLC no.: 645355898

Links
- Journal homepage; Online access; Online archive

Strategic Organization is a quarterly peer-reviewed academic journal that covers the fields of strategic management and organization studies. Its editors-in-chief are Oliver Alexy (Technical University of Munich), Hans Berends, (Vrije Universiteit Amsterdam), Charlotte Cloutier (HEC Montréal), David Gomulya (Singapore Management University), Matthew Kraatz (University of Illinois), Caterina Moschieri (IE Business School), and Margarethe Wiersema (University of California Irvine). It was established in 2003 and is published by SAGE Publications.

== Abstracting and indexing ==
The journal is abstracted and indexed in Scopus and the Social Sciences Citation Index. According to the Journal Citation Reports, its 2022 impact factor is 4.9, ranking it 77th out of 154 journals in the category "Business" and 103rd out of 227 journals in the category "Management".
