= Sophie Wilson =

English computer scientist (born 1957)

Sophie Wilson CBE FRS FREng DistFBCS
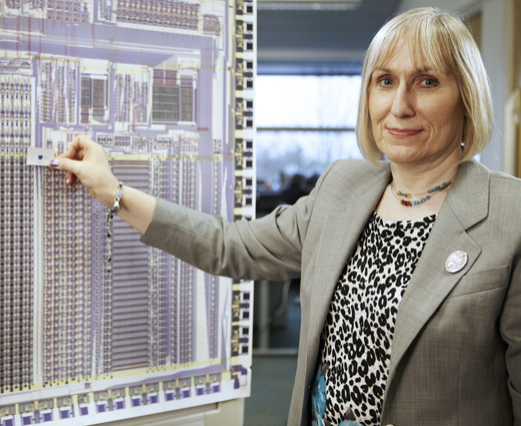
- Wilson in 2013
- Born: June 1957 (age 69); Leeds, England
- Education: Selwyn College, Cambridge; University of Cambridge
- Known for: Acorn Computers; BBC Micro; ARM architecture; BBC BASIC
- Awards: Fellow of the Royal Academy of Engineering (2009); Computer History Museum Fellow (2012); Fellow of the Royal Society (2013); Fellow of Selwyn College (2016); Honorary Doctorate (2017); Distinguished Fellow of the British Computer Society (2020)
- Scientific career
- Workplaces: University of Cambridge; Broadcom Corporation; Acorn Computers
- Website: www.sophie.org.uk; royalsociety.org/people/sophie-wilson-12544

Sophie Mary Wilson (born Roger Wilson; June 1957) is an English computer scientist, a co-designer of the instruction set for the ARM architecture.

Wilson first designed a microcomputer during a break from studies at Selwyn College, Cambridge. She subsequently joined Acorn Computers and was instrumental in designing the BBC Microcomputer, including the BBC BASIC programming language. She first began designing the ARM reduced instruction set computer (RISC) in 1983, which entered production two years later. It became popular in embedded systems and is now the most widely used processor architecture in smartphones. In 2011, she was listed in Maximum PC as number 8 in an article titled "The 15 Most Important Women in Tech History". She was made a Commander of the Order of the British Empire in 2019.

== Early life and education ==
Wilson was born in Leeds to schoolteacher parents, her father specialising in English and her mother in physics. She spent her childhood in the village of Burn Bridge, North Yorkshire. After secondary schooling at Harrogate Grammar School, in 1976 Wilson went up to Selwyn College, Cambridge, where she studied mathematics for her first two years, switching to computer science in her final year. She was a member of the university Microprocessor society.

== Career ==
Before going to university, Wilson had designed and built two electronic systems for ICI Fibres Research in Harrogate near her home village. The following year, in the 1977 summer vacation after her first year at university, she designed a small system around a MOS Technology 6502 microprocessor, which was used to electronically control feed for cows.

Wilson's success with the cow-feeder project and paper designs for a more general system based on it caught the notice of Hermann Hauser, at the time a Cambridge postgraduate student. Hauser was impressed, and supported Wilson to stay in Cambridge for the 1978 summer vacation to see if she could turn the design into reality. At the same time a small microcomputer kit, the MK14, was just being launched by Science of Cambridge, led by Chris Curry on behalf of Cambridge electronics businessman Clive Sinclair. Wilson was convinced she could do better, and Hauser encouraged her to do so, using parts from the MK14.

In December 1978 Hauser and Curry set up Cambridge Processor Unit Ltd (CPU), initially as a consultancy designing microprocessor-based control systems. Their first customer was Ace Coin Equipment Ltd, who needed controllers for their fruit machines, with Wilson designing a device to prevent cigarette lighter sparks triggering payouts. Meanwhile Wilson's computer design, combined with a cassette interface designed by Steve Furber, became the Acorn Micro-Computer, the first of a long line of computers sold by the company. Wilson started at the company in 1979.

Based on this processor board, CPU Ltd developed an increasing number of different interface, display, control, and test add-ons for different customers, which in turn led to the Acorn Eurocard rack systems that were made generally available, and then the Acorn Atom released in March 1980. Wilson, initially moonlighting from the final year of her degree, contributed first the machine code monitor, then an assembler, then a version of BASIC and multiple device drivers for the machines ("an incredible task of bootstrapping things up"), as well as pitching in with everything else in the office.

=== BBC Micro ===
Wilson was at the forefront of creating the prototype that enabled Acorn to win the contract with the British Broadcasting Corporation (BBC) for their ambitious computer education project.

The BBC had planned that the centrepiece of their project would be an upcoming TV series that would relate the possibilities that computers were opening up to demonstrations shown running on a standard reference microcomputer, that viewers would then be able to experiment with themselves. However by the end of 1980 it had become clear that the BBC's intended machine, the government-backed Newbury Newbrain, would not be able to meet either the capability or the timetable the BBC sought, and the programme team began an urgent search for other options. Curry pressed the already existing Acorn Atom, but when this was rejected at the start of February 1981 as being too limited and too non-standard, Curry instead offered for the BBC to come to Cambridge the following week to view a prototype of Acorn's next computer – a machine that in reality did not as yet exist, beyond some general design discussion and a name, the Acorn Proton. Hauser employed a deception, telling both Wilson and colleague Steve Furber that the other had agreed a prototype could be built within a week. Taking up the challenge, the Acorn team designed the system including the circuit board and components from Monday to Wednesday, which required fast new DRAM integrated circuits to be sourced directly from Hitachi. By Thursday evening, a prototype had been built, but it was only on Friday morning that it was actually working, allowing Wilson (who had managed to catch a few hours sleep in the night) to start porting over an operating system, in time to be able to show it consistently drawing a line to a high-res graphics screen by the time the BBC arrived, with full text and graphics on screen by the time the BBC returned from an unproductive visit to the nearby Sinclair Research.

The Proton was accepted to become the BBC Micro, with it falling to Wilson to develop its operating system and its version of BASIC, BBC BASIC – at 16K and 16K respectively a fourfold increase on the 4K and 4K of the Atom, including a full set of floating point mathematical routines. Wilson's "Acorn SuperBASIC" development had reached about 10K by the time of the BBC's visit, and she was keen to preserve the improvements she considered she had made with Acorn System BASIC over previous versions of the language. But the BBC, in particular their external consultant John Coll and BBC Engineering's Richard Russell, were adamant that the core established features of the language needed to be present with recognisably standard syntax. On the other hand extensions that Wilson had written to allow more structured programming in BASIC chimed closely with the BBC team's ambitions, and long fully-significant variable names, repeat/until loops, and multi-line procedures and functions with variables that could be declared local all became hallmarks of BBC BASIC. Work on the system design, operating system, and BASIC language (and fitting everything into the memory available) continued through the summer, and Wilson recalled watching the wedding of Prince Charles and Lady Diana Spencer in July 1981 on a small portable television while attempting to debug and re-solder the prototype. Along with Furber, Wilson was present backstage at the machine's first studio recordings for television, in case any software fixes were required. She later described the event as "a unique moment in time when the public wanted to know how this stuff works and could be shown and taught how to program."

=== ARM processor ===
In October 1983, Wilson began designing the instruction set for one of the first reduced instruction set computer (RISC) processors, the Acorn RISC Machine (ARM). The ARM1 was delivered on 26 April 1985 and worked first time, entering into production the same year. This processor type was later to become one of the most successful IP cores – a licensed CPU core – and by 2012 was being used in 95% of smartphones. Wilson also designed Acorn Replay, the video architecture for Acorn machines. This included operating system extensions for video access, as well as the codecs, optimised to run high frame rate video on ARM CPUs from the ARM 2 onwards.

She was a non-executive director of the technology and games company Eidos plc, which bought and created Eidos Interactive, for the years following its flotation in 1990. She was a consultant to ARM Ltd when it was split off from Acorn in 1990.

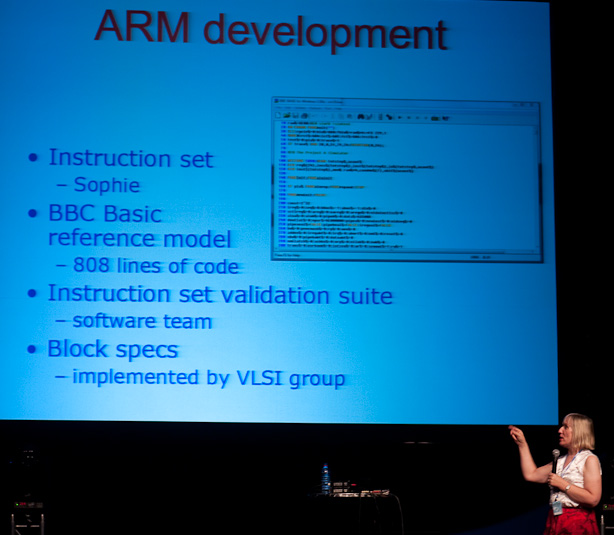
Wilson giving a public presentation on ARM development in 2009

Since the demise of Acorn Computers, Wilson has made a small number of public appearances to talk about work done there.

=== Firepath ===
Wilson was the Chief Architect of Broadcom's Firepath processor. Firepath has its history in Acorn Computers, which, after being renamed to Element 14, was broken up in an acquisition, with the Element 14 name being transferred to a new company, this company eventually being bought by Broadcom in 2000. In 2001 she became a research fellow and director at Broadcom.

Wilson was listed in 2011 in Maximum PC as number 8 in an article titled "The 15 Most Important Women in Tech History".

== Honours and awards ==
Wilson was awarded the Fellow Award by the Computer History Museum in California in 2012 "for her work, with Steve Furber, on the BBC Micro computer and the ARM processor architecture." In 2009, she was elected as a Fellow of the Royal Academy of Engineering and, in 2013, as a Fellow of the Royal Society. Wilson received the 2014 Lovie Lifetime Achievement Award in acknowledgement for her invention of the ARM processor. In 2016, she became an honorary fellow of her alma mater, Selwyn College, Cambridge, and was received the Royal Society Mullard Award with Furber for their work on ARM. In 2020, she was honoured as a Distinguished Fellow of the British Computer Society.

Wilson was appointed Commander of the Order of the British Empire (CBE) in the 2019 Birthday Honours for services to computing.

In 2022, the Charles Stark Draper Prize for Engineering was awarded in Washington D.C. to David A. Patterson, John L. Hennessy, Stephen B. Furber, and Sophie M. Wilson for their "invention, development, and implementation" of the RISC chips.

The Sophie Wilson scholarship for Scientific Computing was set up in 2024, and is co-funded by Wilson. It supports students to study in the MPhil in Scientific Computing at the University of Cambridge.

== Personal life ==
Wilson medically transitioned in 1994. She enjoys photography and is involved in a local theatre group, where she is in charge of costumes and set pieces and has acted in a number of productions. She has also played a cameo role as a pub landlady in the BBC television drama Micro Men, in which a younger Wilson is played by Stefan Butler.

== See also ==
- List of pioneers in computer science
- Lynn Conway
