= Allen Boothroyd =

British industrial designer (1943–2020)

Allen Boothroyd M Des RCA, FSCD, FRSA (1943–2020) was a British industrial designer of consumer electronics, best known for the Lecson amplifiers, BBC Microcomputer and co-founder of Meridian Audio.

== Career ==
Inspired by his Meccano set, Allen knew from an early age that he wanted to design mechanical objects. He went to Merchant Taylors’ school and, after a foundation year at Hornsey College of Art, went on to study Art and Design at Manchester. On graduating he obtained a scholarship to the Industrial Design department at the Royal College of Art in London. During his time there, he designed hoppers for moving books around in a bookshop, a hospital bed, a parking meter, and received a prize for his pushchair design. He was a great admirer of the designers and architects of the Bauhaus, notably Walter Gropius who designed the Dessau Art School, and Mies van der Rohe whose adage, ‘less is more’, Allen adhered to and often quoted.

When Allen graduated from the Royal College of Art in the 1960s, not many people knew what an industrial designer did. He was always at pains to explain that it was not just a question of the product's appearance: it encompassed all the production engineering and mechanical stages to take a product from concept to market. He was a talented draftsman and, for most of his professional life, Allen's designs were produced by hand, with 3D visuals as well as detailed engineering drawings.

On graduation, he joined Hulme Chadwick and Partners, an architectural and design practice. His work there included the design of a new corporate identity for Bass Charrington.

== Designs ==
Allen Boothroyd and Bob Stuart, 2012

Together with Bob Stuart, an award-winning electronics engineer, they designed the Lecson AC1 pre-amp and AP1 power amplifier which they produced in 1974. The Lecson hi-fi is now in the permanent collections of the Victoria and Albert Museum, London and the Museum of Modern Art, New York. It also earned them their first British Design Council Award in 1974.

Allen joined Cambridge Consultants Ltd in 1972 to set up their Industrial Design division. One of his designs was an electric bicycle, which was the winner of the Prince Philip Designers Prize.

In 1981, he provided the case design for the BBC Micro, the computer used in the BBC’s Computer Literacy Project. He also worked on the design for the Acorn RiscPC computer.

Meanwhile, Bob had also moved to Cambridge and together he and Allen founded Boothroyd Stuart Meridian (later Meridian Audio Ltd). They designed, manufactured, and sold the entire product range themselves, with very little investment. Allen and Bob received their second Design Council Award for the company's 100 Series in 1982. In 1986, a new line – the 200 Series – was launched and continued to be produced until 1993 when it was replaced by the 500 Series. It grew to include the whole range of domestic hi-fi, from CD players, radio tuners, pre-amplifiers, power amplifiers, digital-to-analogue converters, and a range of multi-room components, all designed by Bob and Allen. A series of active loudspeakers (with on-board amplifiers) was developed and brought to market starting in 1977. By this time, Meridian Audio had become known for its state-of-the-art electronics, distinctive design style, and corporate identity. In 1988, Bob and Allen were presented with another Design Council Award by the Duke of Edinburgh, becoming the first design team to win this award three times.

In 1991, Allen founded his own consultancy, Cambridge Product Design Ltd., offering one-stop design solutions, which he ran from his home in Little Shelford. Early designs included a new class of loudspeaker for Canon, the first Patientline (providing a phone/TV/Radio console for hospital patients), the Aga Masterchef range cooker, a coffee machine, timpani drums, and different types of loudspeaker for KEF, Celestion, THX, Russound and Pioneer. He continued as design director of Meridian Audio. Pioneer commissioned Boothroyd to produce a unique appearance for its new surround-sound speaker system. His design was used in the Pioneer Elite Reference speaker system.

== Recognition and later life ==
Allen was elected Fellow of the Royal Society of Arts for the Encouragement of Arts, Manufactures and Commerce and the Royal Society of Illustrators, Artists and Designers.

Allen's semi-retirement provided time for him to indulge his hobbies: drawing and painting, tennis, golf, and music. From the 1990s, he would always take his sketch pad on holiday and took pleasure in sitting in front of a historic building or view that captured his imagination. He was instrumental in the fundraising and design for a new village hall in Little Shelford and created the elegant village sign. Later on, he led sessions of the Pavilion Art Group, helping artists to develop their skills. Listening to music was always an important part of Allen's life – in particular classical, jazz, and popular music.

Allen was diagnosed with advanced prostate cancer and died while being treated in February 2020.

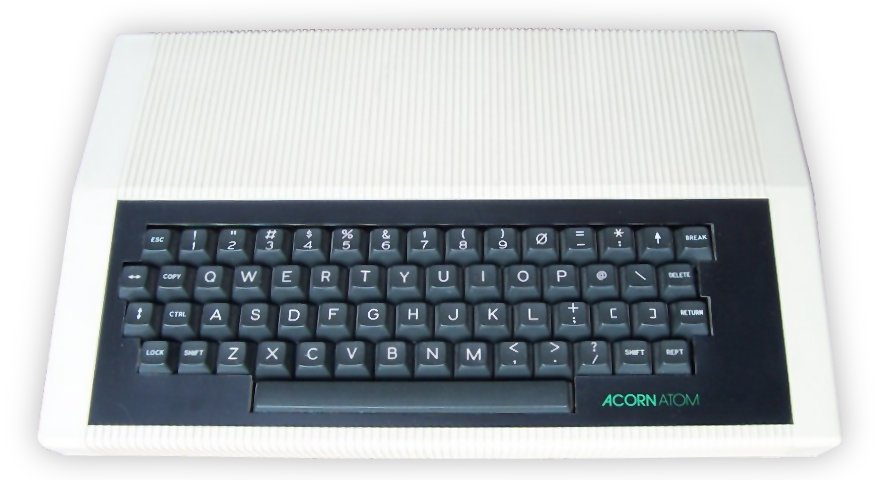
Functions as keyboard for the Acorn System 2 and as case for the Acorn Atom.

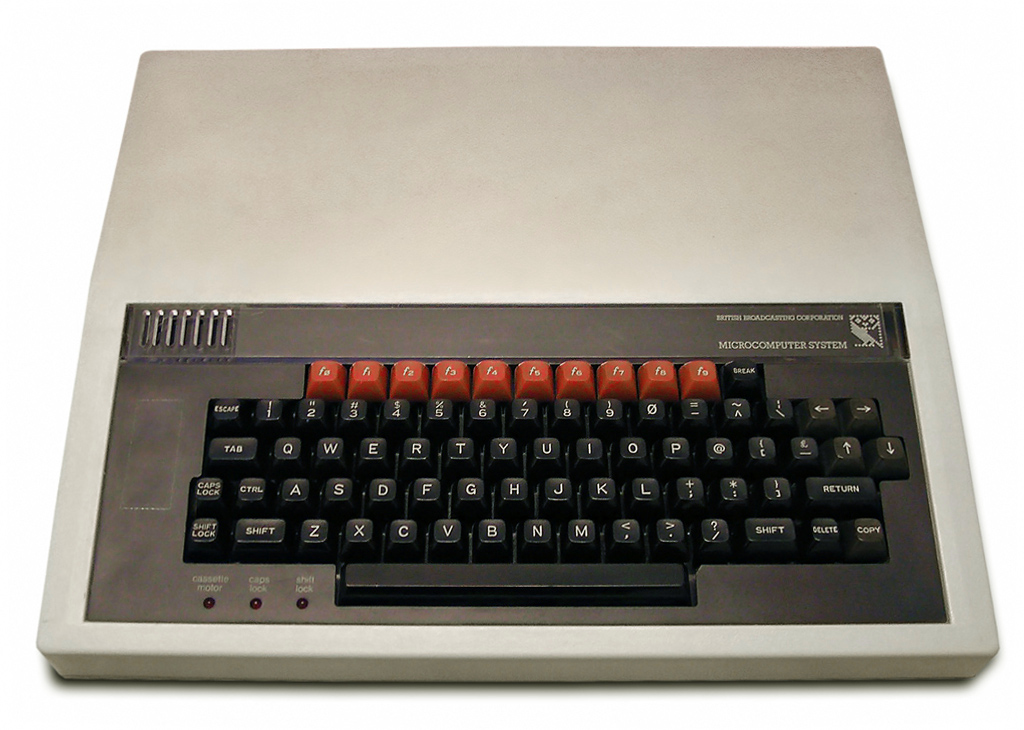
The BBC Micro.
