= RiscLua =

Implementation of Lua to RISC OS

- Paradigm: Scripting Language
- Designed by: Gavin Wraith
- First appeared: 2002
- OS: RISC OS
- Website: www.wra1th.plus.com/lua/risclua.html

RiscLua is an implementation of Lua to RISC OS. It has minor syntactic modifications from standard Lua so that its riscos library can provide system calls, with a syntax similar to that of BBC Basic.

RiscLua has been developed since 2002 with the intention of providing for RISC OS a more modern alternative to BBC Basic. Previous versions were made with the Norcroft C compiler which had no facilities for dynamic linking. So the riscos and lpeg libraries were provided statically linked. Furthermore, until recently, RISC OS was only implemented on platforms whose CPUs did not afford floating point arithmetic in hardware. For that reason previous versions differed from standard Lua in only providing 32-bit integers. The current version, however, is effectively standard Lua.
