= Acorn Atom =

Acorn Computers home computer, 1980–1982

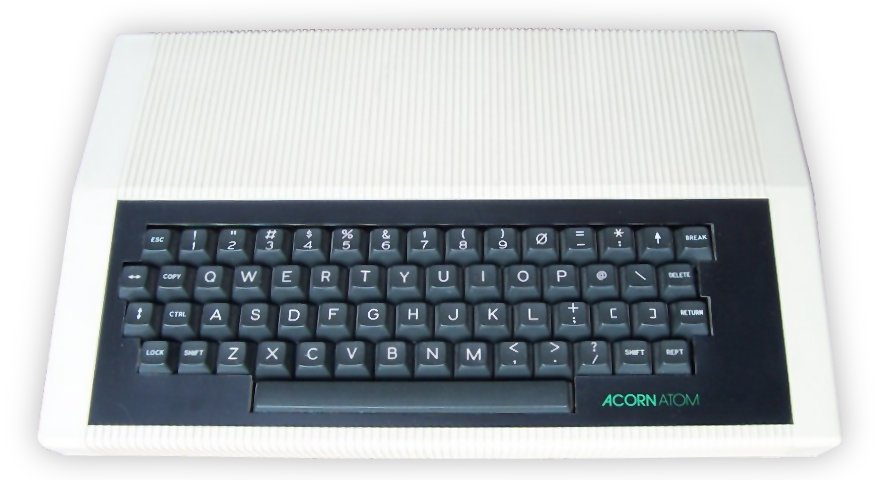
- Manufacturer: Acorn Computers
- Type: Personal Computer
- Released: March 1980; 46 years ago
- Introductory price: £120 (in kit form), £170 (assembled)
- Discontinued: 1983
- Media: 100KB 5¼-inch floppy disk Cassette tape
- CPU: 1 MHz 6502
- Memory: 2 KB RAM (expandable to 12 KB), 8 KB ROM (expandable to 12 KB)
- Display: 64×64 (4 colours); 64×96 (4 colours); 128×96 (monochrome); 64×192 (4 colours); 128×192 (2 colours); 256×192 (monochrome)
- Sound: 1 channel, internal speaker
- Input: Keyboard
- Power: 8V, 1.5A unregulated DC; 5V regulated inside
- Dimensions: 381×241×64 mm
- Predecessor: Acorn System 3
- Successor: BBC Micro

The Acorn Atom is a home computer made by Acorn Computers from 1980 to 1983, when it was replaced by the Acorn Electron as Acorn's low cost option to the BBC Micro.

The Atom was a progression of the MOS Technology 6502-based machines that the company had been making from 1979. The Atom was a cut-down Acorn System 3 without a disk drive but with an integral keyboard and cassette tape interface, sold in either kit or complete form. In 1980 it was priced between £120 in kit form, £170 (equivalent to £729 in 2025) ready assembled, to over £200 for the fully expanded version with 12 KB of RAM and the floating-point extension ROM.

== Hardware ==
The minimum Atom had 2 KB of RAM and 8 KB of ROM, with the maximum specification machine having 12 KB of each. An additional floating-point ROM was also available. The 2 KB of RAM was divided between 1 KB of Block Zero RAM (including the 256 bytes of "zero page") and 512 bytes for the screen (text mode) and only 512 bytes for programs (presumably in text mode, mode 0, and graphics not available), i.e. written in the BASIC language. When expanded up to a total of 12 KB RAM, the split is 1 KB, 5 KB for programs, and up to 6 KB for the high-resolution graphics (the screen memory could be expanded independently from the lower part of the address space). If the high-resolution graphics were not required then up to 5½ KB of the upper memory could additionally be used for program storage. The first 1 KB, i.e. Block Zero, was used by the CPU for stack storage, by the OS, and by the Atom BASIC for storage of the variables.

It had an MC6847 Video Display Generator (VDG) video chip, allowing for both text and graphics modes. It could be connected to a TV or modified to output to a video monitor. Basic video memory was 1 KB but could be expanded to 6 KB. Since the MC6847 could only output at 60 Hz, meaning that the video could not be resolved on a large proportion of European TV sets, a 50 Hz PAL colour card was later made available. Nine video modes were available, with resolutions from 64×64 in 4 colours, up to 256×192 in monochrome. At the time, 256×192 was considered to be high resolution.

The case was designed by industrial designer Allen Boothroyd of Cambridge Product Design Ltd.

== Software ==
It had a built-in minor variation of Acorn System BASIC, a fast but idiosyncratic version of the BASIC programming language developed by Sophie Wilson, which included indirection operators (similar to PEEK and POKE) for bytes and words (of 4 bytes each); the use of a semi-colon to separate statements on the same line of code (instead of the colon used by most if not all other versions of BASIC); and the option of labels rather than line numbers for GOTO and GOSUB commands, although line numbers could also be used. Assembly code could be included within a BASIC program, because the BASIC interpreter also contained an assembler for the 6502 assembly language which assembled the inline code during program execution and then executed it. This was unusual.

String handling was based on arrays of characters, and only 27 string variables could be used ($@ and $A to $Z). A byte vector @() to Z() could be DIMensioned and then referred to with the string operator $A to be treated as a string. This sample program, adapted from Atomic Theory and Practice, demonstrates some of Atom BASIC's peculiarities:

    1 REM Encoder/Decoder
   10 S=TOP; ?12=0
   20 INPUT'"CODE NUMBER"T; REM Use code number to seed random number generator
   30 !8=ABS(T)
   40 INPUT'$S
   50 FOR P=S TO S+LEN(S); REM For each character, if it is a letter add the next random number to it, modulo 26.
   60 IF ?P<#41 GOTO 100
   70 R=ABS(RND)%26
   80 IF T<0 THEN R=26-R
   90 ?P=(?P-#41+R)%26+#41
  100 NEXT P
  110 PRINT $S
  120 GOTO 40

In late 1982, Acorn released an upgrade board for the Atom which allowed users to switch between Atom BASIC and the more advanced "BBC BASIC" used by the BBC Micro. The upgrade was purely to the programming language; the Atom's hardware capabilities remained unchanged, and hence, contrary to some pre-release beliefs, the BBC BASIC ROM did not allow Atom users to run commercial BBC Micro software, since nearly all of it took advantage of the BBC machine's much more advanced graphics and sound hardware and greater RAM capacity. Commercial BBC Micro cassettes could not have been loaded anyway, as they ran at a transfer rate of 1200 baud and the Atom's cassette interface only supported 300 baud.

The following is the memory map for the Atom. Shaded areas indicate those present on the minimal system.

| Hex Address | Contents | Annotations |
|---|---|---|
| 0000 | Block Zero RAM | 1 KB RAM |
| 0400 | Teletext VDG RAM | |
| 0800 | VDG CRT Controller | |
0900
| 0A00 | Optional FDC | |
0A80
| 1000 | Peripherals space | |
| 2000 | Catalogue buffer | |
| 2200 | Sequential File buffers | |
| 2800 | Floating-point variables | Internal RAM; 5 KB max. |
| 2900 | Extension Text space RAM | Internal RAM; 5 KB max. |
| 3C00 | Off-board Extension RAM | |
| 8000 | 8000-81FF for mode 0 (512 bytes text) | Video and BASIC RAM; 6 KB max. |
| | 8000-83FF for mode 1 (1 KB graphics) | Video and BASIC RAM; 6 KB max. |
| | 8000-85FF for mode 2 (1.5 KB graphics) | Video and BASIC RAM; 6 KB max. |
| | 8000-8BFF for mode 3 (3 KB graphics) | Video and BASIC RAM; 6 KB max. |
| | 8000-97FF for mode 4 (6 KB graphics) | Video and BASIC RAM; 6 KB max. |
| 9800 | | |
| A000 | Optional Utility ROM | |
| B000 | PPIA I/O Device | |
| B800 | Optional VIA I/O Device for Printer Interface | |
| C000 | ATOM BASIC Interpreter | 4 KB ROM |
| D000 | Optional Extension ROM | |
| E000 | Optional Disk Operating System | |
| F000 | Assembler | 4 KB ROM |
| F000 | Cassette Operating System | 4 KB ROM |

The manual for the Atom was called Atomic Theory and Practice and was written by David Johnson-Davies, subsequently managing director of Acornsoft.

The Acorn LAN, Econet, was first configured on the Atom.

== Specifications ==
- CPU: MOS Technology 6502
- Speed: 1 MHz
- RAM: 2 KB, expandable to 12 KB
- ROM: 8 KB, expandable to 12 KB with various Acorn and 3rd party ROMs
- Sound: 1 channel, integral loudspeaker
- Size: 381×241×64 mm
- I/O Ports: Computer Users' Tape Standard (CUTS) interface, TV connector, Centronics parallel printer
- Storage: Kansas City standard audio cassette interface
- Power: standard 2.1 mm power jack connector for 8 volts unregulated DC, providing 5 volts regulated inside the Atom

The Acorn 8V power supply was only rated to 1.5 amps, which was not enough for an Atom with fully populated RAM sockets. The Atom's two internal LM7805 regulators (each regulating the +5V for a section of the digital logic independently) also got uncomfortably hot. Therefore, some Atom enthusiasts removed and bypassed the internal regulators and powered their Atoms from an external 5V regulated power supply. Three amps were typically needed for a fully populated Atom.

There has never been a de facto standard for external 5V connections, but using the same 7-pin DIN connectors as the Atari 800XL allowed an Atari 5V linear power supply to drive an Atom, so long as the current was less than the Atari PSU rating (1 or 1.5 amps, depending on the model). These are now uncommon, but 5V wall-wart switch-mode power supplies capable of supplying several amps are a readily and cheaply available alternative.

== Variants and applications ==
The Atom was incorporated into a "complete dedicated spreadsheet system" known as the Prophet by a company called Busicomputers, with the second edition of this product, the Prophet 2, consisting of a modified Atom, Ferguson 12-inch black-and-white television, and a Pearlcorder microcassette recorder, all housed in a "robust metal case". Powered by a single mains plug, the system was effectively a "turnkey" solution, emphasising the built-in spreadsheet as its primary function. Although regarded as worth considering as an "inexpensive way of obtaining a sound and reasonably well-presented spreadsheet system", being priced at £795 plus VAT, the use of cassette storage to reduce the system's cost was regarded as impacting its usability, with the slow data transfer rate causing waits of 30 minutes or more to save spreadsheet data and limiting the effective storage capacity of the microcassettes, whereas more expensive disk-based systems would be able to transfer similar volumes of data in a matter of seconds and store tens of spreadsheets on each disk. Regarded as "low-tech" later in 1983, the Prophet II was apparently being given away to participants of one- or two-day business-related training courses, these costing £600 and £700 respectively, with this initiative considered "a nice way of moving old stock". A subsequent model, the Prophet 3, featured a built-in floppy disk drive.

== Video games ==
There are 50 (Note: This number is always up to date by this script) known commercial games released for the Acorn Atom.

| Name | Year | Publisher |
|---|---|---|
| 747 | 1981 | Bug-Byte |
| Adventure | 1981 | Program Power |
| Adventures | 1981 | Acornsoft |
| Atom Adventure | 1981 | Hopesoft |
| Atom Chess | 1981 | Acornsoft |
| Atom Man | 1982? | Hopesoft |
| Backgammon | 1981 | Bug-Byte |
| Breakout | 1981 | Bug-Byte |
| Business Game | 1982 | Program Power |
| Centipede | | Micromania |
| Chaser | 1982 | Hopesoft |
| Colour Invaders | 1982 | Hopesoft |
| Cylon Attack | 1982 | A&F Soft. |
| Death Satellite | 1982 | A&F Soft. |
| Defender | 1982 | Micromania |
| Demon Dungeon | 1980 | Program Power |
| Early Warning | 1982 | A&F Soft. |
| Fruit Machine | 1981 | Bug-Byte |
| Galaxian | 1981 | Bug-Byte |
| Galaxians | 1982 | Aardvark Soft. |
| Games Pack 1 | 1981 | Acornsoft |
| Games Pack 10 | 1981 | Acornsoft |
| Games Pack 2 | 1981 | Acornsoft |
| Games Pack 3 | 1981 | Acornsoft |
| Games Pack 4 | 1981 | Acornsoft |
| Games Pack 5 | 1981 | Acornsoft |
| Games Pack 6 | 1981 | Acornsoft |
| Games Pack 7 | 1981 | Acornsoft |
| Games Pack 8 | 1981 | Acornsoft |
| Games Pack 9 | 1981 | Acornsoft |
| Golf | 1981 | Bug-Byte |
| Hyperfire | 1982 | Program Power |
| Invaders | 1981 | Bug-Byte |
| Labyrinth | 1981 | Bug-Byte |
| Lunar Lander | 1981 | Bug-Byte |
| Minefield | 1982 | A&F Soft. |
| Omega Mission | 1982 | Micromania |
| Peeko-Computer | 1981 | Acornsoft |
| Pinball | 1981 | Bug-Byte |
| Pirate Island | 1982 | Hopesoft |
| Polecat | 1982 | A&F Soft. |
| Space Fighter | 1981 | Program Power |
| Space Panic | 1982 | A&F Soft. |
| Star Trek | 1981 | Bug-Byte |
| Swarm | 1981 | Program Power |
| Tangled | 1982 | A&F Soft. |
| The Africa Diamond | 1982 | Ramtronics |
| The Protector | 1982 | Micromania |
| UFO Bomber | 1981 | Bug-Byte |
| Zodiac | 1981 | A&F Soft. |
