= Q =

17th letter of the Latin alphabet

- Q q

Usage
- Writing system: Latin script
- Type: Alphabetic and logographic
- Language of origin: Greek language Latin language
- Sound values: (Table) [q] [k]
- In Unicode: U+0051, U+0071
- Alphabetical position: 17

History
Development
O34V24
    - 𐤒
      - 𐌒
        - Q q
- Time period: Unknown to present
- Descendants: • Ƣ • Ɋ • ℺ • Ԛ
- Sisters: Φ Ф ק ق ܩ ࠒ 𐎖 ቀ Փ փ Ֆ ֆ

Other
- Associated graphs: q(x)
- Writing direction: Left-to-right

Q (minuscule: q) is the seventeenth letter of the Latin alphabet, used in the modern English alphabet, the alphabets of other western European languages and others worldwide. Its name in English is pronounced /ˈkjuː/, most commonly spelled cue, but also kew, kue, and que.

== History ==
Egyptian hieroglyph wḏ	Phoenician Qoph	Western Greek Koppa	Etruscan Q	Latin Q
V24				Latin Q

The Semitic sound value of Qôp was /q/ (voiceless uvular stop), and the form of the letter could have been based on the eye of a needle, a knot, or even a monkey with its tail hanging down. /q/ is a sound common to Semitic languages, but not found in many European languages. (Note: See references at Voiceless uvular stop#Occurrence) In common with other glyphs derived from the Proto-Sinaitic script, the letter has been suggested to have its roots in Egyptian hieroglyphs.

In an early form of Ancient Greek, qoppa (Ϙ) probably came to represent several labialized velar stops, among them /kʷ/ and /kʷʰ/. As a result of later sound shifts, these sounds in Greek changed to /p/ and /pʰ/ respectively. Therefore, qoppa was transformed into two letters: qoppa, which stood for the number 90, and phi (Φ), which stood for the aspirated sound /pʰ/ that came to be pronounced /f/ in Modern Greek.

The Etruscans used Q in conjunction with V to represent /kʷ/, and this usage was copied by the Romans with the rest of their alphabet. In the earliest Latin inscriptions, the letters C, K and Q were all used to represent the two sounds /k/ and /ɡ/, which were not differentiated in writing. Of these, Q was used before a rounded vowel (e.g. ⟨EQO⟩ 'ego'), K before /a/ (e.g. ⟨KALENDIS⟩ 'calendis'), and C elsewhere. Later, the use of C (and its variant G) replaced most usages of K and Q: Q survived only to represent /k/ when immediately followed by a /w/ sound.

In Turkey between 1928 and 2013 the use of the letter Q, alongside X and W, was banned from official government documents, such as street signs and brochures as well as public places. The letter forms part of the Kurdish alphabet but is not present in Turkish.

=== Typographic variants ===
The five most common typographic presentations of the capital letter Q

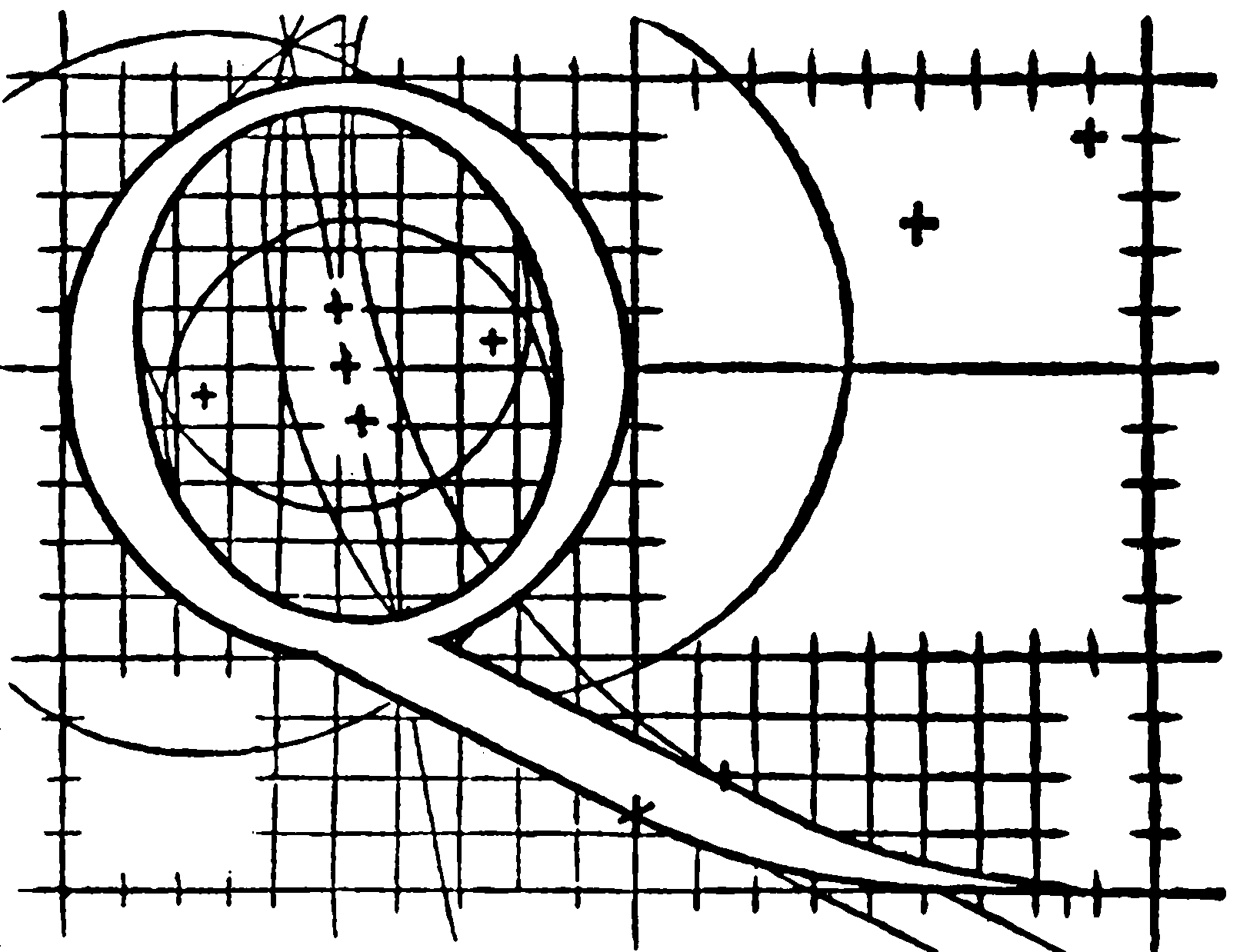
A long-tailed Q as drawn by French typographer Geoffroy Tory in his 1529 book, Champfleury

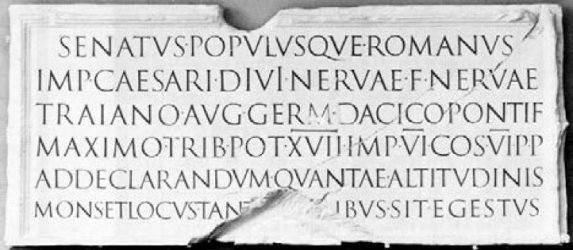
The printed long-tailed Q was inspired by ancient Roman square capitals: this long-tailed Q, used here in the Latin word "POPVLVSQVE", was carved into Trajan's Column c. AD 113.

A short trilingual text showing the proper use of the long- and short-tailed Q. The short-tailed Q is only used when the word is shorter than the tail; the long-tailed Q is even used in all-capitals text.

==== Uppercase "Q" ====
Depending on the typeface used to typeset the letter Q, the letter's tail may either bisect its bowl as in Helvetica, meet the bowl as in Univers, or lie completely outside the bowl as in PT Sans. In writing block letters, bisecting tails are the fastest to write, as they require less precision. All three styles are considered equally valid, with most serif typefaces having a Q with a tail that meets the circle, while sans-serif typefaces are more equally split between those with bisecting tails and those without. Typefaces with a disconnected Q tail, while uncommon, have existed since at least 1529. A common method among type designers to create the shape of the Q is by simply adding a tail to the letter O.

Old-style serif fonts, such as Garamond, may contain two uppercase Qs: one with a short tail to be used in short words, and another with a long tail to be used in long words. Some early metal type fonts included up to 3 different Qs: a short-tailed Q, a long-tailed Q, and a long-tailed Q-u ligature. This print tradition was alive and well until the 19th century, when long-tailed Qs fell out of favor; even recreations of classic typefaces such as Caslon began being distributed with only short Q tails. American typographer D. B. Updike, who was known to disapprove of the long-tailed Q, celebrated their demise in his 1922 book Printing Types, claiming that Renaissance printers made their Q tails longer and longer simply to "outdo each other". Latin-language words, which are much more likely than English words to contain "Q" as their first letter, have also been cited as the reason for their existence. The long-tailed Q had fallen out of use with the advent of early digital typography, as many early digital fonts could not choose different glyphs based on the word that the glyph was in, but it has seen something of a comeback with the advent of OpenType fonts and LaTeX, both of which can automatically typeset the long-tailed Q when it is called for and the short-tailed Q when it is not.

Owing to the allowable variation between letters, Q, like &, is often cited as a letter that gives type designers a greater opportunity for self-expression. Identifont is an automatic typeface identification service that identifies typefaces by asking questions about their appearance and later asks about the Q tail if the "sans-serif" option is chosen. In the Identifont database, the distribution of Q tails is:

Q tail type	Serif	Sans-serif
Bisecting	1461	2719
Meets bowl	3363	4521
Outside bowl	271	397
"2" shape ($\mathcal{Q}$)	304	428
Inside bowl	129	220
Total	5528	8285

Some type designers prefer one "Q" design over another: Adrian Frutiger, famous for the airport typeface that bears his name, remarked that most of his typefaces feature a Q tail that meets the bowl and then extends horizontally. Frutiger considered such Qs to make for more "harmonious" and "gentle" typefaces. "Q" often makes the list of their favorite letters; for example, Sophie Elinor Brown, designer of Strato, has listed "Q" as being her favorite letter.

==== Lowercase "q" ====
A comparison of the glyphs of ⟨q⟩ and ⟨g⟩

The lowercase "q" is usually seen as a lowercase "o" or "c" with a descender (i.e., downward vertical tail) extending from the right side of the bowl, with or without a swash (i.e., flourish), or even a reversed lowercase p. The "q"'s descender is usually typed without a swash due to the major style difference typically seen between the descenders of the "g" (a loop) and "q" (vertical). When handwritten, or as part of a handwriting font, the descender of the "q" sometimes finishes with a rightward swash to distinguish it from the letter "g" (or, particularly in mathematics, from the digit "9").

== Use in writing systems ==
Pronunciation of ⟨q⟩ or ⟨qu⟩ by language
Orthography	Spelling	Phonemes
Afar	⟨q⟩	/ʕ/
Albanian	⟨q⟩	/c/
Azeri	⟨q⟩	/ɡ/
Catalan	⟨qu⟩ or ⟨qü⟩	/kw/ or /k/
Standard Chinese (Pinyin)	⟨q⟩	/t͡ɕʰ/
Crimean	⟨q⟩	/q/
English	⟨qu⟩	/kw/
Fijian	⟨q⟩	/ᵑɡ/
French	⟨qu⟩, ⟨q⟩	/k/
Galician	⟨qu⟩	/k/
German	⟨qu⟩	/kv/
Hadza	⟨q⟩	/ǃ/
Indonesian	⟨q⟩	/q/~/k/
Italian	⟨qu⟩	/kw/
K'iche'	⟨q⟩	/qʰ/
Khmer romanization	⟨q⟩	/ʔ/
Kiowa	⟨q⟩	/kʼ/
Kurdish	⟨q⟩	/q/
Maltese	⟨q⟩	/ʔ/
Menominee	⟨q⟩	/ʔ/
Mi'kmaq	⟨q⟩	/x/
Mohegan-Pequot	⟨q⟩	/kʷ/
Nuxalk	⟨q⟩	/qʰ/
Portuguese	⟨qu⟩	/kw/ or /k/
Sasak	⟨q⟩	/ʔ/
Somali	⟨q⟩	/q/~/ɢ/
Sotho	⟨q⟩	/ǃkʼ/
Spanish	⟨qu⟩	/k/
Swedish	⟨qv⟩	/kv/ (pre-1900 spelling, still survives in proper names)
Uzbek	⟨q⟩	/q/
Vietnamese	⟨qu⟩	/kw/
Võro	⟨q⟩	/ʔ/
Wolof	⟨q⟩	/qː/
Wu Chinese (Wugniu)	⟨q⟩	/ʔ/
Xhosa	⟨q⟩	/ǃ/
Zulu	⟨q⟩	/ǃ/

=== English ===
In English, the digraph ⟨qu⟩ most often denotes the cluster /kw/; however, in borrowings from French, it represents /k/, as in 'plaque'. See the list of English words containing Q not followed by U. Q is the second least frequently used letter in the English language (after Z), with a frequency of just 0.1% in words. Q has the fourth fewest English words where it is the first letter, after X, Z, and Y.

=== Other languages ===
In most European languages written in the Latin script, such as Romance and Germanic languages, ⟨q⟩ appears almost exclusively in the digraph ⟨qu⟩. In French, Occitan, Catalan, and Portuguese, ⟨qu⟩ represents /k/ or /kw/; in Spanish, it represents /k/. ⟨qu⟩ replaces ⟨c⟩ for /k/ before front vowels ⟨i⟩ and ⟨e⟩, since in those languages ⟨c⟩ represents a fricative or affricate before front vowels. In Spanish and Portuguese, the letter ⟨q⟩ by itself only occurs in loanwords. However, in French, ⟨q⟩ is sometimes used instead of ⟨qu⟩ at the ends of words, as in cinq or coq.

In Italian, ⟨qu⟩ represents [kw] (where [w] is the semivowel allophone of /u/), but ⟨q⟩ can be doubled, like most other consonants, as in the word soqquadro. In Albanian, Q represents /c/, as in Shqip.

Germanic languages usually use ⟨q⟩ in the digraph ⟨qu⟩, but the rules vary across languages. Of all the Germanic languages, only English and German use the initial ⟨qu⟩ in native Germanic words. Other than English, Dutch uses ⟨qu⟩ in a few Romance loans. German uses ⟨q⟩ in the digraps ⟨qu⟩, but by itself only in unassimilated loanwords and proper names. Danish, Swedish, Norwegian, Afrikaans, and Icelandic replace all cases of ⟨q⟩ with ⟨k⟩, ⟨kv⟩, or ⟨hv⟩, and reserving ⟨q(u)⟩ for unassimilated loanwords and names.

The letter is not used often or at all in other languages, being entirely absent in the Balto-Slavic and Celtic languages. The letter is not officially part of the Cornish (Standard Written Form), Estonian, (smaller) Hungarian, Icelandic, Irish, Latvian, Lithuanian, Polish, Serbo-Croatian, Scottish Gaelic, Slovenian, Turkish, or Welsh alphabets. However, in most of them, it may be found in borrowings, loanwords, technical terms, international terminology, and proper nouns.

⟨q⟩ has a wide variety of other pronunciations in some European languages and in non-European languages that have adopted the Latin alphabet.

=== Other systems ===
The International Phonetic Alphabet uses ⟨q⟩ for the voiceless uvular stop.

== Other uses ==
- The capital letter Q is used as the currency symbol for the Guatemalan quetzal.
- The Roman numeral Q is sometimes used to represent the number 500,000.

== Related characters ==
=== Descendants and related characters in the Latin alphabet ===
- Q with diacritics: ʠ Ɋ ɋ q̃
- Japanese linguistics: Small capital q (ꞯ) and modifier letter capital q (ꟴ)
- 𐞥 Modifier letter small q is used as a superscript IPA letter
- Gha: Ƣ ƣ

=== Ancestors and siblings in other alphabets ===
- 𐤒: Semitic letter Qoph, from which the following symbols originally derive:
  - Ϙ ϙ: Greek letter Koppa
    - 𐌒: Old Italic Q, which is the ancestor of modern Latin Q
    - Ԛ ԛ: Cyrillic letter Qa

=== Derived signs, symbols and abbreviations ===
- ℺: rotated capital Q, a signature mark
- Ꝗ ꝗ, Ꝙ ꝙ: Various forms of Q were used for medieval scribal abbreviations

== Other representations ==
=== Computing ===
- U+0051 Q LATIN CAPITAL LETTER Q
- U+0071 q LATIN SMALL LETTER Q
- U+FF31 Ｑ FULLWIDTH LATIN CAPITAL LETTER Q
- U+FF51 ｑ FULLWIDTH LATIN SMALL LETTER Q

=== Other ===
NATO phonetic	Morse code
Quebec	▄▄▄ ▄▄▄ ▄ ▄▄▄

Signal flag

Flag semaphore
American manual alphabet (ASL fingerspelling)
British manual alphabet (BSL fingerspelling)
Braille dots-12345
Unified English Braille

== See also ==
- List of English words containing Q not followed by U
- Mind your Ps and Qs – English idiom about minding manners
- Q factor – Resonator damping parameter
- Q# – Programming language for quantum algorithms
- QAnon – American conspiracy theory and political movement
