= Meridian Audio =

British audio and video equipment manufacturer

- Industry: Audio/Visual Consumer electronics
- Founded: 1977; 49 years ago
- Founder: Bob Stuart, Allen Boothroyd
- Headquarters: Huntingdon, England
- Products: Loudspeakers, home theatre equipment
- Website: Official website

Meridian Audio is a consumer audio and home theatre equipment manufacturer based in the United Kingdom. Bob Stuart and Allen Boothroyd founded the company in 1977 under the name Boothroyd-Stuart. In 1985 the company released a CD player under the brand name, Meridian. The company also created the lossless compression format Meridian Lossless Packing (used by DVD-Audio) in 1998 and the lossy Master Quality Authenticated (MQA) format in 2014.

== History ==
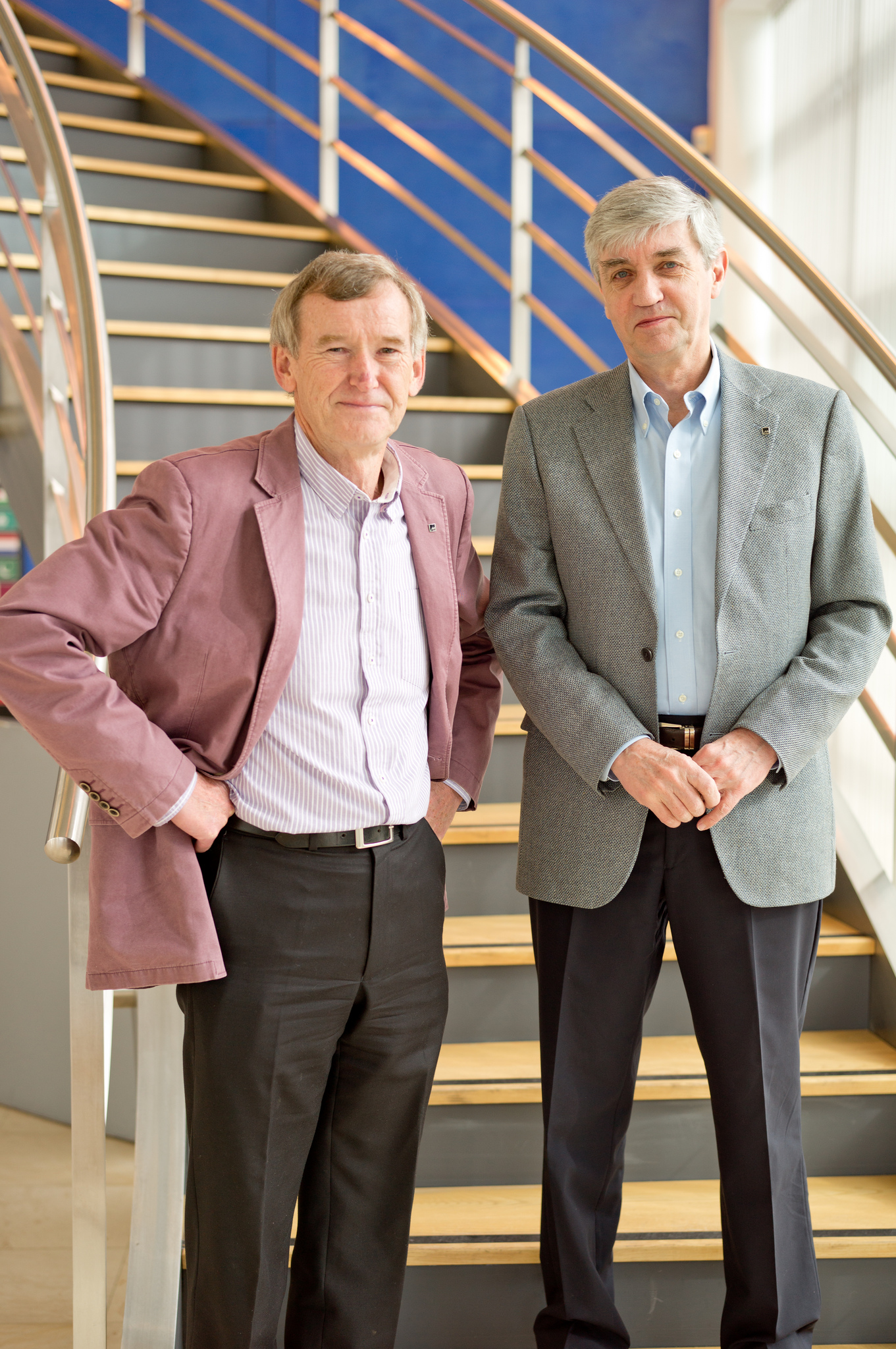
Founders Allen Boothroyd and Bob Stuart

Based in Huntingdon, Cambridgeshire, Meridian Audio was founded by John Robert (Bob) Stuart and Allen Boothroyd in 1977. Since the company's inception, all Meridian products have been built in the UK. The company claims it was among the first to introduce active loudspeakers designed for the domestic market and was the first British company to manufacture a CD player in 1983. The Meridian MCD, launched in 1985, was the first audiophile CD player.

During the pre-2007 economic boom, exports made up 80 per cent of Meridian's sales.

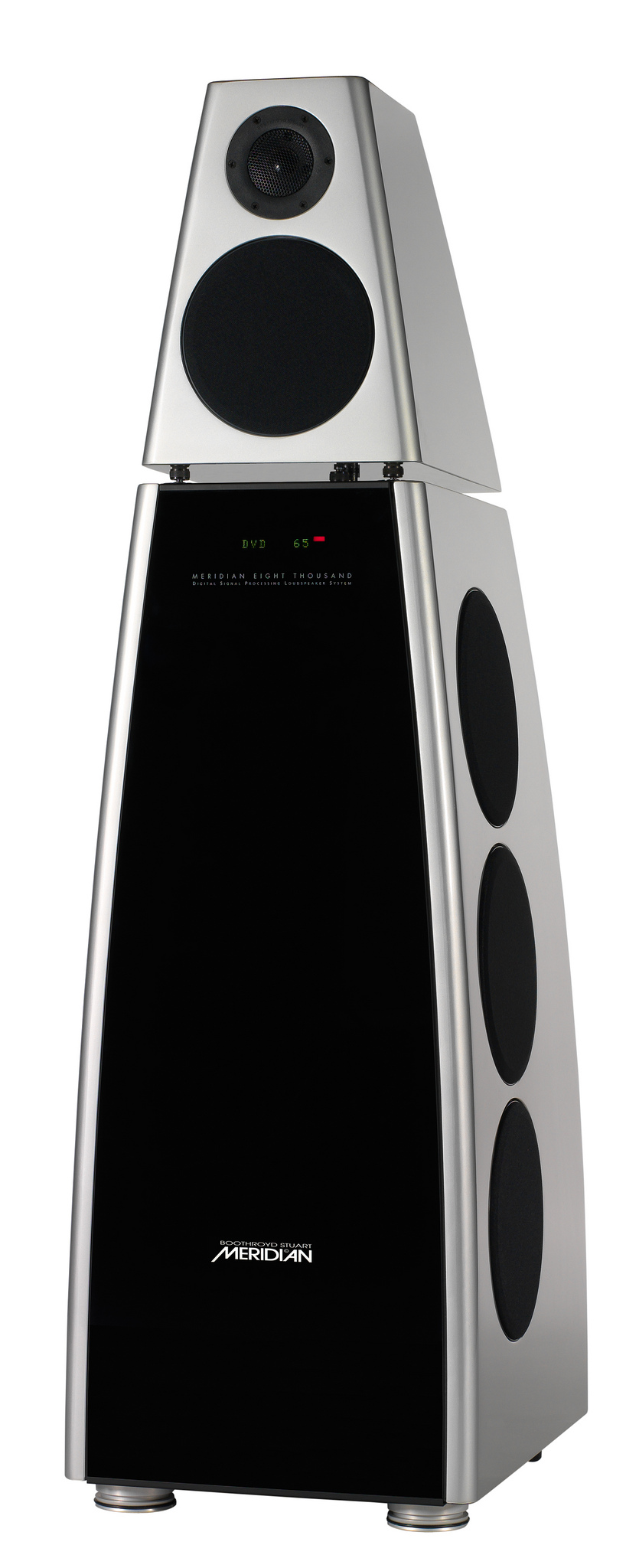
DSP8000 speakers

Following the 2008 financial crisis and subsequent recession the firm underwent three years of restructuring and experienced a 50% reduction in sales to the U.S.A. but a 10% increase in overall sales. The company also reduced its product line from 120 products to 35.

The organisation acquired the media server manufacturer Sooloos in late 2008. The acquisition gave Meridian an entry into the media server market. Following the deal, Sooloos released new products under the name Meridian Sooloos.

The company opened its first shop in Bangkok, Thailand in November 2009, followed by three more retail outlets in Seoul, Santiago and Mexico and a U.K. branch in Oxford.

In the same year, the organisation announced John Buchanan would take over from Tim Ireland as CEO.

Since 2011, Meridian has developed a relationship with Jaguar Land Rover to deliver audio products for the entire portfolio of vehicles, including a new 3D surround sound for the Range Rover 2012

Stuart resigned from the company in September 2017.

In 2019, British Airways became a Meridian customer; a set of in-flight headphones was developed that reduce resonance, distortion and reflection.

Boothroyd resigned as director in March 2020.

In 2020, the company signed up the Chinese company, Human Horizons as a customer to create a 600Watt sound system for their electric vehicle manufacturer HiPhi. The system has twelve speakers and a digital EQ controlled by AI.

In the same year, Meridian became the first audio brand to release the "Works with Sonos" integration for its zone controllers.

=== Meridian MCD, J ===
In 1984, the two founders, operating under the name Boothroyd-Stuart created a CD player under the brand name Meridian. They named the device the MCD, J. Having acknowledged that they lacked the experience or manufacturing facilities to create a CD player from scratch, Boothroyd-Stuart turned to Philips, who allowed small companies to purchase their CD-101 decks and design their own cases and interfaces. The two co-founders suspected that the mechanical parts and electronics of mass-produced CD players negated the overall sound quality. Specifically, they assumed that a lot of the sonic faults were not down to the system itself but to imperfections in the digital data extraction, the D/A conversion and the audio output circuitry and that physically stabilizing the disc in the player would eliminate digital signal vibration caused decoding errors. Therefore, they discarded the deck's analog audio circuitry and modified the unit's power supply. Especially, they sped up the deck's laser-tracking servo's focus reaction time in order to track warped discs better. They also installed a new audio board with enlarged grounding and shielding capabilities, aluminum electrolytic output coupling capacitors and a 3-pole analog filter section.

=== Ultra DAC D/A processor ===
After Stuart's departure to MQA ltd, chief technical officer, Richard Hollinshead led Meridian's design team that created a standalone digital audio converter (DAC) called the Ultra DAC. The converter uses a type of hierarchical conversion technology and has adjustable up-sampling filters.

== Awards and recognition ==
Meridian products have received several awards, including:

- 2011 Robb Report Best of the Best, Audio: Meridian Sooloos Digital Media System
- 2010 CEA Human Interface Product of the Year: Meridian Sooloos
- 2009 Robb Report Best of the Best, Home Video: Meridian 810 Reference Video System
- 2009 CEA Innovations Design and Engineering Award in the Integrated Home Systems: Meridian Sooloos
- 1988 British Design Council Award: Meridian 200 Series
- 1982 British Design Council Award: Meridian Modular Amplifier System

== Museum exhibits ==
New York's Museum of Modern Art keeps The Lecson Audio System, Boothroyd and Stuart's first sound system on permanent exhibit. London's Victoria and Albert Museum keeps the Lecson Audio System in storage.

== See also ==
- Meridian Lossless Packing, compression for DVD-Audio.
- Master Quality Authenticated, launched by Meridian Audio in 2014.
