= List of English words containing Q not followed by U =

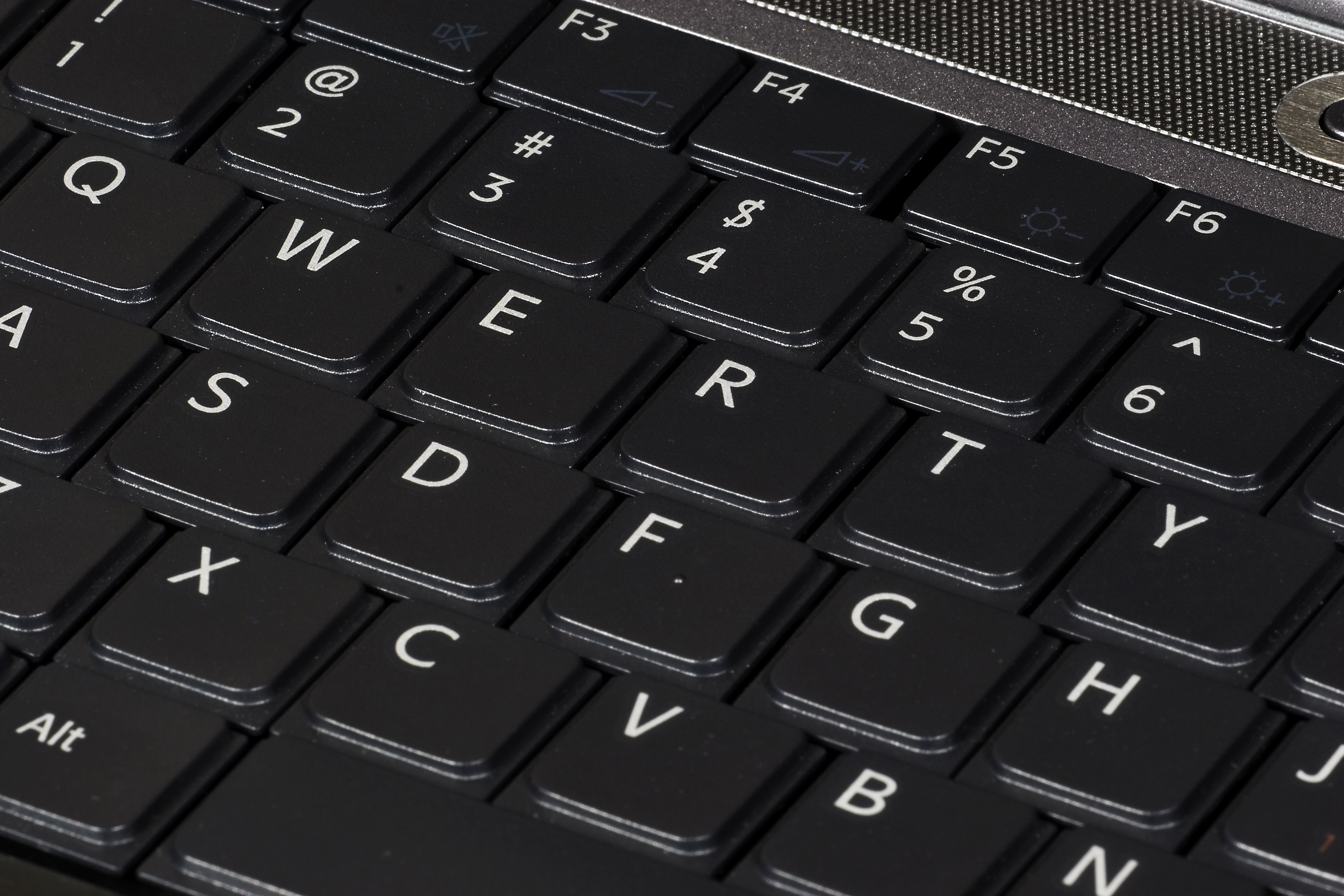
QWERTY, one of the few native English words with Q not followed by U, is derived from the first six letters of a standard keyboard layout.

In English, the letter Q is almost always followed immediately by the letter U, e.g. quiz, quarry, question, squirrel. However, there are some exceptions. The majority of these are anglicised from Arabic, Chinese, Hebrew, Inuktitut, or other languages that do not use the English alphabet, with Q often representing a sound not found in English. For example, the Chinese pinyin alphabet uses "q" to represent the sound [tɕʰ], which is approximated as [tʃ] (ch) in English, hence qi is pronounced /tʃi/ by an English speaker (similar to "cheese" without the last consonant).

In other examples, Q represents [q] in standard Arabic, such as in qat and faqir. In Arabic, the letter ق (qaf), traditionally romanised as Q, is quite distinct from ك (kaf), traditionally romanised as K; for example, قلب [qalb] means 'heart' but كلب [kalb] means 'dog'. However, alternative spellings are sometimes accepted, which use K (or sometimes C) in place of Q; for example, Koran (Qur'ān) and Cairo (al-Qāhira).

Of the words in this list, most are (or can be) interpreted as nouns, and most would generally be considered loanwords. However, all of the loanwords on this list are considered to be naturalised in English according to at least one major dictionary (see § List of dictionaries cited), often because they refer to concepts or societal roles that do not have an accurate equivalent in English. For words to appear here, they must appear in their own entry in a dictionary; words that occur only as part of a longer phrase are not included.

Proper nouns are not included in the list, including many names, places, and companies, as these can be created arbitrarily.

== Words ==
Unless noted otherwise, all words listed here are assumed to be pluralized by adding -s or -es. References in the "Sources" column relate to the headword in column one; variant spellings are then separately referenced. The sources given are selective, and the absence of a reference to a particular dictionary does not necessarily mean that the word does not appear in that dictionary.

words
Word	Meaning	Sources	Other forms	Etymology
bianqing	An ancient Chinese percussion instrument	^{[MW]}		Chinese: 編磬
buqsha	A former Yemeni monetary unit	^{[L]}	Also written bogache	Arabic
burqa	A veiled garment worn by some Muslim women	^{[ODE]} ^{[LC]} ^{[C]} ^{[AHC]} ^{[OED]}	Also written burka, burkha, or burqua	Urdu and Persian burqa, from Arabic burqu`
cinq	The number five, as signified in dice or cards	^{[ODE]} ^{[COD]} ^{[OED]}		French cinq 'five'
cinqfoil	A plant of the genus Potentilla, or an ornamental design thereof	^{[SOED]} ^{[OED]}	Much more commonly written cinquefoil	Middle English, from Latin quinquefolium, from quinque 'five' + folium 'leaf'
coq	A trimming of cock feathers on a woman's hat	^{[WI]}		French coq 'cockerel'
Esq.	Postnominal honorific given to lawyers, knights, and certain members of the British landed gentry.	^{[MW]}	Abbreviation of Esquire Also written Esqr.	Middle English, from Old French esquier, originally Latin scutarius.
faqih	An Islamic jurisprudent	^{[RHW]}	Plural faqihs or fuqaha ^{[RHU]}	Arabic فَقِيه
faqir	A Muslim ascetic	^{[L]}	More commonly written fakir	Arabic فَقِير 'poverty-stricken'
fiqh	Muslim jurisprudence	^{[ODE]}		Arabic فِقْه 'understanding'
inqilab	A revolution in India or Pakistan	^{[C]}		Arabic إِنْقِلَاب
mbaqanga	A style of South African music	^{[ODE]} ^{[C]} ^{[W]}		Zulu umbaqanga 'steamed maize bread'
miqra	The Tanakh, or Hebrew text of the Bible	^{[WI]}		Hebrew מקרא
muqaddam	A Bangladeshi or Punjabi headman	^{[C]}		Arabic مُقَدَّم
nastaliq	An Arabic script used in Persian writings	^{[OED]}	Also written nasta'liq ^{[C]}, nestaliq ^{[OED]}, nastaleeq, or shortened to just taliq ^{[OED]}	Persian نستعليق, from naskh + ta`liq
niqab	A veil for the lower-face worn by some Muslim women	^{[ODE]}	Also written niqaab	Arabic from نِقَاب
pontacq	A sweet wine from Pontacq (France)	^{[OED]}		French
q	Q or q, the 17th letter of the modern English alphabet	^{[MW]}		Greek or Latin
qabab	A dish consisting of pieces of seasoned meat	^{[OED]}	More commonly written kebab, kebap, kebob, kibob, kebhav, kephav, kebabie, or kabob	Persian کباب
qabalah	A form of Jewish mysticism	^{[C]} ^{[AHC]} ^{[WI]}	More commonly written Kabbalah, and also written Qabala ^{[AHC]}, Qabbala ^{[WI]}, Cabalah etc. Derived words include qabalism, qabalist, and qabalistic.	Hebrew קַבָּלָה
qadariyah	In Islam, adherents of the doctrine of free will	^{[RHU]}	Also written Qadariya ^{[RHU]}	Arabic
qaddish	In Judaism, a prayer of mourning	^{[C]}	More commonly written Kaddish	Hebrew קדיש
qadi	A Muslim judge	^{[L]} ^{[C]} ^{[W]} ^{[OED]} ^{[AOX]}	Also written qadhi ^{[OED]}, qaadi, kadi, kazi qaadee or qazi ^{[OED]}	Arabic قَاضِى
qadiriyah	In Islam, a Sufi order	^{[RHU]}	Also written Qadiriya ^{[RHU]}	Arabic القَادِرِيَّة
qaf	ق, the twenty-first letter of the Arabic alphabet	^{[RHW]}	Also written qaph or qap	Arabic قَاف
qaid	A Muslim tribal chief	^{[RHW]}	Also written caid or kaid	Arabic قَائِد, 'leader', 'commander'
qaimaqam	A minor official of the Ottoman Empire	^{[C]} ^{[OED]}	Also written kaymakam, kaimakam, caimacam, or qaim makam	Arabic from قَائِم 'standing' + مَقَام 'place', meaning 'standing in place'
qalamdan	A Persian writing-case	^{[C]}		Persian قلمدان
qalandar	A member of an order of mendicant dervishes	^{[RHU]}	Also written calender, or capitalised	
qanat	A type of water-supply tunnel found in north Africa and the Middle East	^{[ODE]} ^{[C]} ^{[OED]} ^{[AOX]}	Also written kanat, khanat, kunut, kona, konait, ghanat, or ghundat	Persian, from Arabic qanāt 'channel'
qanun	A type of harp	^{[OED]}	Also written qanon or kanun ^{[OED]}	Arabic قَانُون, rule, principle or mode
qantar	Certain units of weight used in Mediterranean countries.	^{[WI]}	Also written kantar or cantar	Arabic qinṭār, from Late Greek kentēnarion weight of 100 pounds, from Late Latin centenarium
q'ari	The 27th letter of the three Georgian scripts.	Note: This is not English	Also written Qar	Asomtavruli: Ⴗ; Nuskhuri: ⴗ; Mkhedruli: ყ; Mtavruli: Ყ; Georgian: ყარი, ყარ
qāriʾ	A person who recites the Quran with the proper rules of recitation (tajwid).	Note: This is not English	Also written qari; feminine form: qāriʾa	Arabic: قَارِئ, lit. 'reader', plural قُرَّاء qurrāʾ or قَرَأَة
qasida	An Arabian poem of praise or satire	^{[C]} ^{[OED]} ^{[AOX]}	Also written qasidah	Arabic قَصِيدَة
qat	A kind of Arabian shrub used as a narcotic	^{[L]} ^{[C]} ^{[OED]}	More commonly written khat, kat or gat	Arabic قات qāt
qawwal	A person who practices qawwali music	^{[ODE]} ^{[C]} ^{[AOX]}		
qawwali	Devotional music of the Sufis	^{[ODE]} ^{[C]} ^{[AOX]}		Arabic قوَّالِي (qawwāli) 'loquacious' or 'singer'
qere	A marginal reading in the Hebrew Bible	^{[OED]} ^{[WI]}	Also written qeri ^{[WI]} or qre ^{[WI]}	Aramaic קְרֵי, '[what is] read'
qhat	An obsolete spelling of what	^{[OED]}		Likely of Scots origin, in which an older spelling convention used "quh-" or "qh-" where English had "wh-".
qheche	An obsolete spelling of which	^{[OED]}		Likely of Scots origin, in which an older spelling convention used "quh-" or "qh-" where English had "wh-".
qhom	An obsolete spelling of whom	^{[OED]}		Likely of Scots origin, in which an older spelling convention used "quh-" or "qh-" where English had "wh-".
qhythsontyd	An obsolete spelling of Whitsuntide (the day of Pentecost)	^{[OED]}		Likely of Scots origin, in which an older spelling convention used "quh-" or "qh-" where English had "wh-".
qi	In Chinese culture, a physical life force	^{[ODE]} ^{[C]} ^{[AHC]} ^{[OED]}	Commonly written chi or ki	simplified Chinese: 气; traditional Chinese: 氣
qiana	A type of nylon	^{[OED]}		Originally a trademark of DuPont, now generic
qibla	The point to which Muslims turn in prayer	^{[ODE]} ^{[COD]} ^{[C]} ^{[OED]} ^{[AOX]}	Also written qiblah ^{[OED]}, kiblah, qiblih, kibla or qib'lah ^{[RHU]}, sometimes capitalised	17th-century Arabic for 'the opposite'
qibli	A local Libyan name for the sirocco, a southeasterly Mediterranean wind	^{[OED]}	Also written ghibli	Arabic قِبلي, "coming from the qibla
qid	Four times a day	^{[MW]}		Latin quater in die
qigong	A Chinese system of medical exercises	^{[ODE]} ^{[C]} ^{[AOX]}	Also written chi gong, ki gong, or chi kung	simplified Chinese: 气功; traditional Chinese: 氣功
qin	A classification of Chinese musical instruments	^{[AOX]}		Chinese: 琴
qinah	A Hebrew elegy	^{[WI]}	Also written kinah; plural kinnot, qinot, qinoth and qindarkë	Hebrew קינה
qindar	An Albanian unit of currency, equal to one one-hundredth of a lek	^{[ODE]} ^{[L]} ^{[C]}	Plural qindarka ^{[L]} or qindars ^{[C]}. Also written qintar ^{[L]} ^{[C]} ^{[AOX]} or quintal	Albanian
qing	A Chinese chime	^{[MW]}	Also written as: ch'ing	Chinese: 磬
qinghaosu	A drug, artemisinin, used to treat malaria	^{[C]}		Chinese: 青蒿素
qinter	An Albanian money system	^{[OED]}		Albanian
qipao	A traditional Chinese dress	^{[OED]}	Also written chi pao	Chinese: 旗袍
qiran	A currency of Iran between 1825 and 1932	^{[MW]}	Also written as: kran	Persian qrān
qirsh	A monetary unit of Saudi Arabia and, formerly, various other countries	^{[RHU]}	Also written qurush, qursh, gursh, girsh or ghirsh	Arabic
qiviut	The wool of the musk-ox	^{[OED]}		Inuktitut ᕿᕕᐅᖅ
qiyas	An analogy in Sharia, Islamic law	^{[RHW]}		Arabic قِيَاس
qoph	The nineteenth letter of the Hebrew alphabet	^{[L]} ^{[C]}	Also written koph	Hebrew קוף
qorma	A type of curry	^{[Co]}	Much more commonly written korma	Persian→Urdu قورمه
qwerty	A standard English keyboard layout	^{[ODE]} ^{[COD]} ^{[LC]} ^{[C]} ^{[AOX]} ^{[OED]}	Plural qwertys or qwerties; also rendered QWERTY	Named after the first letters on the top row of the QWERTY keyboard layout.
rencq	An obsolete spelling of rank	^{[OED]}		Scots
sambuq	A type of dhow, a small Arabian boat	^{[OED]}		Arabic سَنْبُوك
seq	Abbreviation of sequence or sequitur depending on context	^{[OED]}	Also written as seq. Plural written as seqq	Middle English, Latin, and Legalese
sheqel	A unit of weight originally used in Mesopotamia. The modern currency of Israel, divided into 100 agorot	^{[MW]}	Plural sheqels or sheqalim; more commonly written shekel	Hebrew שקל, Yiddish ניי-שקל
souq	An Arab marketplace	^{[ODE]} ^{[C]} ^{[OED]} ^{[AOX]}	Also written sooq, soq, suq, souk, esouk, or suk	Arabic سُوق (sūq)
talaq	A form of Islamic divorce	^{[ODE]} ^{[C]} ^{[OED]}		Arabic طَلَاق (talāq), from talaqa 'repudiate'
taluq	An Indian estate	^{[OED]}	Also written taluk or talook	Arabic→Urdu تَعَلُّقَة (ta'alluqa) 'connection', 'relationship'
taluqdar	A person who collects the revenues of a taluq	^{[OED]}	Also written talukdar or talookdar	Arabic→Urdu تعلقدار (ta'alluq-dar) 'landholder', 'possessor of an estate', 'lord of a manor'
taluqdari	An Indian landholding tenure	^{[OED]}		
taqiya	Concealing faith in Islam due to fear of persecution	^{[RHW]}	Also written taqiyah ^{[RHU]}, or capitalised	Arabic التَقِيَّة
taqlid	Acceptance of Muslim orthodoxy	^{[RHW]}		Arabic تَقْلِيد
tariqa	A Sufi method of spiritual development, or a Sufi missionary	^{[E]} ^{[AOX]}	Also written tariqat ^{[E]} or tarika	Arabic طَرِيق
tranq	Tranquilizer (sedative)	^{[OED]}	Also written trank ^{[OED]}	Apocopation from tranquilizer
tsaddiq	In Judaism, a title for a righteous person	^{[C]} ^{[OED]}	Plural tsaddiqs or tsaddiqim; also written tzaddiq ^{[C]}, tzadik or tzaddik	Hebrew צדיק
umiaq	An open Inuit boat	^{[OSPD4]}	Also spelled umiak, umialak, umiac, oomiac or oomiak	Inuit
waqf	A charitable trust in Islamic law	^{[ODE]} ^{[C]} ^{[OED]}	Also written wakf; plural waqf ^{[ODE]} ^{[C]} ^{[OED]} or waqfs ^{[C]} ^{[OED]}	Arabic, literally 'stoppage' from waqafa, 'come to a standstill'
yangqin	A trapezoidal Chinese hammered dulcimer	^{[C]}		Chinese: 揚琴
yaqona	A Fijian intoxicating beverage, kava	^{[C]} ^{[OED]}		Fijian yaqona, in which q represents [ŋɡ]

== List of dictionaries cited ==
- [MW]: Merriam-Webster's Collegiate Dictionary (11 ed.). Merriam-Webster. 2003. ISBN 0-87779-809-5.
- [L]: The Longman Dictionary of the English Language (5 ed.). Longman. 1988. ISBN 0-582-55511-6.
- [ODE]: Oxford Dictionary of English (2 ed.). Oxford UP. 2003. ISBN 0-19-861347-4.
- [LC]: The Longman Dictionary of Contemporary English (4 ed.). Longman. 2003. ISBN 0-582-77649-X.
- [C]: The Chambers Dictionary (9 ed.). Chambers. 2003. ISBN 0-550-10105-5.
- [Co]: Collins English Dictionary (3 ed.). HarperCollins. 1994. ISBN 0-00-470678-1.
- [COD]: Concise Oxford Dictionary (8 ed.). Clarendon. 1990. ISBN 0-19-861200-1.
- [E]: "Microsoft Encarta online dictionary". Archived from the original on November 2, 2009.
- [AHC]: American Heritage College Dictionary (4 ed.). Houghton Mifflin. 2007. ISBN 978-0-618-83595-9.
- [AOX]: "Ask Oxford". Archived from the original on June 23, 2011.
- [OED]: Oxford English Dictionary. Oxford UP. 2003. ISBN 0-19-861347-4.
- [OSPD4]: The Official Scrabble Players Dictionary (4 ed.). Merriam-Webster. 2005. ISBN 0-87779-929-6.
- [RHU]: Random House Unabridged Dictionary (2 ed.). Random House. 1998. ISBN 0-517-19931-9.
- [RHW]: Random House Webster's Unabridged Dictionary (2 ed.). Random House. 2005. ISBN 0-375-42599-3.
- [SOED]: The Shorter Oxford English Dictionary on Historical Principles (3 ed.). Clarendon. 1992. ISBN 0-19-861294-X.
- [TWL]: Official Tournament and Club Word List (2 ed.). Merriam-Webster. 2006. ISBN 0-87779-635-1.
- [W]: Random House Webster's Collegiate Dictionary. Random House Reference. 2000. ISBN 0-375-42560-8.
- [WI]: Webster's Third New International Dictionary, Unabridged. Merriam-Webster. 2002. ISBN 0-87779-201-1.

== See also ==
- Constrained writing
- English words without vowels

== Bibliography ==
- Eckler, A. Ross (1976). "Must You Join the Queue?". Word Ways. 9 (2): 113–115. Archived from the original on August 2, 2010.
- Quinion, Michael (2003). "Q followed by U". World Wide Words. Archived from the original on October 7, 2010.
- Quinion, Michael (2009). Why is Q Always Followed by U? Word-perfect Answers to the Most-asked Questions about Language. Penguin Books. ISBN 978-1-84614-184-3. Archived from the original on October 9, 2010.
- Scrabble Word Lists Q without U – Parker Brothers, attributed to: Joe Edley; John D. Williams, Jr. (2009). "Chapter 6: Your Fourth-Grade Teacher, Mrs. Kleinfelder, Lied to you: You Can Have Words with a Q and No U". Everything Scrabble: Third Edition. Simon and Schuster. pp. 56–58. ISBN 978-1-4165-6175-0.
