= Acorn System 1 =

Early 8-bit microcomputer

Acorn Microcomputer
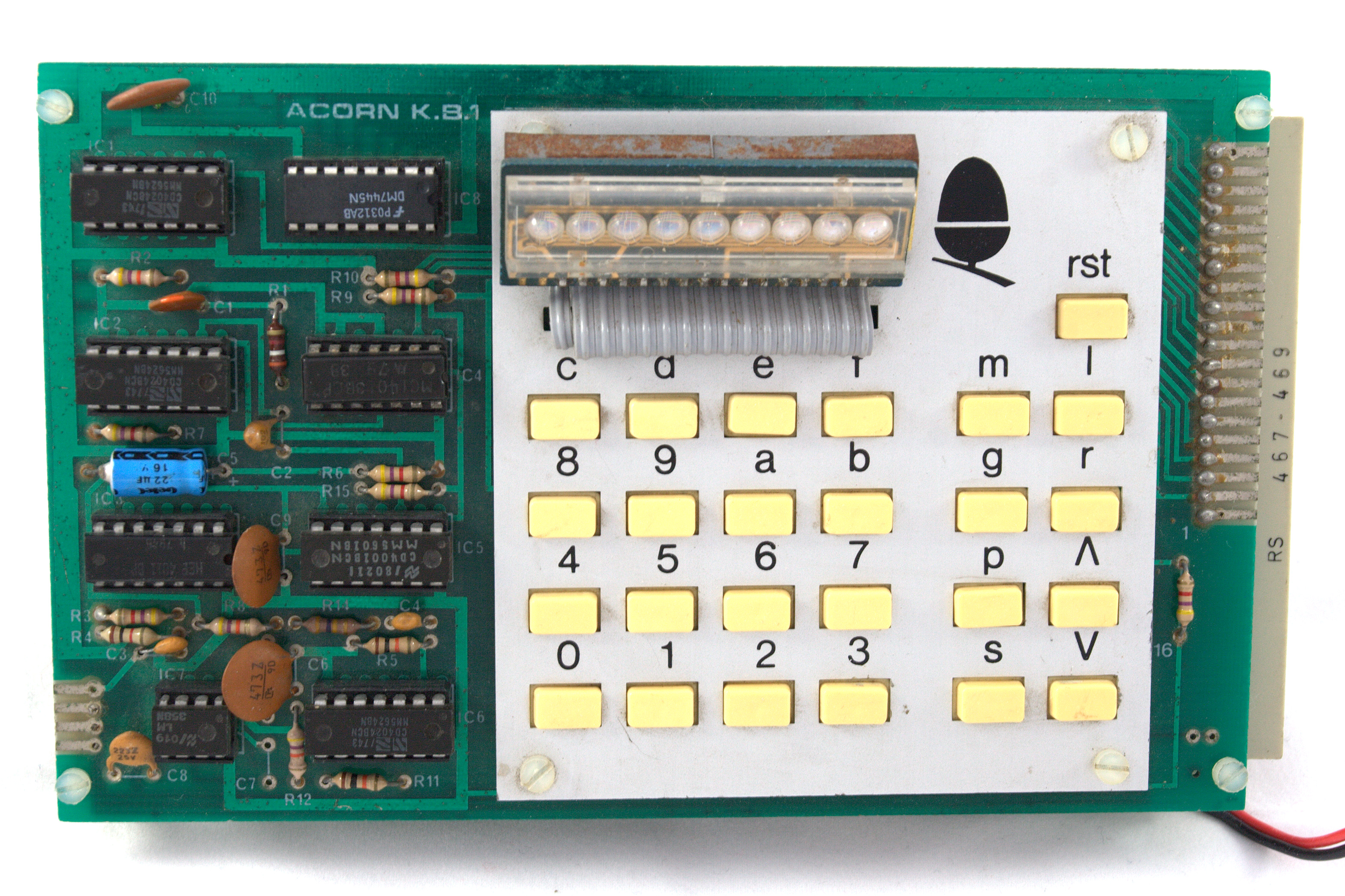
- Upper board, featuring keypad and LED display
- Developer: Acorn Computers
- Type: 8-bit semi-professional
- Released: March 1979; 47 years ago
- Introductory price: £65 (kit), £75 (assembled)
- CPU: 6502 @ 1MHz
- Memory: 1152 bytes
- Storage: CUTS cassette tape interface
- Display: LED
- Graphics: -
- Sound: -
- Input: 25-key keypad
- Controller input: -
- Connectivity: INS8154 RAMIO Expansion chip (optional), CUTS cassette tape interface, socket for optional additional ROM/EPROM
- Power: 7.5V+ from external PSU through onboard 5V regulator
- Dimensions: 160 x 100mm two stacked boards
- Successor: Acorn System 2, Acorn Atom

The Acorn System 1, initially called the Acorn Microcomputer (Micro-Computer), was an early 8-bit microcomputer for hobbyists, based on the MOS 6502 CPU, and produced by British company Acorn Computers from 1979.

The main parts of the system were designed by then-Cambridge-undergraduate student Sophie Wilson, with a cassette interface designed by Steve Furber. It was Acorn's first product, and was based on an automated cow feeder.

It was a small machine built on two Eurocard-standard circuit boards and it could be purchased ready-built or in kit form.

- one card (shown right) with the I/O part of the computer: a LED seven segment display, a 25-key keypad (hex+function keys), and a cassette CUTS interface (the circuitry to the left of the keypad)
- the second card (the computer board - see below), which included the CPU, RAM/ROM memory, and support chips
- the two boards were interconnected by a semi-flexible, multi-conductor cable, known by its commercial name 'Spectra Strip'
- the whole assembly was held together by four 2.5mm × 20mm nylon screws and clear plastic spacing tubes for rigidity.

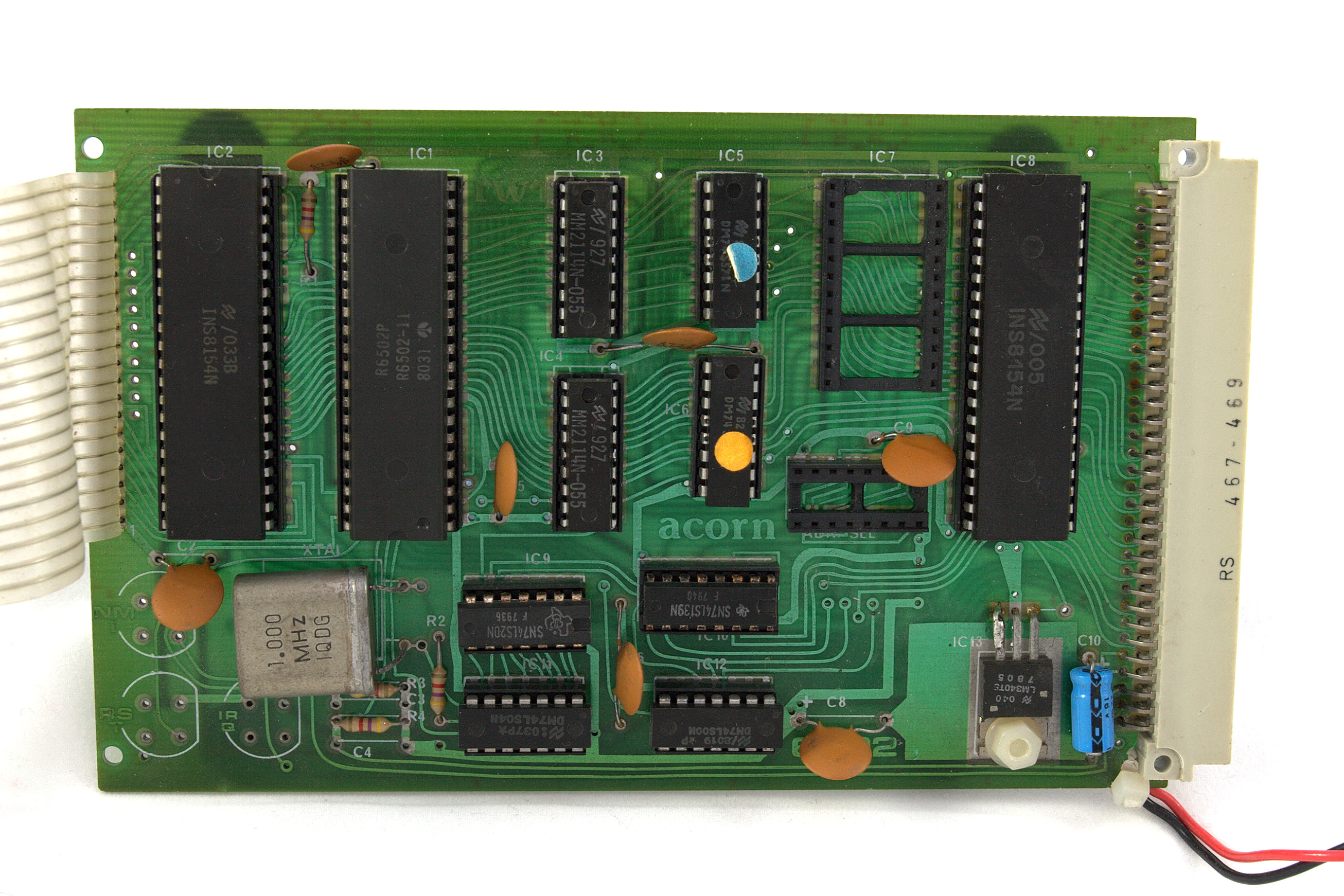
Acorn System 1 Rear (CPU) Board

Main Components (left to right)

- Top Row: INS8154 RAMIO Integrated Circuit (for keyboard and display), 6502 CPU, 2 × 2114 1024×4 RAM, 2 × 74S571 512×4 PROM, RAM/ROM expansion socket, second INS8154 for peripheral expansion (optional extra with the kit version).
- Bottom row: 1 MHz clock crystal, 4 × TTL logic chips providing address decoding for the memory and I/O expansion, 5V regulator.
- The smaller empty socket in the middle of the board was used to set the memory map of the RAM, ROM and I/O expansion by fitting or soldering wires between various positions according to the instructions in the Acorn System 1 Technical Manual.
- The three semi-circular legends on the bottom left of the board marked positions for optional push switches to trigger the board's RESET, IRQ (Interrupt ReQuest) and NMI (Non Maskable Interrupt) lines.

Almost all CPU signals were accessible via the standard Eurocard connector on the right-hand side of the board. This connector was not fitted/supplied as standard with the kit version.

The System 1 front board was used as the control panel for the fictional computer Slave in the 1981 series of the BBC science-fiction series Blake's 7.

== See also ==
- Acorn System 2
- Acorn System 3
- Acorn System 4
- Acorn System 5
- Acorn Atom
