= David Johnson-Davies =

Computer scientist and journalist

- Born: London, England
- Occupation: Computer scientist
- Children: 3

David Johnson-Davies is a British computer scientist and journalist, known for his contributions to the field of computing.

Born in London, he studied experimental psychology in Cambridge and later joined Acorn Computers. As the founder and managing director of Acornsoft, he published video games and business software. After leaving Acornsoft in 1986, he established Human Computer Interface, which developed Macintosh-based programs compatible with BBC BASIC and BBC Micro software. Johnson-Davies contributed articles to Acorn User and created Identifont, a website that identifies typefaces from samples. He also developed Fontscape and Fontifier.

== Early life and education ==
Johnson-Davies was born in London and has three children.

He studied experimental psychology in Cambridge (where he currently resides), and became a researcher at the Medical Research Council Applied Psychology Unit (now the MRC Cognition and Brain Sciences Unit).

== Career ==
In 1980, Johnson-Davies completed a PhD and then went on to join Acorn Computers, developers of the BBC Micro. Johnson-Davies was the founder and managing director of Acornsoft, publisher of video games such as Elite and the View business software range by Mark Colton.

In 1982, Johnson-Davies wrote Practical Programs for the BBC Computer and Acorn Atom.

In 1986, he left Acornsoft and established Human Computer Interface shortly afterwards. The company developed Macintosh-based programs compatible with BBC BASIC and BBC Micro software, disks, and networks, including for Hitachi and Royal Mail.

Johnson-Davies also contributed several articles to Acorn User. In May 1986, he discussed the graphical potential of Benoit Mandelbrot’s mathematics in "Join the Mandelbrot Set". In July 1986, Johnson-Davies applied the Newton-Raphson method for finding the roots of an equation to create images that display fractal behavior, featured in "Back to the Roots." In the October 1986 issue, he wrote "Spider Power" alongside quantum computing pioneer David Deutsch.

In 2000 he created Identifont, a website which identifies typefaces from provided samples.

Johnson-Davies then went on to develop Fontscape (copyrighted in 2000).
