= Identifont =

- Founded: November 2000; 25 years ago
- Founder: David Johnson-Davies
- Headquarters: Cambridge, England, United Kingdom
- Website: www.identifont.com

The Identifont web site is an online directory of typefaces, with main function a tool to help identify a font from a sample. It has been described as the largest Internet directory of typefaces.

Identifont may be used to find a font similar to a given one. It also allows potential purchasers to make comparisons of typeface specifications.

Identifont has an index of years from 1470 to 2026 and describes the most popular font of each year.

== History ==
The site was launched in 2000, and was designed by computer scientist David Johnson-Davies based on AI techniques. Research on its application by graphic design students was published in 2006.

== Identification technique ==
The site enables the user to identify typefaces by walking through a series of questions. The principle of identification is to use distinctive features of given letters, and the site returns the designer and manufacturer of the font, as well as the name. Technically it is an application of the Common Lisp Hypermedia Server. The service was used as licensed technology on Fonts.com and linotype.com.

The same principles have been applied to Japanese typefaces.
