= Acorn System =

Series of modular microcomputer systems

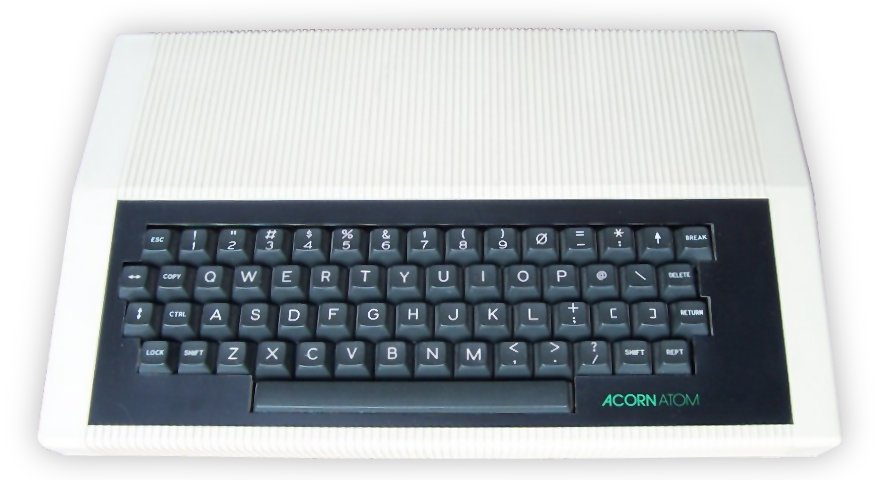
- System 2 - the keyboard design also served as the case for the Acorn Atom
- Developer: Acorn Computers
- Type: microcomputer
- Released: 1979; 47 years ago
- Discontinued: c. 1984

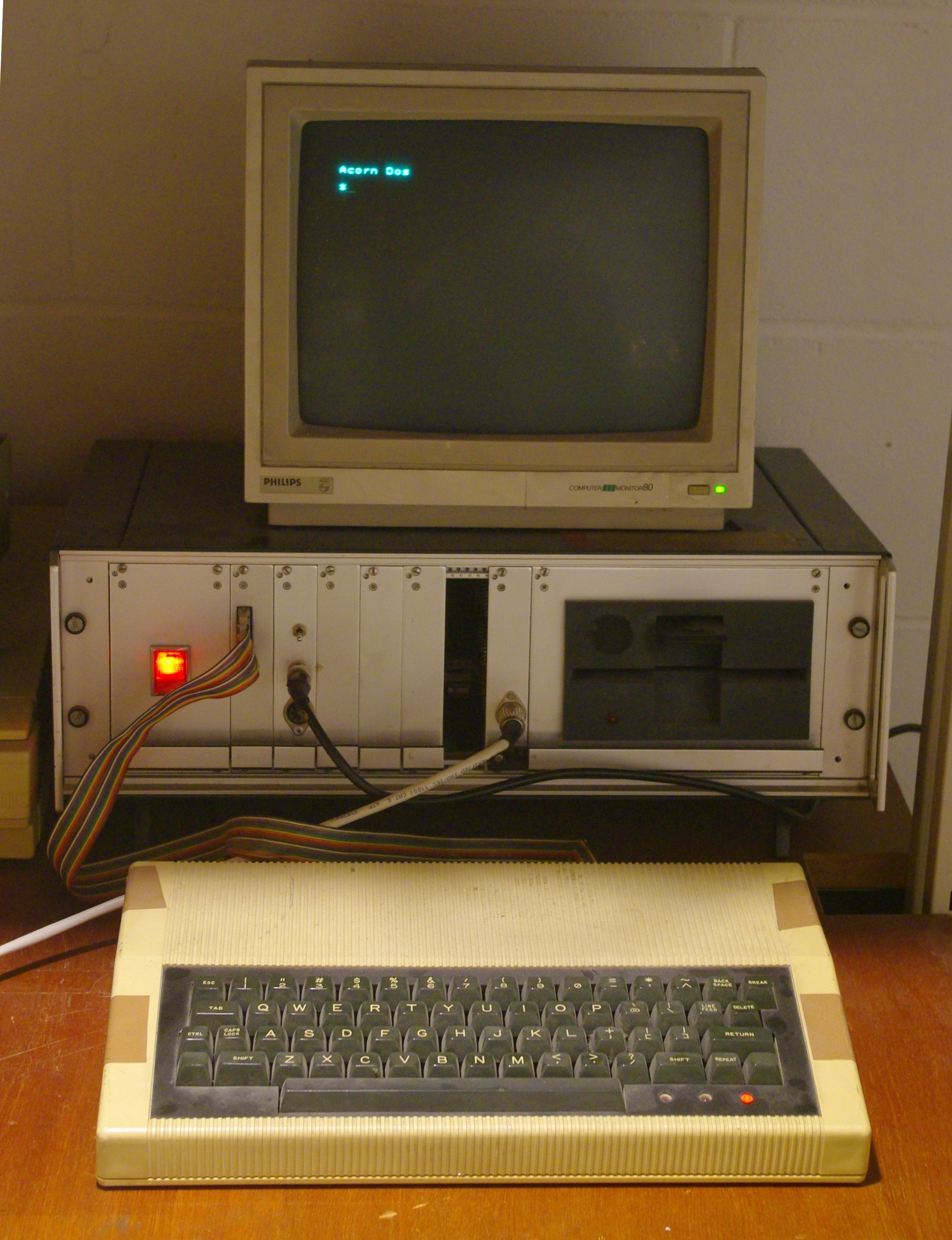
Acorn System 3 computer equipped with (from left) a 6502 CPU card, a 40-column VDU card, three memory cards, an Econet card, and a floppy disc drive.

The Acorn System was a series of modular microcomputer systems based on rack-mounted Eurocards developed by Acorn Computers from 1979 to 1982, aimed primarily at industrial and laboratory use, but also home enthusiasts.

The experience gained in developing this modular system strongly influenced the design of Acorn's first all-in-one home computer, the Acorn Atom, released in March 1980; and also much of the circuitry in its successor, the BBC Micro, first shown in late 1981.

Acorn's final rack-based machine was the System 5, released in late 1982. The Eurocard business was then sold on to one of its principal resellers, Control Universal Ltd, which continued to develop various cards for industrial use based on the Acorn-standard bus during the 1980s, but ultimately went into receivership in 1989.

== Eurocards ==
Placing the two Eurocards from the original Acorn Microcomputer onto a backplane made the system straightforward to expand in a modular way. The original I/O card, minus its keypad and LED display, became the cassette interface card; while the original 6502 CPU card, slightly adapted with the addition of a keyboard interface, became the basic CPU card of the system.

A series of interchangeable expansion cards were then developed: additional RAM cards; a card containing the Acorn System BASIC interpreter on ROM; a 40×25 character VDU card, and a UHF adaptor for it; interface cards; a floppy disk controller; Econet network cards; an 80×25 character VDU card; and later also alternate processor cards, offering a 6809 or a faster 6502.

== System 1 ==
The Acorn System 1, initially called the Acorn Microcomputer (Micro-Computer), was intended for hobbyists. It was based on the MOS 6502 CPU, and produced by British company Acorn Computers from 1979. It was a small machine built on two Eurocard-standard circuit boards and it could be purchased ready-built or in kit form.

== System 2 ==
The Acorn System 2 was offered as a system by Acorn Computers from 1980. It was the successor to the Acorn Microcomputer (renamed the Acorn System 1).

The system comprised four Eurocard-sized printed circuit boards mounted in a 19 inch sub-rack frame on an 8-slot backplane, plus a (separately supplied) additional external keyboard. The four PCB cards contained respectively:

- a CPU card, containing a 1 MHz 6502 microprocessor, the keyboard interface, and a 2K ROM with the cassette operating system (The 6502 card could be swapped for a 6809.)
- a VDU card, providing a 40×25 character teletext-standard display, based on an MC6845 CRT controller and an SAA5050 teletext character generator,
- a cassette interface card,
- a memory card with 4K of RAM and a 4K BASIC ROM. A further 4K of RAM could be added, and also an additional 4K ROM containing floating-point routines and scientific functions.

The CPU card and cassette interface card were the same cards as used the System 1, but with the keypad and LED display of the latter left unused. The system could be expanded with any of Acorn's standard Eurocards to add further functionality. In 1982 it was being offered for £320, or £480 with power supply, plus an additional £136 for the optional keyboard.

== System 3 ==
The Acorn System 3 added a floppy disk controller card, floppy disk drive, and disk operating system ROM, replacing the cassette interface card and cassette operating system of the System 2 machine.

The System 3 became the standard workhorse for development in the Acorn lab: the Acorn Atom has been called a cut-down version of the System 3; and it was based on the System 3 that much of the development work for the BBC Micro was done.

A minimum configuration contained:

- A CPU card
- A 40×25 Teletext-standard VDU card
- 8K RAM with 4K BASIC ROM
- A floppy disk controller
- One 100K floppy disk drive

In 1982 this was being offered for £775, or £1075 with power supply, casing, and two further 8K RAM cards; plus, again, an additional £136 for a keyboard.

== System 4 ==
The Acorn System 4 was similar to the System 3, but in a double height frame, containing fourteen slots in the lower frame, and two floppy disk drives in the upper half of the frame above them. With casing, power supply, and a basic 16K of RAM it was being offered for £1525 in 1982 (again, plus extra for the keyboard).

== System 5 ==
The Acorn System 5 was the final Acorn rack-mounted system, released in 1983. It was mounted in an extra-height single 19-inch frame, which could accommodate two vertically mounted 5 1/4-inch floppy drives, with either seven or ten Eurocard slots. It came complete with a power supply, and was only available fully assembled. As standard it had a 1 MHz 6502, 32K DRAM, a disk controller, and either the 80×25 or the Teletext 40×25 VDU cards. Customers could choose which cards to install in the remaining slots, including interface cards, an additional 16K DRAM card, and/or an Econet network adapter; they could also choose to upgrade the processor board to a faster 2 MHz 6502 board.
