= Aemulor =

Emulator of ARM microprocessors

- Original author: Adrian Lees
- Release: March 2003
- Stable release: 2.51
- Operating system: RISC OS
- Type: Emulator
- License: Proprietary commercial software
- Website: sendiri.co.uk/aemulor/

In computing, Aemulor is an emulator of the earlier 26-bit addressing-mode ARM microprocessors. It runs on ARM processors under 32-bit addressing-mode versions of RISC OS. It was written by Adrian Lees and released in 2003. An enhanced version is available under the name Aemulor Pro.

The software allows Raspberry Pi, Iyonix PC and A9home computers running RISC OS to make use of some software written for older hardware. As of 2012, compatibility with the BeagleBoard single-board computer was under development.

== Development ==
The software's existence was first reported around the time of the announcement of the Iyonix in October 2002. A demo version was released in February 2003, with the commercial release in March of that year.

Aemulor Pro was released in 2004. This added enhancements, including support for low colour modes, required by scorewriter Sibelius and many games. A version for the A9home was released in 2005. The software was exhibited at the 2006 Wakefield Show.

In 2009, author Adrian Lees posted on The Icon Bar, showing an early prototype of the software running on the BeagleBoard. Progress on further compatibility for the Raspberry Pi single-board computer was announced by Lees on the RISC OS Open forum in 2012. Developer R-Comp was reported in May 2012 to be hoping to make Aemulor available for its BeagleBoard-xM-based ARMini computer.

== Features ==
Sibelius running on the Iyonix

The software provides full 26-bit emulation for applications written in C and ARM assembly language. It employs an XScale-optimised ARM code interpreter, supports SWI emulation from RISC OS 4 to 5, flag preservation and creation of dynamic areas in low memory. Support for running A310Emu is included, allowing users to further emulate earlier versions of the OS, going back to Arthur. As of 2003, due to the memory remapping employed, native 32-bit applications are restricted to a maximum size of 28Mb while Aemulor is running.

The original release included an Easter egg, with a prize of an upgrade to the Pro version for the person who found it.

Aemulor Pro adds support for low-bpp screen modes, sound, hardware emulation of VIDC/IOC, an altered memory map and 26-bit filing systems. Some software, such as Sibelius, can be run both in the desktop and in full screen.

=== Compatible software ===
Title	Purpose	Vendor/publisher
ArtWorks	vector graphics	MW Software
Impression	desktop publishing	Computer Concepts
PipeDream 3	spreadsheet	Colton Software
Sibelius	scorewriter	Sibelius Software
Spheres of Chaos.	video game	
StrongED	text editor	
Zap	text editor	
