= Icon bar =

Operating system element

In computing, the icon bar is the name of the dock in Acorn's RISC OS operating system, and is fundamental to the OS. Its introduction in 1987 (as part of Arthur, the predecessor to RISC OS) was a new concept in GUIs. It displays icons through which access is provided to all parts of the computer that a typical user will require, from physical devices and system utilities to running applications, and will usually be their starting point for interacting with the system once it has finished booting.

== Appearance and features ==
The bar is fixed in height and located at the bottom of the screen. It takes up the full width of the screen, and a single row of icons is displayed within. Icons are either justified to the left or the right edge of the screen, at the control of the owning program. According to Acorn's official RISC OS Style Guide, a program should place its icons to the left hand side of the icon bar if they relate to physical devices or resources such as filing systems. These will have an item of text underneath them identifying the device or resource. All other icons should be placed on the right of the bar. If too many icons are present to be displayed at once then the icon bar will extend horizontally and become wider than the screen; in order to access the non-visible icons the user must scroll the bar by hovering the mouse pointer at the appropriate edge of the screen.

The result of clicking the left mouse button (known as the Select button) on an icon will vary depending on what the icon represents. For filing systems, a filer window will open containing the contents of the root directory. For document-oriented applications supporting multiple open documents, clicking Select will open a window containing a new, empty document. This is different from the behaviour of the typical Taskbar and Dock, where clicking an icon will result in a task switch (All windows associated with the icon will be brought to the front of the window stack and will gain input focus). For programs that do not support multiple open documents, clicking its icon will typically result in the task switch behaviour.

By pressing the middle (Menu) mouse button while the pointer is over an icon, a context-sensitive menu associated with that icon will open. Although the owner of the icon is responsible for the contents of the menu, the menus for icons with similar functions will typically contain the same subset of options. For example, filing systems will allow the naming and formatting of disks, as well as an option to open a window displaying free space. Most applications will provide access to an Info window (displaying the version number and copyright information), online help, and a quit option.

Drag and Drop, Filer Icons (File or Directory) can be dragged and dropped on top of an icon bar icon to initiate a process, if the object type is known to the application. For example:

- Copying a file or directory to the root of a floppy or network drive
- Adding a file or directory to a compressed archive
- Opening a text file in a word-processor
- Playing a music file or video
- Deleting a file by placing it in the waste bin

Even if there are no running applications or active filing systems, the icon bar will contain a small number of system-managed icons:

- The Apps icon, located within the left-hand group of icons. This was introduced in RISC OS 3 as a way to access the applications built into the computer's ROM. It is actually just a frontend to the read-only ResourceFS filing system; when the icon is clicked it opens the Resources:$.Apps folder. Although ResourceFS is read-only via the usual filing system interface, system APIs can be used to add or replace files. In RISC OS 3.5 this functionality was leveraged to allow the user to easily add his own applications to the Apps folder, via the AddApp star command. The applications inserted using AddApp are simple shell applications that will just execute the real, original copy of the application when they are started. This allows the applications to be added without using significant amounts of RAM and restricting them to read-only access to their internal files.
- The Task Manager icon, located to the far right of the icon bar. When clicked with the left mouse button this opens a window similar to that of the Windows Task Manager, where the running programs and processes are listed, along with their memory usage. Basic control over the processes is also available (forced termination and in some cases manual control over how much memory is allocated). From the task manager's icon bar menu it is also possible to shut down the computer, exit the window manager to the single-tasking CLI, or open a multi-tasking CLI window. A desktop boot file can also be saved, which contains the current state of the desktop and any loaded programs. In theory this provides full hibernation support, although in reality because each program is responsible for saving and restoring its state within the file, the computer's state after executing the saved boot file will not be identical to its state before.
- The Display Manager icon is located just to the left of the task manager. This allows selection of which display mode is in use. In versions of RISC OS prior to 3.5, where memory restrictions forced most people to use modes with 16 or less colours, it was also possible to alter the current palette from this icon.

In RISC OS 3 the AddTinyDir star command was introduced, which allows an icon for any file, folder or application to be added to the left-hand side of the icon bar. This provides functionality similar to that later embodied in the Mac OS X dock.

== History and evolution ==
=== Arthur ===
The Arthur icon bar, 1987

Appearance after a typical unmodified system boot

The icon bar first appeared in the Arthur operating system, in 1987. To the right was an Exit icon, which provided an exit to the command line (later to be replaced by the Task Manager). In keeping with the operating system as a whole, the icon bar reflected the multicolour appearance, being orange in colour

=== RISC OS 2 ===
The RISC OS 2 icon bar, 1988

Appearance after a typical unmodified system boot

RISC OS 2 in 1988 introduced the Task Manager and Display icons, with the Task Manager adopting Acorn's Archimedes logo. The colour scheme was also revised and a suite of applications supplied on floppy disk. Amongst these was one called 'TinyDirs', which allowed users to dock applications and directories on the icon bar for convenient access.

=== RISC OS 3 ===
The RISC OS 3 icon bar, 1991

Appearance after a typical unmodified system boot

RISC OS 3 in 1991 introduced the Apps icon to the left and replaced the Task Manager's Archimedes logo with the Acorn nut. Apps provided access to the ROM based applications and the functionality of 'TinyDirs' was replaced by the OS command AddTinyDir. The 'Shift-F12' keyboard shortcut and icon grouping were also added, with the intention of simplifying the finding of desired icons. The whole of RISC OS, including the icon bar, was given a facelift in 1993 including replacement of the flat grey colour with a textured wallpaper. This was referred to as the 3D "Look and Feel". In 1994, this 3D look was provided as standard with the release of RISC OS 3.5 on the Risc PC series. The "nested Wimp" introduced in 1998 (as a soft load for existing machines) added the feature to temporarily bring the icon bar to the front of the window stack by moving the pointer to the bottom of the screen (previously this required 'Shift-F12' on the keyboard).

=== RISC OS 4 ===
The RISC OS 4 icon bar, 1999

Appearance after launching a number of devices and applications

RISC OS 4 in 1999 introduced the facility for iconised windows to be sent to the icon bar rather than the Pinboard. The facelift introduced in RISC OS 3.5 was also incorporated directly into the OS, as well as the method of popping the icon bar to the front. The Task Manager icon was again replaced, this time with the RISC OS 4 cube logo used by RISCOS Ltd. Later versions of RISC OS 4 replaced the Task Manager's cube with the cogwheel, designed by Richard Hallas.

=== RISC OS 5 ===
The RISC OS 5 icon bar, 2002

Appearance after a typical unmodified system boot

Appearance after launching a number of devices and applications

RISC OS 5 in 2002 introduced further changes in icon design, including the Iyonix 'blue jellybean' Task Manager icon, again designed by Richard Hallas.

=== RISC OS 6 ===
RISC OS 6 in 2006 introduced the number 6 in the centre of the Task Manager's cogwheel icon. Where appropriate, Adjust (right mouse button) clicks perform consistent operations such as loading the configuration choices for parts of the system.
