= A9home =

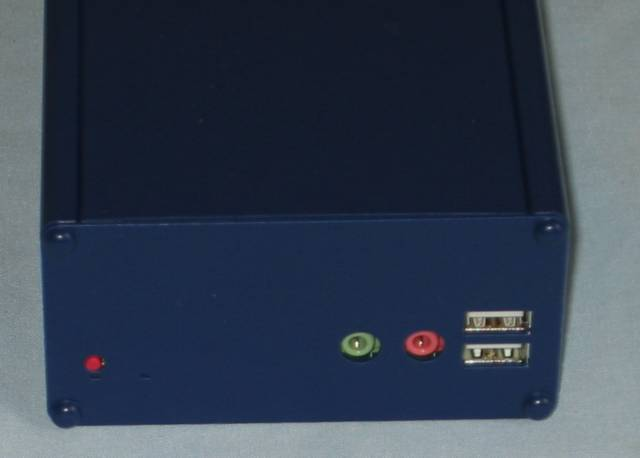
- A9home front, showing power button, speaker sockets and USB ports
- Developer: Advantage Six
- Manufacturer: Simtec Electronics
- Released: May 2006
- Operating system: RISC OS
- CPU: Samsung S3C2440, ARM920T, ARMv4
- Memory: 128 MB SDRAM, 8 MB VRAM
- Storage: 40 GB hard disk
- Predecessor: Risc PC, Iyonix PC
- Successor: Touch Book, ARMini

The A9home was a niche small-form-factor desktop computer running RISC OS Adjust32. It was officially unveiled at the 2005 Wakefield Show, and is the second commercial ARM-based RISC OS computer to run a 32-bit version of RISC OS. When the Iyonix PC was withdrawn from sale, the A9home remained the only hardware to be manufactured specifically for the RISC OS marketplace.

== Details ==
The A9home was smaller than the Mac Mini and housed in cobalt-blue aluminium casing, measuring 168 mm × 103 mm × 53 mm in size. The machine runs on a 400 MHz Samsung ARM9 processor, has 128 MB SDRAM of main memory and 8 MB VRAM and houses an internal hard disk of 40 GB. On the front, it features two USB 1.1 ports, a microphone and a headphones socket. On the rear, it has two USB 1.1 ports, two PS/2 ports, 10/100 BaseT network port, a RS-232 serial port and a power connection socket. Like the Mac Mini of 2009 and earlier, it is powered by an external PSU (5 V, 20 W). Furthermore, it has a power/reset switch, a status/health indicator and a drive activity indicator LED. The A9home is not designed to be internally expanded.

The A9home could use a program called Aemulor to emulate older 26-bit applications. This was originally developed for Castle's Iyonix PC.

In April 2006, Advantage Six Ltd announced that they were focussing on connectivity in the run-up to that year's Wakefield Show. At the show, they demonstrated integrated Bluetooth. Although the A9home was officially released for purchase by end users, its custom version of RISC OS 4 remained unfinished. As of 2013, RISCOS Ltd closed after failing to release any information in 2012 about when or if the OS will become feature complete.

== History ==
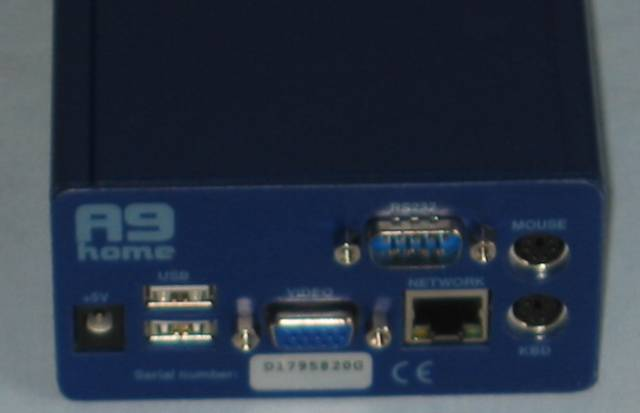
Rear view, showing connectors

In 2004, RISCOS Ltd privately began work on a version of RISC OS that supported 32-bit addressing modes found on later ARM architectures, RISC OS Adjust (Adjust 32), which is compatible with current ARM processors and designed for both embedded and desktop forms. The first, and so far only, machine to make use of the 32-bit version of the OS is the Advantage6 A9home. It was released in May 2006 after a 12-month Beta testing process, although the current build of Adjust 32, namely RISC OS 4.42, is a prerelease and no final version of the OS has yet been released. It was intended to be the first in a series of machines, with others running Linux.

Both 26- and 32-bit builds of new RISC OS 4 releases can now be compiled from the same source code, but will have to be modified to run on each individual machine supported, as the OS has no HAL at present. Instead it has a hardware-abstracted kernel, which allows specific code to be substituted for each platform supported.

== Other configurations ==
The A9home was the retail version of the A9, for OEM customers was the A9 also available in a half-width single rack unit (1U) rack mountable ruggedised case, "A9RM" and as a wall/bulkhead-mountable unit with integral 8.4 in (21 cm) TFT touchscreen, GPS and GSM/GPRS, "A9Loc". These were marketed from about 2004 through 2009.
