= MakeModes =

Software to enable display on different monitors

- Developer: Acorn Computers
- Release: 22 August 1994
- Operating system: RISC OS
- Platform: RiscPC, Acorn clones
- License: Proprietary commercial software

In computing, MakeModes is an application which is used to generate data which allows RISC OS computers to produce display output compatible with various computer monitors. It can generate and modify data which is used by the operating system to produce different graphics display resolutions.

== Development ==
MakeModes was released in 1994, for use with the RiscPC (initially running RISC OS 3.5). The documentation was revised for clarity by Frank Watkinson in 2003. The issuing of this revised documentation was supported by RISCOS Ltd.

== Features ==
MakeModes assists in mode setting, via the editing and creation of monitor definition files (MDFs). It can be used to define screen modes suited to particular monitors.
