= NCOS =

- Developer: Acorn Computers, Pace
- Working state: Discontinued
- Available in: English
- Supported platforms: ARM
- Default user interface: RISC OS
- License: Proprietary

NCOS is the graphical user interface-based operating system developed for use in Oracle Corporation's Network Computers, which are discontinued. It was adapted by Acorn Computers from its own RISC OS, which was originally developed for their range of Archimedes desktop computers. It shares with RISC OS the same 4 MB ROM size and suitability for use with TV displays.

In 1999, Pace acquired the set-top box (STB) division of Acorn Computers, this being a component in the disposal of assets around the takeover of Acorn by MSDW Investment Holdings. This gave Pace the rights to use and develop NCOS. RISCOS Ltd later announced Embedded RISC OS, which was to have similarities with NCOS.

== Development ==
NCOS originated in connection with the Network Computer project. It was used on various STB products. It branched from RISC OS 3.60 and was called RISC OS 3.61 before being named after Network Computer Operating System. It was merged back into the HEAD whilst at Pace, where it was known as RISC OS-NC and RO-STB.

=== Features ===
NCOS was designed in accord with the Network Computer Reference Profile and thus supports internet standards of the time. Being closely based on RISC OS, it can also run many of that operating system's applications. Reporting on the launch of the Network Computer in 1996, it was noted that NCOS was essentially the same as RISC OS but with some features removed, such as "support for local file systems", whereas other features such as network support had been added to ROM. The actual differences involved the absence of "modules significant to the operation and networking" of existing RISC OS versions, including the Filer, TaskManager and Pinboard modules, plus a range of networking modules. The use of files stored on a server and accessed using the Network File System (NFS) also imposed restrictions on the files used by applications, with recommended techniques for the deployment of applications involving the transfer of files over NFS from RISC OS clients or the use of archives in the largely Acorn-specific Spark format, with these being unpacked on the server using an appropriate tool.

== See also ==
- Network operating system
- RISC OS character set
