= Chip dumping =

Chip dumping may refer to:

- An act of collusion in online betting - see Glossary of poker terms
- Taking a copy of the contents of a memory chip - see ROM image
- Dumping (pricing policy) chips (i.e. integrated circuits such as memory chips or processors) into a market, at an apparently uneconomic price
