= Bus-Tops =

Bus-Tops was a project for the 2012 Cultural Olympiad, part of the Artists Taking The Lead project funded by Arts Council England and in collaboration with LOCOG.

Bus-Tops saw a series of 30 red LED screens situated on the roofs of bus stops in 20 London boroughs displaying art work made by both the public and established artists. The screens were powered by BeagleBoards running custom software and 3G connections to receive art content and upload sensor-based information. The installations were fed art content via the project's website where anyone could upload artwork to be considered for inclusion on a screen.

The project was scheduled to end at the end of the Olympic period, 30 September 2012.
