= Star Fighter (video game) =

1994 video game

- Developers: Fednet, Krisalis, Acclaim Entertainment
- Platforms: Acorn Archimedes, PC, PlayStation, Sega Saturn, 3DO
- Release: Acorn Archimedes; 1994; 3DO; 1995; PC; October 8th, 1996; PlayStation; 1996; Sega Saturn; 1996
- Genre: Space simulation
- Mode: Single-player

Star Fighter or Star Fighter 3000 is a 3D flight-based shoot-em-up developed and published by UK company Fednet Software, and released in 1994 for the Acorn Archimedes. The gameplay is mission based and involves elements of strategy and planning. The player can order wingmen to fly in formation and attack specific targets.

== RISC OS ==
=== Acorn Archimedes ===
Gameplay screenshot of the Acorn Archimedes version

Star Fighter 3000 was first released for the Acorn Archimedes in November 1994 by Fednet Software, a company created by Tim Parry and Andrew Hutchings to publish the game. Earlier games the pair developed were Chocks Away and Stunt Racer 2000, which were published by The Fourth Dimension. One element of the gameplay noted in the game's review was the ability for the player to fly the fighter out of the planet's atmosphere, with the sky darkening until "outer space begins to appear", also providing encounters with "hostile emplacements in orbit".

Version 3.20, of this branch of the game, was released in January 2016. Later versions improve compatibility across RISC OS machines and are free to any owner of a previous release.

=== Microdigital Omega ===
In 2002, a second branch for RISC OS was developed for newer machines. It was a back-port of the 3DO code. Development was done under the software label FlaYmz; headed by Nathan Atkinson (formerly of Visions of the Impossible) and coded by Lee Noar. Paul Thomson (VOTI and DFI) and Lee Johnston (VOTI) worked on the new introduction. The conversion was extremely difficult because little paperwork was available to explain how the 3DO handled some of the graphics routines. Lee Noar had the difficult task unpicking this code. This version featured the graphical and gameplay enhancements of the 3DO version.

FlaYmz worked with MicroDigital to produce a killer game for release of the Omega computer, showing off the power of a dedicated graphics card in a RISC OS computer. The port was developed on StrongARM RISC PCs which, for most of the development, were too slow to run the game at a decent fps. However, the deal fell through when MicroDigital started showing financial difficulties. Optimisations were done to the code to make it playable on the StrongARM. Later, in April 2008, this version was made available for through RiscWorld magazine, the full version being bundled free with Volume 8, Issue 6. FlaYmz had no involvement in the release in 2008, having disbanded shortly after Microdigital failed due to the market decline.

== 3DO ==
The 3DO version was developed by Tim Parry and Andrew Hutchings. It was developed after the original Acorn version was released. This version is slightly different from the original RISC OS game. The map screen is in 3D, not 2D as in the Acorn RISC OS version. Also, to upgrade the ship the player must collect a series of 3D shapes after blowing up certain objects. In the Acorn RISC OS version, the player collects and spends money on ship upgrades. Another difference is that the player can blast pathways through mountain ranges with the laser.

== PC, PlayStation and Saturn ==
Star Fighter 3000 was also released for the PC, Sony PlayStation and Sega Saturn in North America by Acclaim Entertainment and in Europe by Telstar. These versions were ports of the 3DO version. Unlike the original Acorn version and 3DO version, Tim Parry and Andrew Hutchings had no involvement in their development.

These versions make heavy use of distance fog to significantly decrease the draw distance. Detail levels on the buildings, texture mapped ground, and other objects were also decreased.

== Reception ==
Reception

Review scores
Publication	Score
AllGame	4.5/5 (3DO); 3/5 (SAT)
Electronic Gaming Monthly	8.125/10 (3DO)
GameSpot	4.4/10 (PC)
Next Generation	4/5 (3DO); 3/5 (PS1); 2/5 (SAT)
Maximum	2/5 (3DO)
Sega Saturn Magazine	72% (SAT)
Power Unlimited	77% (3DO)

Reviews for the 3DO version varied widely. Electronic Gaming Monthly criticized the controls for being too loose but praised the huge number of missions, the addictive gameplay, and most of all the ability to fly freely in any direction. GamePro summarized that "Star Fighter doesn't quite soar with the eagles, but it doesn't flop with the turkeys, either." They noted the ability to fly in any direction and the large number of missions as positive elements, and the slow game speed, undetailed graphics, and pronounced pop up as negative elements. A reviewer for Next Generation also found the game uneven and cited the large number of missions, slow game speed, and "ridiculous" pop up. However, he additionally commented that the ability to deform the landscape with weapons fire is fun, and that "enemy installations tend to be designed as if someone were really trying to defend themselves". Maximum panned it for its "dreadful control system", pronounced slowdown, and grating music, as well as the simplicity of the early missions. They did praise the game's visuals, but concluded that "when inevitably compared to Air Combat, this ultimately fails to present a credible alternative." Power Unlimited gave the 3DO version a score of 77% writing: "The sceneries are very nice and the handling of the ship is fine."

Reviewing the Saturn version, Rob Allsetter of Sega Saturn Magazine said that while the game is technically proficient, the controls are oversensitive, the graphics blocky, and the action so lacking in variety that it soon becomes predictable and dull. He added, "As a shoot 'em up it lacks pace and easy accessibility to make it great, and as a flight sim it lacks depth. As a result, Starfighter 3000 floats about tepidly in between." Next Generation's brief reviews of the Saturn and PlayStation versions opined that they were not bad, but somewhat lackluster.

Stephen Poole of GameSpot gave the PC version a 4.4 out of 10, saying that flight simulators are much better suited for PC than console, and as a straight conversion of a 3DO game, Star Fighter retains the shortcomings of its console origins. He especially criticised the poor graphics, story and controls.

In 1996, GamesMaster ranked the 3DO version 4th on their "The GamesMaster 3DO Top 10."

== Space Fighter 4000 ==
In 2011, Andrew Hutchings entered a new game, inspired by Star Fighter, in the 2011 'Dream Build Play' contest. Written for the XNA platform, it was released for Xbox 360 and Windows PC.
