= RISC OS character set =

Character set was used in the Acorn Archimedes series

The Acorn RISC OS character set was used in the Acorn Archimedes series and subsequent computers from 1987 onwards. It is an extension of ISO/IEC 8859-1, similar to the Windows CP1252 in that many of the added characters are typographical punctuation marks.

== Code page layout (standard) ==
At 0x83 is a box with another box inside it on the top left-hand corner, meaning "resize window". At 0x84 is a 'bubble-writing' X, meaning "close window". At 0x87 is an unusual character that is a subscript 8 followed by a superscript 7. It is not proposed for Unicode. At 0x88, 0x89, 0x8A, and 0x8B are left, right, up, and down bubble arrows for window scrollbars.

The following table shows the RISC OS character set. Each character is shown with a potential Unicode equivalent in the tooltip.

RISC OS character set
	0	1	2	3	4	5	6	7	8	9	A	B	C	D	E	F
0x	NUL	SOH	STX	ETX	EOT	ENQ	ACK	BEL	BS	HT	LF	VT	FF	CR	SO	SI
1x	DLE	DC1	DC2	DC3	DC4	NAK	SYN	ETB	CAN	EM	SUB	ESC	FS	GS	RS	US
2x	SP	!	"	#	$	%	&	'	(	)	*	+	,	-	.	/
3x	0	1	2	3	4	5	6	7	8	9	:	;	<	=	>	?
4x	@	A	B	C	D	E	F	G	H	I	J	K	L	M	N	O
5x	P	Q	R	S	T	U	V	W	X	Y	Z	[	\	]		_
6x	`	a	b	c	d	e	f	g	h	i	j	k	l	m	n	o
7x	p	q	r	s	t	u	v	w	x	y	z	{	|	}	~	DEL
8x	€	Ŵ	ŵ	◰	🯀	Ŷ	ŷ	_{8}^{7}	⇦	⇨	⇩	⇧	…	™	‰	•
9x	‘	’	‹	›	“	”	„	–	—	−	Œ	œ	†	‡	ﬁ	ﬂ
Ax	SP	¡	¢	£	¤	¥	¦	§	¨	©	ª	«	¬	SHY	®	¯
Bx	°	±	²	³	´	µ	¶	·	¸	¹	º	»	¼	½	¾	¿
Cx	À	Á	Â	Ã	Ä	Å	Æ	Ç	È	É	Ê	Ë	Ì	Í	Î	Ï
Dx	Ð	Ñ	Ò	Ó	Ô	Õ	Ö	×	Ø	Ù	Ú	Û	Ü	Ý	Þ	ß
Ex	à	á	â	ã	ä	å	æ	ç	è	é	ê	ë	ì	í	î	ï
Fx	ð	ñ	ò	ó	ô	õ	ö	÷	ø	ù	ú	û	ü	ý	þ	ÿ

Differences from ISO/IEC 8859-1

== Code page layout (Electronic Font Foundry 1.1) ==
The Homerton font, a clone of Helvetica, does not have these characters. EFF, a third-party supplier of RISC OS outline fonts, has a different, but similar character set. This RISC OS Latin-1 character set was used by Electronic Font Foundry.

RISC OS EFF character set
	0	1	2	3	4	5	6	7	8	9	A	B	C	D	E	F
0x	NUL	SOH	STX	ETX	EOT	ENQ	ACK	BEL	BS	HT	LF	VT	FF	CR	SO	SI
1x	DLE	DC1	DC2	DC3	DC4	NAK	SYN	ETB	CAN	EM	SUB	ESC	FS	GS	RS	US
2x	SP	!	"	#	$	%	&	'	(	)	*	+	,	-	.	/
3x	0	1	2	3	4	5	6	7	8	9	:	;	<	=	>	?
4x	@	A	B	C	D	E	F	G	H	I	J	K	L	M	N	O
5x	P	Q	R	S	T	U	V	W	X	Y	Z	[	\	]		_
6x	`	a	b	c	d	e	f	g	h	i	j	k	l	m	n	o
7x	p	q	r	s	t	u	v	w	x	y	z	{	|	}	~	DEL
8x	Ŵ	Ŷ	Ẃ	İ	ŵ	ŷ	ẃ	…	€	⁴	™	ı	/	ƒ	‰	•
9x	‘	’	‹	›	“	”	„	–	—	−	Œ	œ	†	‡	ﬁ	ﬂ
Ax	NBSP	¡	¢	£	¤	¥	¦	§	¨	©	ª	«	¬	SHY	®	¯
Bx	°	±	²	³	´	µ	¶	·	¸	¹	º	»	¼	½	¾	¿
Cx	À	Á	Â	Ã	Ä	Å	Æ	Ç	È	É	Ê	Ë	Ì	Í	Î	Ï
Dx	Ð	Ñ	Ò	Ó	Ô	Õ	Ö	×	Ø	Ù	Ú	Û	Ü	Ý	Þ	ß
Ex	à	á	â	ã	ä	å	æ	ç	è	é	ê	ë	ì	í	î	ï
Fx	ð	ñ	ò	ó	ô	õ	ö	÷	ø	ù	ú	û	ü	ý	þ	ÿ

Differences from RISC OS

== Code page layout (TRC) ==
TRC character set
	0	1	2	3	4	5	6	7	8	9	A	B	C	D	E	F
0x	NUL	SOH	STX	ETX	EOT	ENQ	ACK	BEL	BS	HT	LF	VT	FF	CR	SO	SI
1x	DLE	DC1	DC2	DC3	DC4	NAK	SYN	ETB	CAN	EM	SUB	ESC	FS	GS	RS	US
2x	SP	!	"	#	$	%	&	'	(	)	*	+	,	-	.	/
3x	0	1	2	3	4	5	6	7	8	9	:	;	<	=	>	?
4x	@	A	B	C	D	E	F	G	H	I	J	K	L	M	N	O
5x	P	Q	R	S	T	U	V	W	X	Y	Z	[	\	]		_
6x	`	a	b	c	d	e	f	g	h	i	j	k	l	m	n	o
7x	p	q	r	s	t	u	v	w	x	y	z	{	|	}	~	DEL
8x	α	←→	Ẃ	İ	ŵ	ŷ	ẃ	…	€	⁴	™	ı	/	ƒ	‰	•
9x	‘	’	‹	›	“	”	„	–	—	−	Œ	œ	†	‡	ﬁ	ﬂ
Ax	NBSP	¡	¢	£	¤	¥	¦	§	¨	©	ª	«	¬	SHY	®	¯
Bx	°	±	²	³	´	µ	¶	·	¸	¹	º	»	¼	½	¾	¿
Cx	À	Á	Â	Ã	Ä	Å	Æ	Ç	È	É	Ê	Ë	Ì	Í	Î	Ï
Dx	Ð	Ñ	Ò	Ó	Ô	Õ	Ö	×	Ø	Ù	Ú	Û	Ü	Ý	Þ	ß
Ex	à	á	â	ã	ä	å	æ	ç	è	é	ê	ë	ì	í	î	ï
Fx	ð	ñ	ò	ó	ô	õ	ö	÷	ø	ù	ú	û	ü	ý	þ	ÿ

Differences from ISO/IEC 8859-1
