= The Electronic Font Foundry =

Software companies of the United Kingdom

- Industry: Computer software
- Founded: UK (1984)
- Founder: Edward Detyna
- Headquarters: Ascot, Berkshire, UK
- Area served: Worldwide
- Key people: Edward Detyna, Kevin Simpson, Aaron Timbrell
- Products: Computer fonts
- Website: thefonts.com at the Wayback Machine (archived October 19, 2015)

The Electronic Font Foundry (EFF) was a business engaged in the design and sale of computer fonts. It was established in 1984 by Polish physicist Dr Edward Detyna, in the United Kingdom. They tailored and produced fonts in PostScript, TrueType and RISC OS formats. It produced fonts in more than 60 languages.

EFF produced high quality RISC OS versions of many popular fonts and typefaces, as well as a large collection of exclusive designs.

EFF RISC OS fonts were the first (besides those produced by Acorn Computers) to contain kerning data. Dr Detyna was instrumental in the inclusion of several advanced typographical features into later versions of RISC OS. He designed the MetaFont, used internally by Acorn, EFF and other font foundries to generate fonts for less common Latin and Cyrillic character sets.

The company's public domain RISC OS CD-ROM, released in 1997, includes conversions of public domain fonts to the RISC OS format. It also includes a cataloguing tool.

== Font Families ==
The EFF has produced many different fonts within many font families;

- IcePick
- Fancy Dress
- Autograph
- AutographS
- Remington
- Adrian
- Courier
- NewSwiss
- Utamura
- Venice
- Sans Serif CC (for TV)

== Released Text ==
Outline Fonts For RISC-OS released in 1993. Was a user manual for those using RISC-OS with the intentions of understanding fonts.
