= ArtWorks =

Software package

- Original author(s): Computer Concepts
- Developer(s): MW Software
- Stable release: 2.X3.00 / October 27, 2017; 7 years ago
- Written in: ARM assembler, C, C++
- Operating system: RISC OS
- Type: Vector graphics editor
- License: Proprietary
- Website: www.mw-software.com

ArtWorks is an advanced vector drawing package for RISC OS created by Computer Concepts (now Xara) in 1991. It has been developed by MW Software since 1996. Xara has continued to develop a Windows version called Xara Photo & Graphic Designer.

== Release history ==
ArtWorks Release History
Version	Released	New features
1.7		Last release by Computer Concepts.
2.01	2003	Support for 32-bit addressing modes on CPU. Flat transparency, text areas, Sprite/GIF/TIFF/SVG export, hatching and user-defined pattern-fills, native JPEG support, dynamic object replication, new grids, static shape clipping, UI enhancements.
2.07	2003	Page rulers, JPEG and text export.
2.2	2004	Dynamic clipping.
2.3	2004	Graduated (linear/radial) transparency with profiles, CMYK ink simulation.
2.5	2005	Export PDF documents.
2.6	2006	New arrowhead designs, real-time editing of graduated fills.
2.7	2007	Support for multi-page documents.
2.8	2008	Ability to import PDF documents.
2.9	2009	PNG and other bitmap export with Alpha Transparency intact.
2.XI	2011	Compatible with ARMv7 RISC OS machines, Styles Panel.
2.X2	2012	Artistic Lines.
2.X3	2017	Shape Painter/Eraser tool, support for LTRGB screen modes used on more recent RISC OS platforms.
