= Iyonix PC =

Acorn-clone personal computer

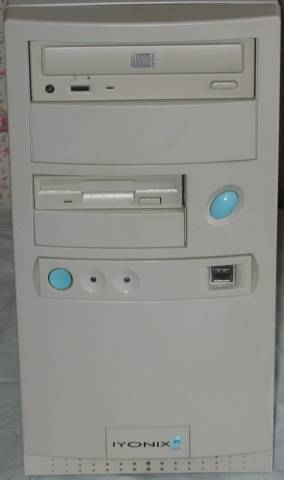
- Iyonix front, showing drives (CD-RW, floppy disk), power button, reset button, LEDs, USB ports
- Developer: Castle Technology
- Manufacturer: Castle Technology
- Released: 22 October 2002
- Discontinued: 30 September 2008
- Media: CD-RW, floppy disk
- Operating system: RISC OS, Linux
- CPU: ARMv5 XScale
- Graphics: Nvidia video card
- Predecessor: Risc PC, A9home
- Successor: Touch Book, ARMini
- Website: iyonix.com at the Wayback Machine (archived 2007-03-04)

The Iyonix PC was an Acorn-clone personal computer sold by Castle Technology and Iyonix Ltd between 2002 and 2008. According to news site Slashdot, it was the first personal computer to use Intel's XScale processor. It ran RISC OS 5.

== History ==
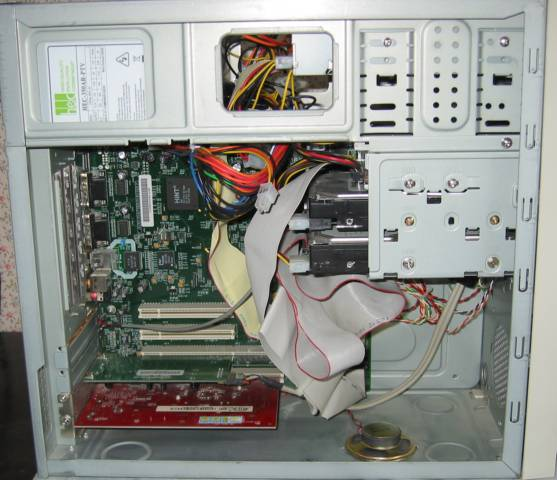
Inside view

The Iyonix originated as a secret project by Pace engineers in connection with development of set-top boxes (STBs), and has been noted as a successor to the RiscPC. Pace had a licence to develop RISCOS Ltd's OS sources for use in the STB market. The Iyonix was developed under the code name Tungsten and uses RISC OS 5, which is a version of RISC OS that supports ARM CPUs with 32-bit addressing modes. The sources and hardware design were subsequently acquired by Castle, who developed them into the final product. Castle continued to keep the project a secret, requiring developers to sign a non-disclosure agreement. Information was distributed to such developers via a confidential section of the website. Customers were occasionally able to buy the computer as a bare bones system for self-assembly.

After speculation on the usenet newsgroups, a website for the hardware was spotted in mid October 2002. Units first went on sale in December 2002. Prices started from £1249.

Castle ceased production of the Iyonix after the July 2006 introduction in the UK of the RoHS Regulations. The design was not compliant and Castle could not afford to redesign the Iyonix to be compliant. Sales continued for another two years via a newly established company, Iyonix Ltd, which enabled Castle to circumvent the regulations.

On 25 September 2008, Castle announced that production of the Iyonix had ceased and that new units would no longer be available to order.

== Features ==
Features include:

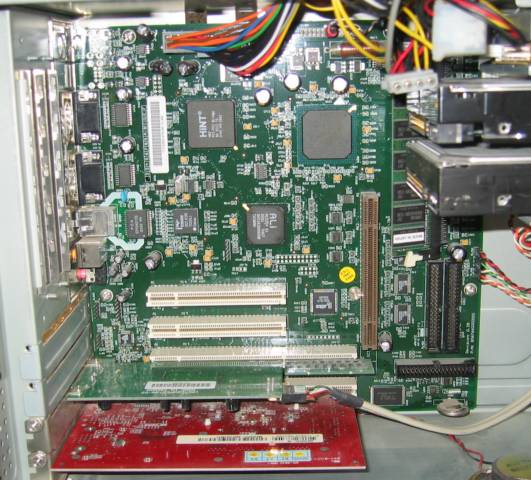
Motherboard, with GeForce 2 MX video card at bottom

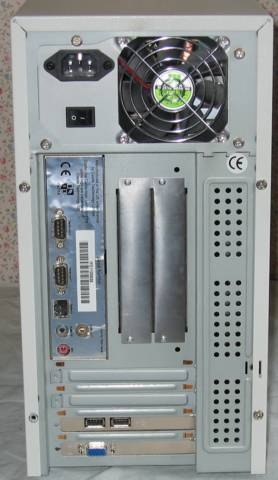
Rear view, showing connectors

- Standard ATX motherboard and Nvidia video card
- Intel XScale 80321 600 MHz 32-bit processor
- Two 64-bit and two 32-bit PCI slots (two occupied by graphics and USB cards, two free)
- RISC OS version 5 in hardware ROM module, using 32-bit addressing mode.
- Support for the Linux operating system
- Support for "legacy" Acorn DEBI expansion cards
- USB interfacing

It was the first time substantial changes had been made to the platform since the release of the Risc PC in 1994. All interim machines had been built on the ARM7500 system on a chip, which was widely regarded as a single-chip Risc PC. (It incorporated the memory controller, video, sound, IO and CPU logic of a Risc PC, leaving only memory and disc interfacing to be added.)

The presence of PCI and USB capabilities, as well as the retained "podule" bus, attracted comparisons to Acorn's aborted Phoebe PC; however, such comparisons should be tempered with Phoebe's proposed feature set, which retained VIDC and 26-bit mode, and although Phoebe was intended to be capable of SMP configurations, its proposed shipping configuration had been for one SA110 CPU.
