= RISC OS Open =

Software company

RISC OS Open Ltd.
- Company type: Private
- Industry: Computer software
- Founded: Worthing, UK (20 June 2006; 19 years ago)
- Founder: Ben Avison, Andrew Hodgkinson, Andrew Moyler, Richard Nicoll, Steve Revill
- Headquarters: Cambridge, UK
- Area served: Worldwide
- Key people: Steve Revill, Co-founder and Managing director Ben Avison, Co-founder; Andrew Hodgkinson, Co-founder
- Products: RISC OS 5
- Services: IT consulting
- Website: riscosopen.org

RISC OS Open Ltd. (also referred to as ROOL) is a limited company engaged in computer software and IT consulting. It is managing the process of publishing the source code to RISC OS. Company founders include staff who formerly worked for Pace, the company which acquired RISC OS after Acorn's demise.

The source code publication was initially facilitated by a shared source initiative (SSI) between ROOL and Castle Technology (CTL), prior to a switch to the more widely recognised Apache licence in October 2018. ROOL hopes that by making the RISC OS source code available for free it will help stimulate development of both the RISC OS source code and the platform as a whole.

== Operations ==
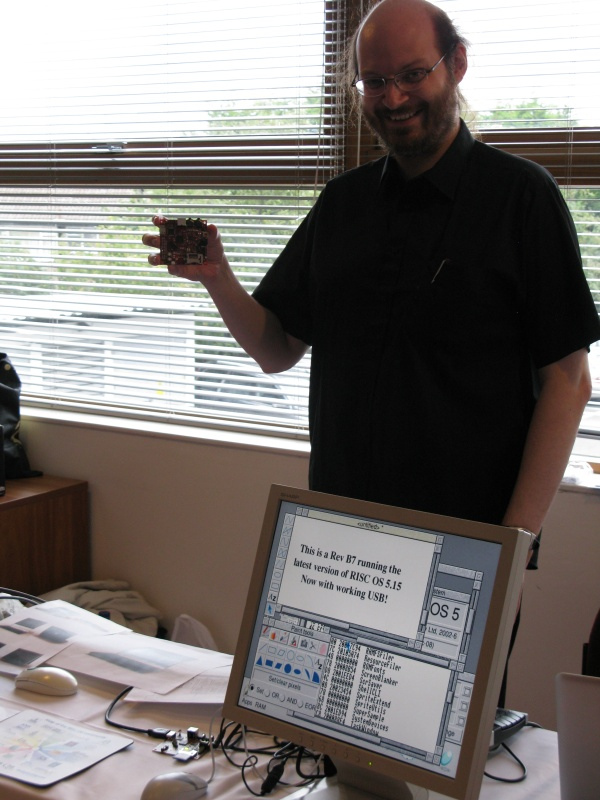
Ben Avison showing a BeagleBoard in 2009

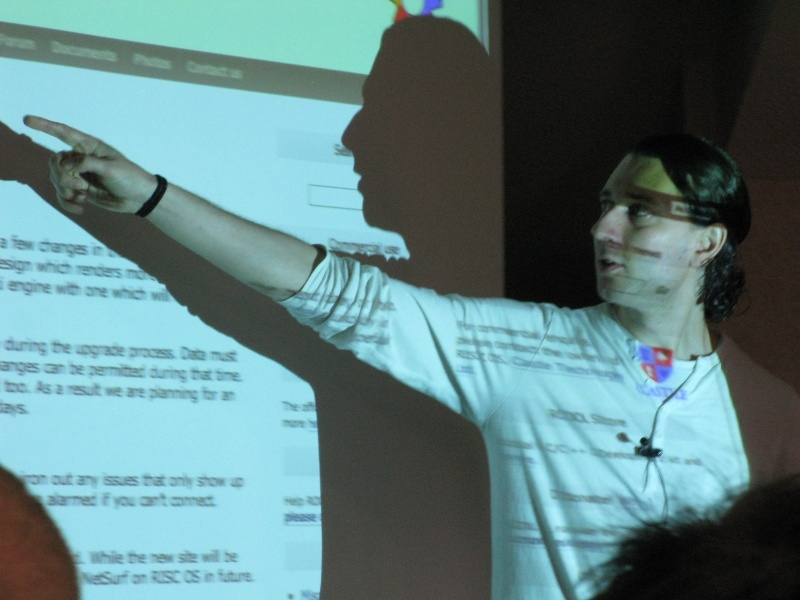
Steve Revill in 2011

ROOL set initial goals to make the source code easily available (on the web), and also to establish a wiki, forum and bug tracker. These have been available since December 2006.

Operations exist to facilitate tasks related to ROOL's goals. Additionally, staff undertake development work on the code themselves. Since early 2009, ownership, development and sales of the Acorn C/C++ tools were transferred to RISC OS Open. As an extension to the initial goals, in 2011 ROOL introduced a bounty scheme to encourage further development.

Attendance at RISC OS computer shows is often arranged, with other knowledgeable coders sometimes standing in when ROOL staff are unavailable. A Facebook page and Twitter feed was created in 2012 to communicate events via social media.

=== Publishing ===
A number of book titles have been published starting in 2015 with the RISC OS Style Guide, a three book set in support of the Desktop Development Environment, BBC BASIC Reference Manual and the RISC OS 5 User Guide.

=== Forum ===
Online discussions take place on the forum. Developers can seek technical assistance with writing software, debugging, and porting the operating system to new hardware. End users can seek assistance with applications, emulation, and enquiries of a more general nature. A common area exists to make announcements that are broadly related to the theme of RISC OS, and discussion of future wish list features or applications.
