= Touch Book =

Portable computing device designed by Always Innovating

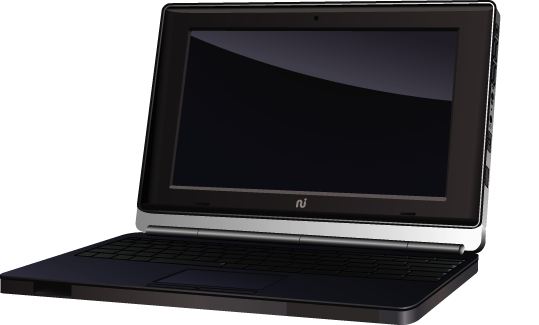
- Always Innovating Touch Book
- Manufacturer: Always Innovating
- Type: NetBook, smartbook, UMPC
- Operating system: Fork of Ångström (Linux), Ubuntu, Android
- CPU: Overclocked 720 MHz OMAP3530 ARM Cortex-A8 (32-bit) and 420 MHz DSP core, NEON support
- Memory: 512 MB low power DDR-333
- Storage: SDHC slot with 8 GB SD card, 256 MB internal NAND
- Input: touchscreen, keyboard, touchpad and supports any external USB input device
- Connectivity: Wi-Fi, 7× USB 2.0 ports, Bluetooth
- Website: www.alwaysinnovating.com

The Touch Book is a portable computing device that functions as a netbook, and a tablet computer. Designed by Always Innovating, a company situated in the city of Menlo Park, in California, USA, it was launched at the DEMO conference in March 2009. Its designers stated at launch that it is the first netbook featuring a detachable keyboard with a long battery life (more than 10 hours). It is based on the ARM TI OMAP3530 processor (taking advantage of the BeagleBoard and existing open source software) and features a touchscreen.

First units to customers were shipped in August 2009. There were some (expected) software issues for early adopters, which are being progressively addressed. There were also some hardware issues, which resulted in community discontent.

After much speculation on the community forum, a revised v.2 Touch Book and new Smart Book product were announced. The Smart Book is based on the BeagleBoard-xM design.

== Overview ==
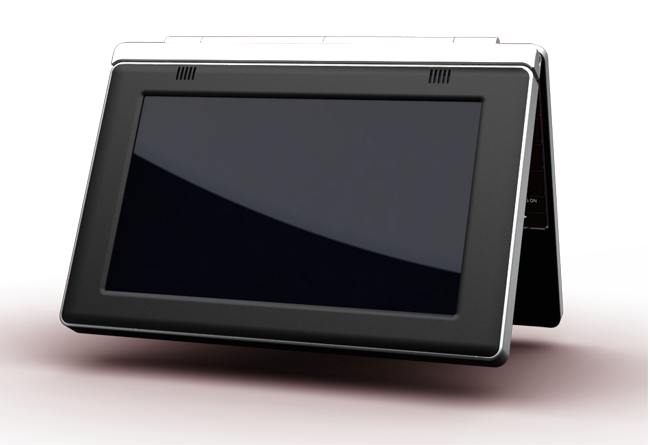
The Touch Book, in its "reverse" mode

The Touch Book is a netbook and a touch tablet device. It features a detachable keyboard, a removable back cover to access the electronics of the device, and several Linux distributions shipped by default and offered via a multiboot system.

The default operating system launched is a custom Linux OS based on Ångström, being custom themed to fit the small form factor. Since 2010, the Touch Book comes with a multi-boot graphical interface, allowing users to run also Ubuntu and Android. Users can install other OSes like Gentoo and RISC OS.

Touch Book's major intended uses are media viewing and web browsing, although more power-hungry applications such as OpenOffice.org are available on the device. The Touch Book ships standard graphics libraries such as OpenGL ES and SDL.

The Always Innovating team claims the device follows an open hardware philosophy, so that anyone can access the hardware design from the company's website, modify it and redistribute it. Although the business model of open hardware is still maturing, it seems to be profitable to the company

In addition to this open hardware approach, the Touch Book fully relies on open source software. A Git repository of the entire OS is currently available, allowing for download of the latest kernel source as well as the different root file systems. A community of contributors has emerged and is interacting with the Always Innovating developers.

== Technical specifications ==
- ARM 600 MHz (overclocked to 720 MHz) Cortex-A8 superscalar microprocessor core: Texas Instruments OMAP3530 System-on-Chip
- 512 MB DDR-333 SDRAM
- 256 MB NAND flash memory
- DSP Core video processor at 430 MHz
- OpenGL ES 2.0 compliant
- Freescale-based 3D accelerometer
- Integrated Ralink-based Wi-Fi 802.11b/g/n
- Integrated Bluetooth 2.0
- 1024x600 resolution touchscreen LCD, 8.9" widescreen, 16.7 million colors
- SDHC card slot (currently supporting up to 32 GB of storage)
- Headphone output, microphone input
- Standard QWERTY keyboard and touchpad
- USB 2.0 OTG port (480 Mbit/s)
- 6× USB 2.0 host ports (480 Mbit/s)
- JTAG debugging interface
- Runs the Linux kernel (2.6.x)
- Dual 12000mAh + 6000mAh rechargeable lithium polymer battery
- Estimated 10+ hour battery life for video and general applications
- Detachable magnet system for the tablet
- Dimensions: 248 mm × 158 mm × 19 mm for the tablet, 248 mm × 180 mm × 33.5 mm for the full netbook
- Mass: 675 g for the Tablet; 1,418 g for the full netbook

== Similar products ==
Other single-board computers using OMAP3500 series processors include OSWALD, BeagleBoard, IGEPv2, Pandora and Gumstix Overo series. Since launch of the device in March 2009, several similar devices have come up in early 2010, such as the Freescale tablet reference design or the Lenovo U1 IdeaPad. or the Panasonic Toughbook.
