= RISCOS Ltd. =

Former computer software company in UK

- Type: Private
- Industry: Computer software
- Founded: January 7, 1999; 27 years ago, in Cardiff, UK
- Founder: Paul Middleton
- Defunct: May 14, 2013
- Fate: Dissolved
- Headquarters: Cardiff, UK
- Area served: Worldwide
- Key people: Paul Middleton (CEO)
- Products: RISC OS 4, RISC OS 6
- Services: IT consulting
- Website: riscos.com (before 2013-03-04)

RISCOS Ltd. (also referred to as ROL) was a limited company engaged in computer software and IT consulting. It licensed the rights to continue the development of RISC OS 4 and to distribute it for desktop machines (as an upgrade or for new machines) from Element 14 and subsequently Pace Micro Technology. Company founders include developers who formerly worked within Acorn's dealership network. It was established as a nonprofit company. On or before 4 March 2013 3QD Developments acquired RISCOS Ltd's flavour of RISC OS. RISCOS Ltd was dissolved on 14 May 2013.

== History ==
RISCOS Ltd was formed to continue end-user-focused development of RISC OS after the de-listing of Acorn Computers, following its purchase by Morgan Stanley Dean Witter in order to benefit from the shareholding that Acorn held in ARM Ltd. In March 1999, RISCOS Ltd obtained exclusive rights to develop and sell RISC OS 4 for the desktop market from Element 14. A few weeks later Pace purchased Acorn's Cambridge headquarters and staff for £200,000 and then continued to develop its own, in-house version of RISC OS, primarily for set-top boxes and other embedded devices.

At the time of the company's formation, it was noted that having access to the source code could facilitate removal of the OS's dependence on Acorn's proprietary chips. This simplifies entry to the hardware market by new companies.

On 29 January and 14 May 2013 RISCOS Ltd was listed in the London Gazette: on 14 May 2013 it was struck from the register of companies and dissolved. The rights to all versions of RISC OS previously developed and marketed by RISCOS Ltd were purchased by 3QD Developments Ltd, the maker of VirtualAcorn.

== Products ==
=== RISC OS 4 ===

RISCOS Ltd completed work on RISC OS 4 and in July 1999 it was released as an upgrade for existing machines, priced at £120. Improvements include support for long filenames, larger disk sizes and partitions, along with a new desktop look.

Work then continued on a system of soft-loaded updated versions of the OS, released under an annual subscription release scheme named RISC OS Select in 2002.

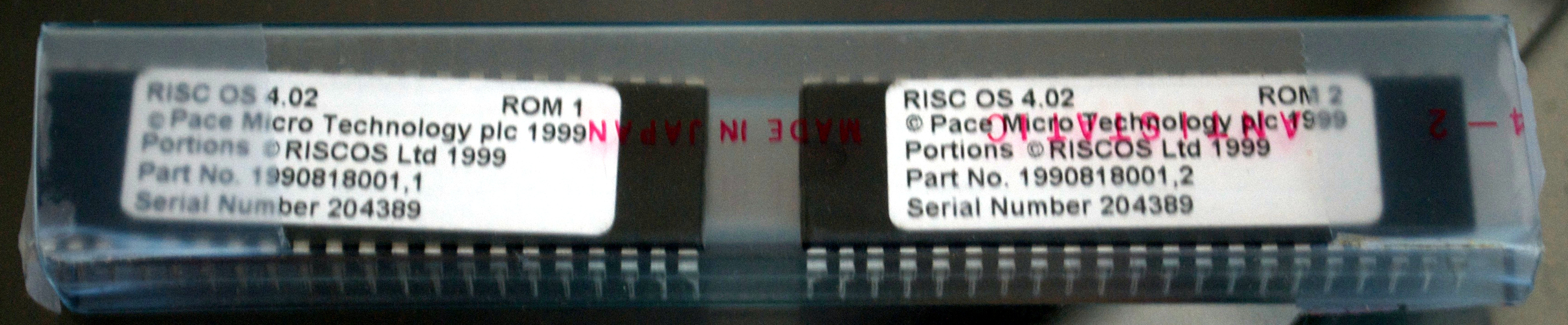
RISC OS 4.02 ROMs

In 2004, the company replaced its baseline RISC OS 4.02 product with an updated version of the OS named RISC OS Adjust. This version of RISC OS was based on version 4.39, or Select Edition 3 Issue 4, of the company's Select scheme. In the same year, RISCOS Ltd agreed to produce a fully 32-bit-compatible version of RISC OS Adjust for Advantage Six's A9home product. The A9home was released in May 2006 after a 12-month beta-testing process, although the build of Adjust 32, namely RISC OS 4.42, is not feature-complete.

=== RISC OS Six ===
RISC OS Six was intended to represent the next generation of RISCOS Ltd's operating system. Significant improvements in portability, stability and internal structure, including full 26/32-bit neutrality, were to lay the foundation for the company's future releases. In October 2006, a beta version of RISC OS Six was made available for download by subscribers to the Select programme. The first full release of RISC OS Six was made available in early 2007. The final release of RISC OS Six was RISC OS 6.20, in December 2009. The latest versions run on the Risc PC, A7000, A7000+, A9home and Risc PC emulators, but not on newer generation hardware. RISC OS Six boots from a RISC OS 4.02 or 4.39 ROM.

=== Licensed emulation ===
In 2003, the company reached an agreement with VirtualAcorn to license its OS for use with emulators.

=== Potential ports ===
In 1999, the company announced plans to port the OS to machines such as the Jornada sub-notebook. A number of planned ports did not come to fruition.

== Licence dispute ==
In November 2002 Castle Technology Ltd released a modified version of Pace's 32-bit RISC OS as RISC OS 5 for their Iyonix PC, in apparent contravention of the licence agreement that RISCOS Ltd held with Element 14. In July 2003, Castle bought all technology rights to RISC OS from Pace in an attempt to legalise the situation. In January 2004, Castle also took over Tematic Ltd., the company formed by ex-Pace engineers when they were made redundant in March 2003. The result was a long-running and acrimonious dispute between RISCOS Ltd and Castle over licensing, which ultimately led to Castle claiming to terminate RISCOS Ltd's licence to develop, sell and sub-license RISC OS 4. RISCOS Ltd refuted all the claims made and challenged Castle to identify how and from whom they had acquired RISC OS 5. An end to the dispute was signalled when RISCOS Ltd and Castle agreed to work on attempting to merge their development streams and re-unify RISC OS, with Castle's engineers working on key system functionality and RISCOS Ltd on user-facing elements. One of the conditions was that RISCOS Ltd agreed to be renamed RISC OS Developments Ltd. ROL and Castle subsequently agreed to merge RISC OS 4 and RISC OS 5 together, this merge nor the name change did not happen before the dissolution of RISCOS Ltd.

RISCOS Ltd considered taking legal action in 2008 to prevent RISC OS Open from releasing a RiscPC compatible ROM image.
