= VirtualAcorn =

- Original authors: Graeme Barnes; Aaron Timbrell
- Developer: 3QD Developments
- Initial release: 2002
- Operating system: RISC OS
- Platform: ARM architecture
- Licence: Proprietary commercial software
- Website: www.virtualacorn.co.uk

VirtualAcorn is the brand name of several commercial emulators of Acorn Computers computer hardware platforms.

== Development ==
VirtualAcorn is developed by Graeme Barnes and Aaron Timbrell. It is a commercial version of the freeware emulator Red Squirrel, developed by Barnes. In 2004, supply of the software was moved to Timbrell's company 3QD Developments.

== Virtual A5000 ==
Virtual A5000
- Operating system: Microsoft Windows
- Type: Emulator
- License: Commercial
- Website: http://www.riscos.com/

Virtual A5000 is an emulator of Acorn Computers A5000 computer. It included a copy of RISC OS 3.11. Virtual A5000 was released at BETT 2002 and stopped shipping in 2004.

It is now commercially available again from riscos.com with the latest version dated 2014.

== VirtualRPC ==
VirtualRPC
- Windows XP running VirtualRPC, which is in turn running a ZX Spectrum emulator
- Operating system: Microsoft Windows, macOS
- Type: Emulator
- License: Commercial
- Website: http://www.virtualacorn.co.uk/

VirtualRPC is an emulator of Acorn Computers' Risc PC computer.

Initially VirtualRPC was only available bundled with the MicroDigital Alpha range of PC laptops, but was later made available as a standalone product for sale. In 2003, the developers reached an agreement with RISCOS Ltd to license its OS.

VirtualRPC comes in four versions, with support for emulating ARM7 or ARM7 and StrongARM each coming with either RISC OS 4.02 or RISC OS Adjust 4.39.

=== Hardware bundles ===
Initially VirtualRPC was included on the MicroDigital Alpha range of PC laptops, and it has also been shipped by Advantage Six on the A5 series and by R-Comp in their RISCube/SpaceCube/RiscBook range.
