= MicroDigital Omega =

Home computerr from the early 2000s

- Developer: MicroDigital
- Type: 32-bit microcomputer
- Released: 2003
- Introductory price: £1149 (ex VAT)
- Operating system: RISC OS 4
- CPU: Intel StrongARM SA110 @ 300 MHz
- Memory: up to 512 MiB of SDRAM
- Display: VGA

The MicroDigital Omega was a home computer developed and sold in the early 2000s by MicroDigital. It runs the RISC OS operating system.

The Omega suffered a protracted development, announced in 2000, it was released in 2003.
