= ROM image =

Data dump from a ROM chip

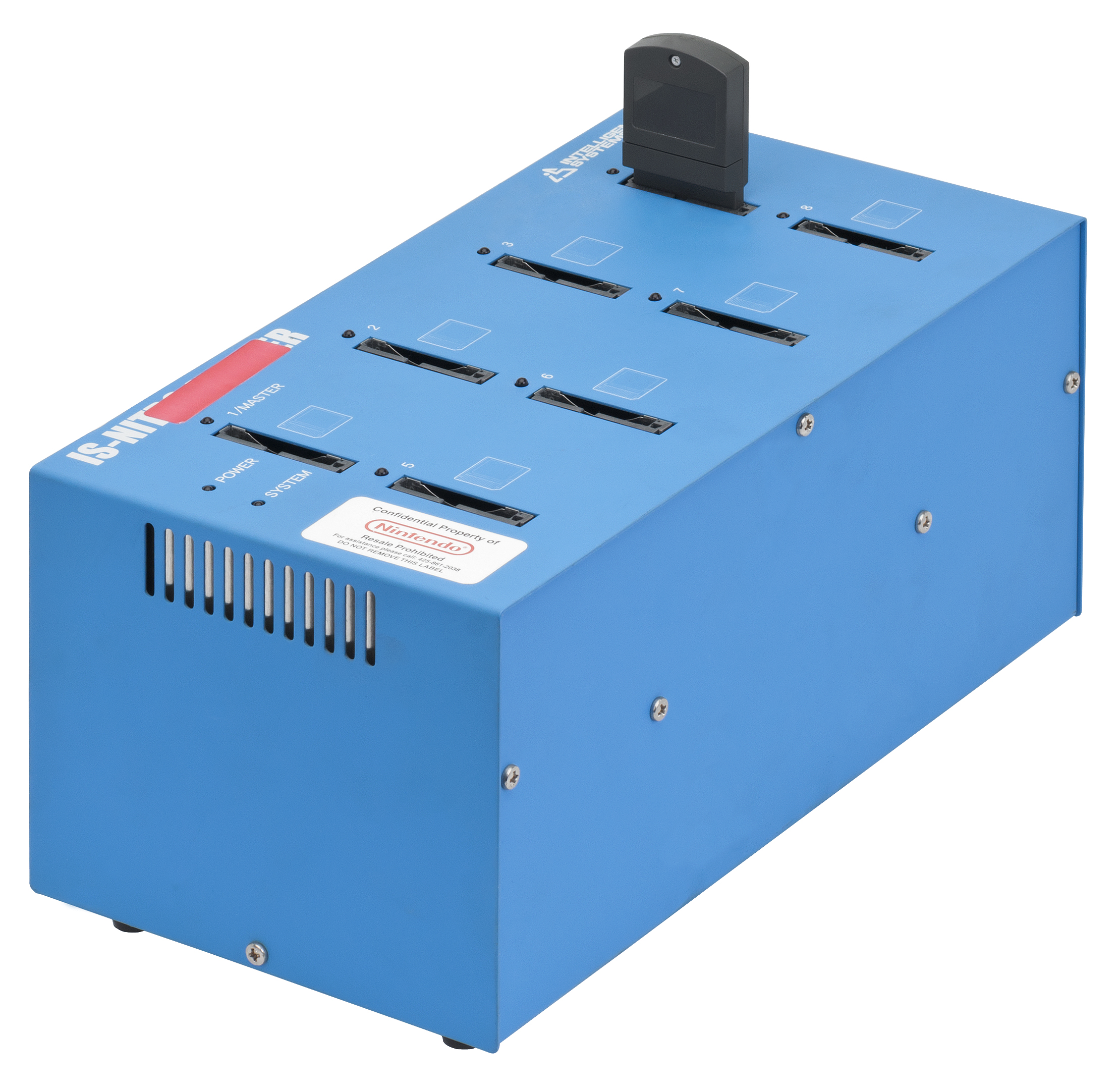
Intelligent Systems ROM burner for the Nintendo DS

A ROM image, ROM file, or simply ROM is a computer file which contains a copy of the data from a read-only memory chip, often from a video game cartridge, or used to contain a computer's firmware, or from an arcade game's main board. The term is frequently used in the context of emulation, whereby older games or firmware are copied to ROM files on modern computers and can, using a piece of software known as an emulator, be run on a different device than which they were designed for. ROM burners are used to copy ROM images to hardware, such as ROM cartridges, or ROM chips, for debugging and QA testing.

== Creation ==
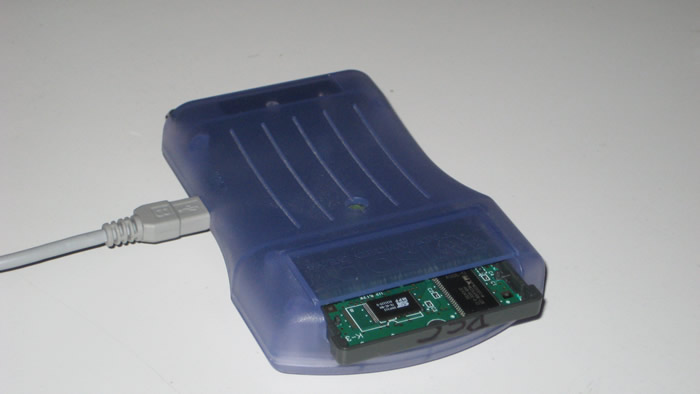
A ROM dumping device for the Game Boy Advance

ROMs can be copied from the read-only memory chips found in cartridge-based games and many arcade machines using a dedicated device in a process known as dumping. For most common home video game systems, these devices are widely available, examples being the Doctor V64, or the Retrode.

Dumping ROMs from arcade machines, which are highly customized PCBs, often requires individual setups for each machine along with a large amount of expertise.

=== Copy protection mechanisms ===
While ROM images are often used as a means of preserving the history of computer games, they are also often used to facilitate the unauthorized copying and redistribution of modern games. Viewing this as potentially reducing sales of their products, many game companies have incorporated features into newer games which are designed to prevent copying, while still allowing the original game to be played. For instance, the GameCube uses non-standard 8 cm DVD-like optical media, which for a long time prevented games stored on those discs from being copied. It was not until a security hole was found in Phantasy Star Online Episode I & II that GameCube games could be successfully copied, using the GameCube itself to read the discs.

SNK also employed a method of copy prevention on their Neo Geo games, starting with The King of Fighters in 1999, which used an encryption algorithm on the graphics ROMs to prevent them from being played in an emulator. Many thought that this would mark the end of Neo Geo emulation. However, as early as 2000, hackers found a way to decrypt and dump the ROMs successfully, making them playable once again in a Neo Geo emulator.

Another company which used to employ methods of copy prevention on their arcade games was Capcom, which is known for its CPS-2 arcade board. This contained a heavy copy protection algorithm which was not broken until 7 years after the system's release in 1993. The original crack by the CPS2Shock Team was not a true emulation of the protection because it used XOR tables to bypass the original encryption and allow the game to play in an emulator. Their stated intent was to wait until CPS-2 games were no longer profitable to release the decryption method (three years after the last game release). The full decryption algorithm was cracked in 2007 by Nicola Salmoria, Andreas Naive and Charles MacDonald of the MAME development team.

Another copy prevention technique used in cartridge-games was to have the game attempt to write to ROM. On an authentic cartridge this would do nothing; however, emulators would often allow the write to succeed. Pirate cartridges also often used writable chips instead of ROM. By reading the value back to see whether the write succeeded, the game could tell whether it was running from an authentic cartridge. Alternatively, the game may simply attempt to overwrite critical program instructions, which if successful renders it unplayable.

Some games, such as Game Boy games, also had other hardware such as memory bank controllers connected to the cartridge bus. The game would send data to this hardware by attempting to write it to specific areas of ROM; thus, if the ROM were writable, this process would corrupt data.

Capcom's latest arcade board is the CPS-3. This was resistant to emulation attempts until June 2007, when the encryption method was reverse-engineered by Andreas Naive. It is currently implemented by MAME and a variant of the CPS-2 emulator Nebula.

== Uses ==
=== Emulation ===
Video game console emulators typically take ROM images as input files.

=== Software ROM ===
ROM images are used when developing for embedded computers. Software which is being developed for embedded computers is often written to ROM files for testing on a standard computer before it is written to a ROM chip for use in the embedded systems.

=== Digital preservation ===
The lifespan of digital media is rarely great. While black-and-white photographs may survive for a century or more, many digital media can become unreadable after only 10 years. This is beginning to become a problem as early computer systems may be presently fifty or sixty years old while early home video consoles may be almost forty years old. Due to this aging, there is a significant worry that many early computer and video games may not survive without being transferred to new media. So, those with an interest in preservation are actively seeking older arcade and video games and attempting to dump them to ROM images. When stored on standardized media such as CD-ROMs and DVD-ROMs, they can be copied to future media with significantly reduced effort.

The trend towards mass digital distribution of ROM image files, while potentially damaging to copyright holders, may also have a positive effect on preservation. While over time many original ROM copies of older games may deteriorate, be broken or thrown away, a copy in file form may be distributed throughout the world, allowing games which would otherwise have been lost a greater chance of survival.

=== Hacks and fan translations ===
Once games have been made available in ROM format, it is possible for users to make modifications. This may take the form of altering graphics, changing game levels, tweaking difficulty factor, or even translation into a language for which a game was not originally made available. Hacks can often take humorous forms, as is the case with a hack of the NES version of Mario Bros., titled Afro Mario Brothers, which features the famous brothers wearing Afro haircuts. The Metroid Redesign mod is a hack of Super Metroid that revamps the game and adds new objectives.

A large scene has developed to translate games into other languages. Many games receive a release in one part of the world, but not in another. For example, many role-playing video games released in Japan go unreleased in the West and East outside Japan. A group of fan translators will often translate the game themselves to meet demand for titles. For example, the 1995 game Tales of Phantasia was only officially released in Japan; DeJap Translations translated the game's on-screen text into English in 2001. Further to this, a project called Vocals of Phantasia was begun to translate the actual speech from the game. An official English version was not released until March 2006, some five years after the text translation was released. Another example was that of Mother 3, a Japan-only sequel to the cult-favorite Earthbound. In spite of massive fan response and several petitions for an English translation, the only response from Nintendo was that Mother 3 would be translated and released in Europe, which it never was. Instead, the fan website Starmen.net undertook a massive translation project and released the translated version of Mother 3 in October, 2008. The translation was praised by fans and even employees from Nintendo, Square Enix, and other industry professionals.

The Japanese N64 game Dōbutsu no Mori (Animal Forest) has also been translated into English. The game was originally only released on N64 in Japan, but it was ported to GameCube and renamed Animal Crossing.

Hacks may range from simple tweaks such as graphic fixes and cheats, to full-blown redesigns of the game, in effect creating an entirely new game using the original as a base.

== Similar image types ==
Image files derived from computer tape are known as tape images, while those derived from floppy disks and CD-ROMs (and other disk formats) are known as disk images. Images copied from optical media are also called ISO images, after one of the standard file systems for optical media, ISO 9660.

Creating images from other media is often considerably easier and can often be performed with off-the-shelf hardware. For example, the creation of tape images from games stored on magnetic tapes (from, for example, the Sinclair ZX80 computer) generally involves simply playing the magnetic tape using a standard audio tape player connected to the line-in of a PC sound card. This is then recorded to an audio file and transformed into a tape image file using another program. Likewise, many CD and DVD games may be copied using a standard PC CD/DVD drive.

== See also ==
- Intel HEX (sometimes, files with the .ROM file extension do not contain data in binary but in Intel hex format)
