= BeagleBoard =

Single board computer

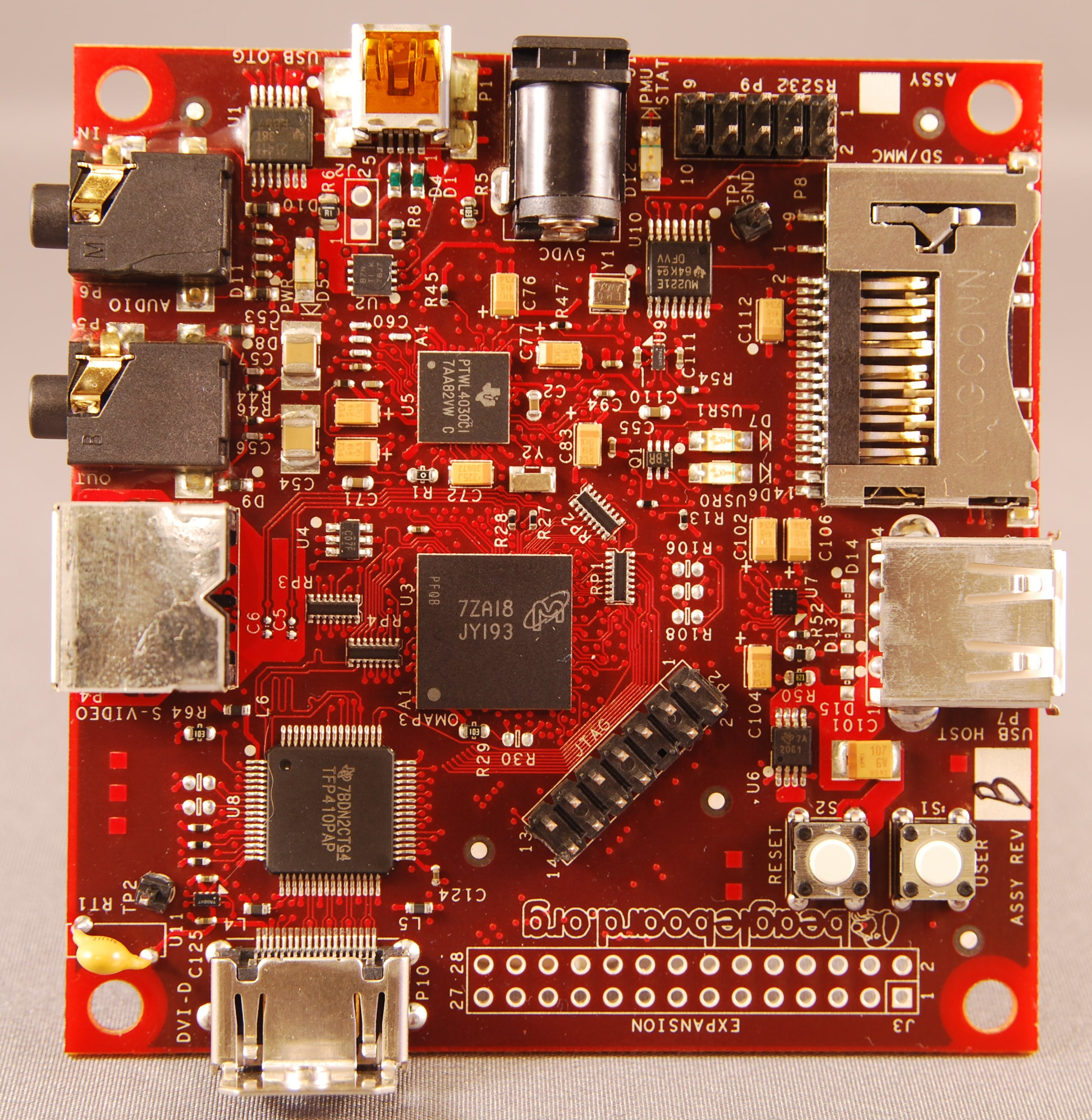
- BeagleBoard rev.B
- Common manufacturers: Circuitco LLC on behalf of BeagleBoard.org
- Design firm: Texas Instruments
- Introduced: BeagleBoard; July 28, 2008; BeagleBoard rev.C; May 13, 2009; BeagleBoard-xM; September 14, 2010; BeagleBone; October 31, 2011; BeagleBone Black; April 23, 2013; BeagleBoard-X15; November 1, 2015
- Cost: US$95 to $149
- Type: Single-board computer
- Processor: ARM Cortex-A8
- Frequency: 600 MHz to 1 GHz
- Memory: 128 MB to 512 MB
- Connection: USB On-The-Go
- Ports: USB On-The-Go/DVI-D/PC audio/SDHC/JTAG/HDMI
- Power consumption: 2 W
- Weight: ~37 g
- Dimensions: 7.62 cm × 7.62 cm × 1.6 cm

The BeagleBoard is a low-power open-source single-board computer produced by Texas Instruments in association with Digi-Key and Newark element14. The BeagleBoard was also designed with open source software development in mind, and as a way of demonstrating the Texas Instruments OMAP3530 system-on-a-chip. The board was developed by a small team of engineers as an educational board that could be used in colleges around the world to teach open source hardware and software capabilities. It is also sold to the public under the Creative Commons share-alike license. The board was designed using Cadence OrCAD for schematics and Cadence Allegro for PCB manufacturing; no simulation software was used.

== Features ==
The BeagleBoard measures approximately 75 by 75 mm and has all the functionality of a basic computer. The OMAP3530 includes an ARM Cortex-A8 CPU (which can run Linux, Minix, FreeBSD, OpenBSD, RISC OS, or Symbian; a number of unofficial Android ports exist), a TMS320C64x+ DSP for accelerated video and audio decoding, and an Imagination Technologies PowerVR SGX530 GPU to provide accelerated 2D and 3D rendering that supports OpenGL ES 2.0. Video out is provided through separate S-Video and HDMI connections. A single SD/MMC card slot supporting SDIO, a USB On-The-Go port, an RS-232 serial connection, a JTAG connection, and two stereo 3.5 mm jacks for audio in/out are provided.

Built-in storage and memory are provided through a PoP chip that includes 256 MB of NAND flash memory and 256 MB of RAM (128 MB on earlier models).

The board uses up to 2 W of power and can be powered from the USB connector, or a separate 5 V power supply.

== Rev. C4 specifications ==
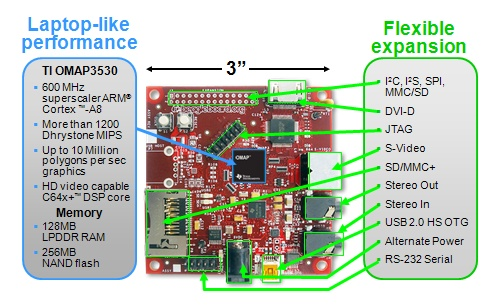
BeagleBoard described

- Package on package (PoP) SoC/Memory chip.
  - Processor TI OMAP3530 SoC – 720 MHz ARM Cortex-A8 core
  - "HD capable" TMS320C64x+ core (520 MHz up to 720p @30 fps)
  - Imagination Technologies PowerVR SGX 2D/3D graphics processor supporting dual independent displays
  - 256 MB LPDDR RAM
  - 256 MB NAND Flash memory
- Peripheral connections
  - DVI-D (HDMI connector chosen for size – maximum resolution is 1280 × 1024 – and it does not output digital audio)
  - S-Video
  - USB OTG (mini AB)
  - 1 USB port
  - SD/MMC card slot
  - Stereo in and out jacks
  - RS-232 port
  - JTAG connector
  - Power socket (5 V barrel connector type)
- Development
  - Boot code stored in ROM
  - Boot from NAND memory, SD/MMC, USB, or serial
  - Alternative boot source button.
  - Has been demonstrated using Android, Angstrom Linux, Fedora, Ubuntu, Gentoo, Arch Linux ARM, openSUSE for ARM and Maemo Linux distributions, VxWorks, FreeBSD, the Windows CE operating system, Symbian, QNX and a version of RISC OS 5 made available by RISC OS Open.

== BeagleBoard-xM ==
=== Features ===
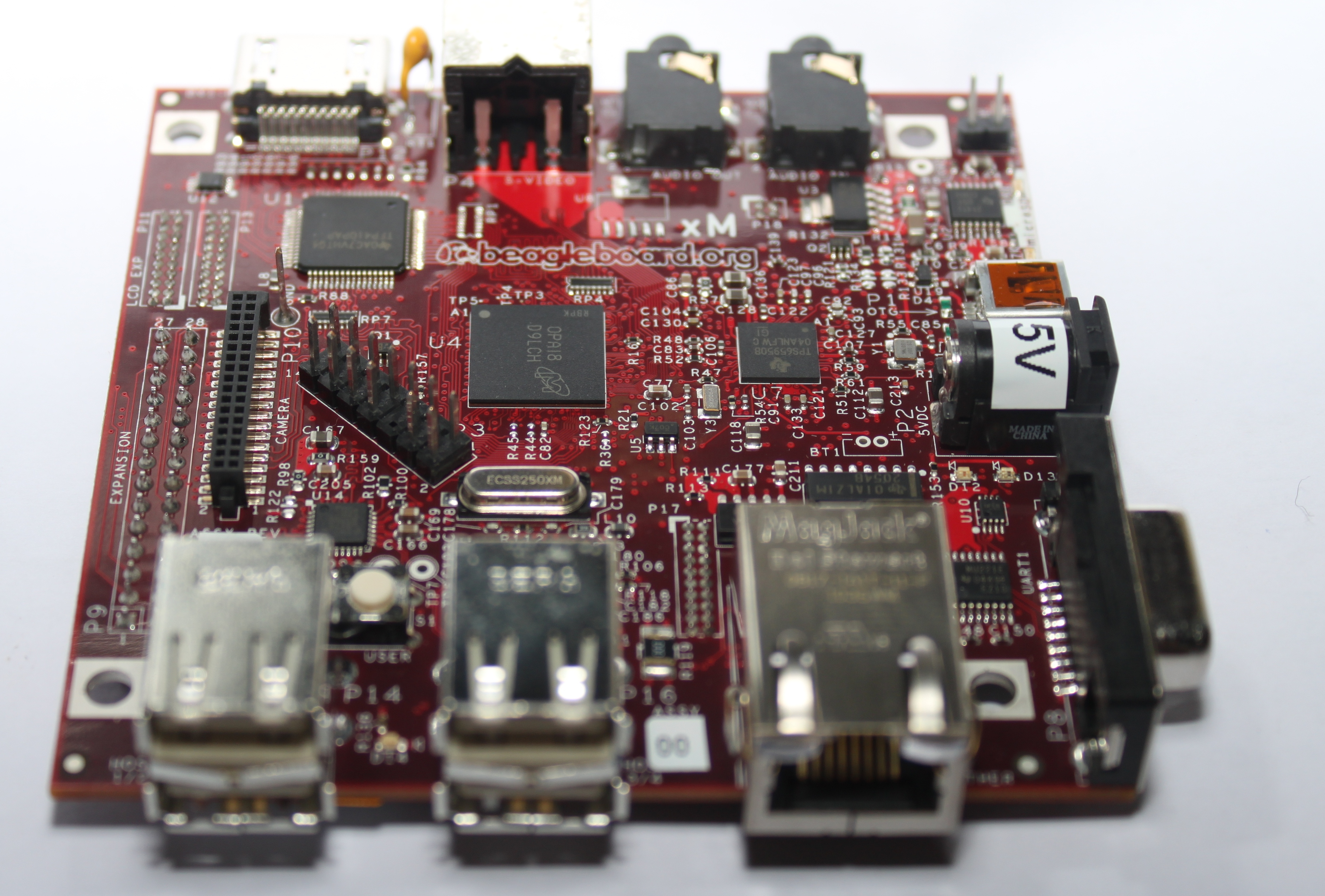
-xM board

A modified version of the BeagleBoard called the BeagleBoard-xM started shipping on August 27, 2010. The BeagleBoard-xM measures in at 82.55 by 82.55 mm and has a faster CPU core (clocked at 1 GHz compared to the 720 MHz of the BeagleBoard), more RAM (512 MB compared to 256 MB), onboard Ethernet jack, and 4 port USB hub. The BeagleBoard-xM lacks the onboard NAND and therefore requires the OS and other data to be stored on a microSD card. The addition of the Camera port to the -xM provides a simple way of importing video via Leopard Board cameras.

=== Specifications ===
- Package on Package POP CPU/memory chip.
  - Processor TI DM3730 Processor – 1 GHz ARM Cortex-A8 core
  - 'HD capable' TMS320C64x+ core (800 MHz up to 720p @30 fps)
  - Imagination Technologies PowerVR SGX 2D/3D graphics processor supporting dual independent displays
  - 512 MB LPDDR RAM
  - 4 GB microSD card supplied with the BeagleBoard-xM and loaded with The Angstrom Distribution
- Peripheral connections
  - DVI-D (HDMI connector chosen for size – maximum resolution is 1400 x 1050)
  - S-Video
  - USB OTG (mini AB)
  - 4 USB ports
  - Ethernet
  - MicroSD/MMC card
  - Stereo in and out jacks
  - RS-232 port
  - JTAG connector
  - Power socket (5 V barrel connector type)
  - Camera port
  - Expansion port
- Development
  - Boot code stored on the uSD card
  - Boot from uSD/MMC only
  - Alternative Boot source button.
  - Has been demonstrated using Android, Angstrom Linux, Fedora, Ubuntu, Gentoo, Arch Linux ARM and Maemo Linux distributions, FreeBSD, the Windows CE operating system, and RISC OS.

== BeagleBone ==
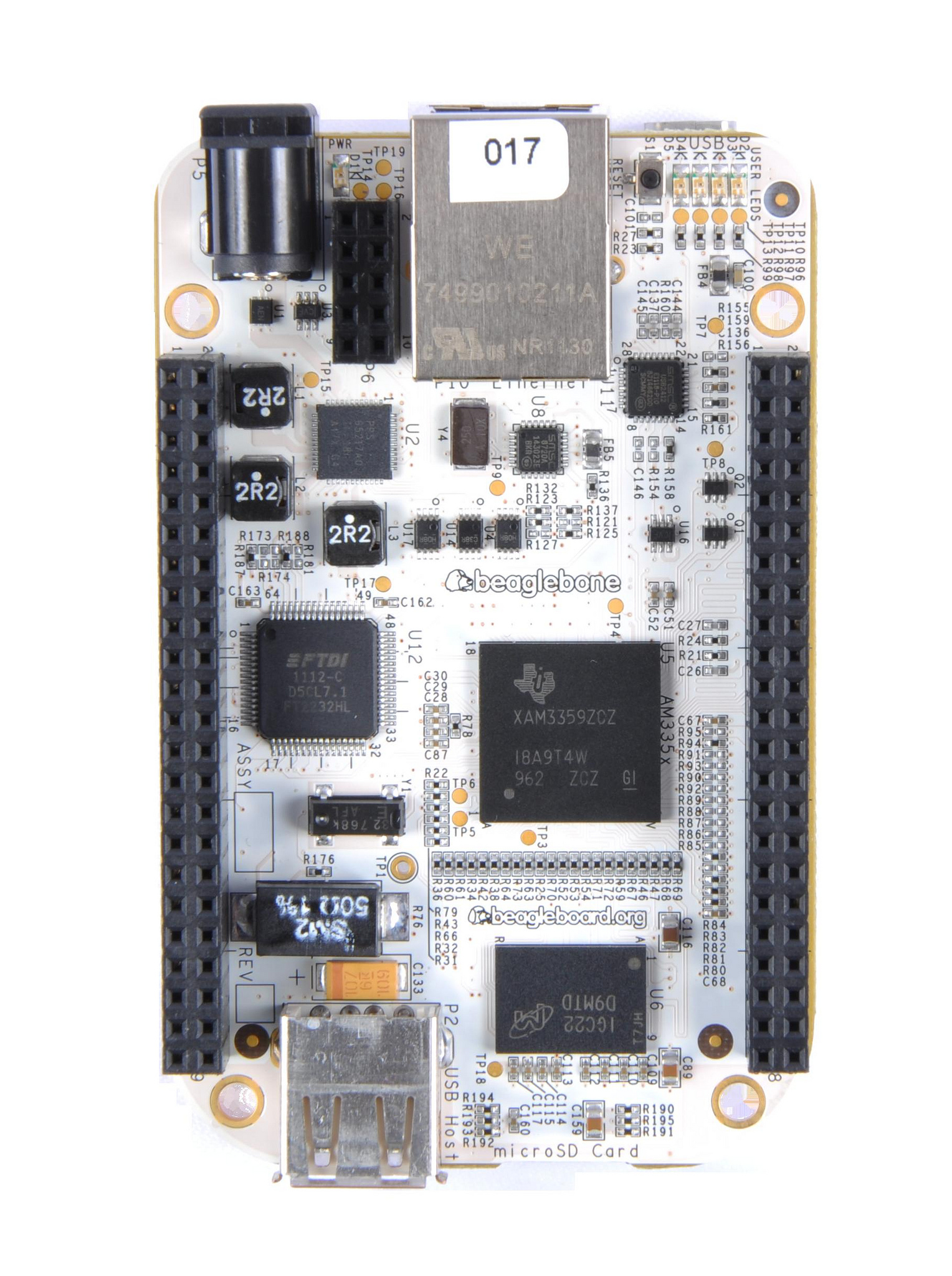
BeagleBone

Announced in the end of October 2011, the BeagleBone is a barebone development board. It can fit inside an Altoids tin. The BeagleBone was initially priced at US$89.

The BeagleBone has a Sitara ARM Cortex-A8 processor running at 720 MHz, 256 MB of RAM, two 46-pin expansion connectors, on-chip Ethernet, a microSD slot, and a USB host port and multipurpose device port which includes low-level serial control and JTAG hardware debug connections, so no JTAG emulator is required.

A number of BeagleBone "Capes" have recently been released. These capes are expansion boards which can be stacked onto the BeagleBone Board (up to four at one time). BeagleBone capes include but are not limited to:

- LCD touchscreen capes (7" and 3.5")
- DVI-D cape
- Breakout cape
- Breadboard cape
- CAN bus cape
- RS-232 cape
- Battery cape

== BeagleBone Black ==
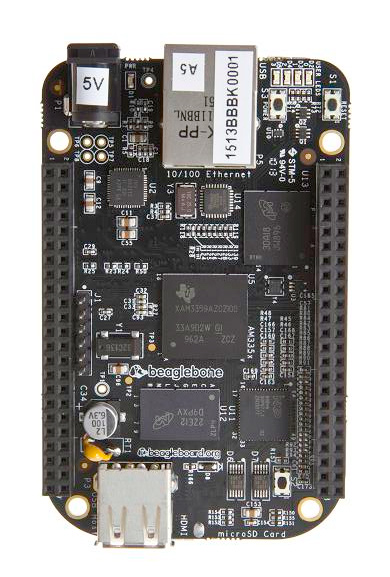
Beaglebone Black

Launched on April 23, 2013, at a price of $45. Among other differences, it increases RAM to 512 MB, it increases the processor clock to 1 GHz, and it adds HDMI and 2 GB of eMMC flash memory. The BeagleBone Black also ships with Linux kernel 3.8, upgraded from the original BeagleBone's Linux kernel 3.2, allowing the BeagleBone Black to take advantage of Direct Rendering Manager (DRM).

BeagleBone Black Revision C (released in 2014) increased the size of the flash memory to 4 GB. This enables it to ship with Debian Linux installed. Previous revisions shipped with Ångström Linux.

== BeagleBoard-X15 ==
The BeagleBoard-X15 is based on the TI Sitara AM5728 processor with two ARM Cortex-A15 cores running at 1.5 GHz, two ARM Cortex-M4 cores running at 212 MHz and two TI C66x DSP cores running at 700 MHz. The processor provides USB 3.0 support and has a PowerVR dual-core SGX544 GPU running at 532 MHz.

== PocketBeagle ==
Launched in September 2017, PocketBeagle offers identical computing performance to BeagleBone Black in a physical form factor that offers over 50% reduction in size and 75% reduction in weight, along with over 40% cheaper purchase price (December 2018 MSRP US$25 vs. US$45 for BeagleBone Black). The miniaturization was made possible by using the Octavo Systems OSD3358-SM that shrinks all major subsystems of the BeagleBone Black into a single ceramic package attached using ball grid array. The advantages of the miniaturization come at the cost of removal of all built-in connectors except for a single micro USB port, the removal of on-board eMMC flash storage, and a reduction of header pins from 92 down to 72 due to space constraints, meaning that most capes will either not work at all or need heavy modifications to work with PocketBeagle. Just as the BeagleBone Black's printed circuit board (PCB) is cut to fit snugly in an Altoids mint tin, PocketBeagle's PCB is cut to fit snugly in an Altoids Smalls mint tin. Recommended use cases for PocketBeagle include embedded devices where size and weight considerations are most critical, such as quadcopter drones and other miniaturized robotics, along with handheld gaming applications.

== Specifications ==
	BeagleV-Ahead	BeaglePlay	BeagleBone AI-64	BeagleBone AI	PocketBeagle	BeagleBoard-X15	BeagleBone Black	BeagleBone	BeagleBoard-xM	BeagleBoard
Release date:	July 12, 2023	March 8, 2023	June 14, 2022	September 19, 2019	September 21, 2017	September 23, 2016	April 23, 2013	October 31, 2011	September 14, 2010	July 28, 2008
SoC	Alibaba TH1520	AM625	TDA4VM	AM5729	OSD3358-SM	Sitara AM5728	AM3358/9		DM3730	OMAP3530
CPU	Quad C910 (RISC-V RV64GC)	Quad ARM Cortex-A53 + ARM Cortex-M4F (400 MHz)	Dual ARM Cortex-A72 + Quad ARM Cortex-R5F (1000 MHz) + Dual ARM Cortex-R5F (1000 MHz)	AM5729 ARM Cortex-A15	Sitara AM3358 ARM Cortex-A8	Dual ARM Cortex-A15 + Dual ARM M4 (212 MHz) + Quad PRU (200 MHz)	Cortex-A8 + Dual PRU (200 MHz)			
Frequency (MHz)	2000	1400	2000	1500	1000	1500	1000	720	1000	720
GPU	BXM-4-64	PowerVR AXE-1-16	PowerVR 8XE GE8430	Dual PowerVR SGX544	PowerVR SGX530	Dual PowerVR SGX544	PowerVR SGX530 (200 MHz)			
DSP	?	—N/a	TMS320C71x (1000 MHz) + Dual TMS320C66x (1000 MHz) +	Dual TMS320C66x	—N/a	Dual TMS320C66x (700 MHz)	—N/a	—N/a	TMS320C64x+ (800 MHz)	TMS320C64x+ (520 MHz)
Onboard storage:	16 GB eMMC, microSD card	16 GB eMMC, microSD card	16 GB eMMC, microSD card	16 GB eMMC	4KB of EEPROM, microSD card	8-bit eMMC 4 GB, microSD card	8-bit eMMC (Rev B: 2 GB Ångström pre-installed, Rev C: 4 GB Debian pre-installed ), microSD card 3.3 V Supported (No Card Supplied)	microSD card 3.3 V Supported (card supplied with Ångström)	microSD card Supported (card supplied with Ångström)	256MB NAND Flash, SD/MMC card
Onboard network:	?	Gigabit Ethernet, single-pair Ethernet, 802.11n 2.4/5 GHz WiFi, Bluetooth LE, IEEE 802.15.4	?	Gigabit Ethernet, 802.11AC 2.4/5 GHz WiFi	—N/a	Dual Gigabit Ethernet	Fast Ethernet (MII based)	Fast Ethernet (MII based)	Fast Ethernet (via USB hub with Ethernet)	—N/a
USB ports:	?	1x USB Type C dual-role, 1x USB Type A host	?	1x USB Type C dual-role, 1x USB Type A host	1x Micro USB Type B	3x USB 3.0 Type A Host; 4 x USB 2.0 Host; 1 x Micro USB Type B	1x Standard A host port (direct). 1x mini B device port (direct)	1x Standard A host port (direct). 1x mini B device port (via hub)	4x Standard A host port (via hub with Ethernet). 1x mini AB OTG port (direct)	1x Standard A host port (direct). 1x mini AB OTG port (direct)
Memory (SDRAM):	4096 MiB LPDDR4	2048 MiB DDR4	4096 MiB LPDDR4	1024 MiB DDR3L	512 MiB DDR3	2048 MiB DDR3L	512 MiB DDR3	256 MiB DDR2	512 MiB DDR2	128 MiB (rev B) DDR; 256 MiB (rev C+) DDR
Video outputs:	?	HDMI	?	Micro-HDMI	none	HDMI, LCD via Expansion	Micro-HDMI, cape add-ons	cape add-ons	DVI-D, S-Video	
Audio outputs:	?	HDMI	?	Micro-HDMI	none	HDMI, AIC3104 (Stereo In/out)	Micro-HDMI, cape add-ons	cape add-ons	3.5mm audio jack	
Size:	?	80 mm × 80 mm × 20 mm (3.15 in × 3.15 in × 0.79 in)	?	8.9 cm x 5.4 cm x 1.5 cm	56mm x 35mm x 5mm	107 mm × 102 mm (4.2 in × 4.0 in)	86.40 mm × 53.3 mm (3.402 in × 2.098 in)	86.40 mm × 53.3 mm (3.402 in × 2.098 in)	78.74 mm × 76.2 mm (3.100 in × 3.000 in)	78.74 mm × 76.2 mm (3.100 in × 3.000 in)
Weight:	?	55.3 grams (1.95 ounces)	?	48 grams (1.7 ounces)	10 grams (0.35 ounces)	TBA	39.68 g (1.400 oz)	39.68 grams (1.400 ounces)	?	?
Power ratings:	?	3.77 A @ 5 V	?	3A @ 5V	150 mA @ 5 V	210–460 mA @5 V	210–460 mA @5 V	300–500 mA @5 V	?	350-1000 mA @5 V
Power source:	?	USB C Port	?	USB C Port	micro USB port or I/O pins	2.5 mm × 5.5 mm 12 V jack	Mini USB or 2.1 mm x 5.5 mm 5 V jack			
Low-level peripherals:	?	?	?	4+xUART, 16-bit LCD, 2x SPI, 2× I²C	3xUART, 4× PWM, 2× SPI, 2× I²C, 2x CAN bus	7xUART, LCD, GPMC, 1× SPI, 1x I²C, 1x CAN bus	4xUART, 8× PWM, LCD, GPMC, MMC1, 2× SPI, 2× I²C, A/D Converter, 2× CAN bus, 4 Timers	4xUART, 8× PWM, LCD, GPMC, MMC1, 2× SPI, 2× I²C, A/D Converter, 2× CAN bus, 4 Timers, FTDI USB to serial, JTAG via USB	McBSP, DSS, I²C, UART, LCD, McSPI, PWM, JTAG, camera interface	McBSP, DSS, I²C, UART, McSPI, PWM, JTAG

The following operating systems are reported to have obtained support for the hardware used on the boards: Fedora, Android (code named rowboat), Ubuntu, Void Linux, openSUSE and Ångström. The board also supports other OSes such as FreeBSD, NetBSD, OpenBSD, QNX, MINIX 3, RISC OS, and Windows Embedded.

== Optional expansion boards ==
- BeagleBoard Zippy – Feature expander daughter card for BeagleBoard
- BeagleBoard Zippy2 – Second-generation Zippy. (UART, EEPROM, 100BASE-T, SD-Slot, RTC, I²C (5 V))
- BeagleTouch Display – Touchscreen 4.3" OLED panel with touchscreen, and drivers for Angstrom Linux built by Liquidware.
- BeagleLCD2 Expansion Board – 4.3" wide aspect LCD panel + touchscreen with interface board. Developed by HY Research.
- BeagleJuice – Lithium-ion battery pack for portability developed and built by Liquidware.
- WLAN adapter – This additional expansion card enables wireless connectivity functionality for the BeagleBoard.
- BeadaFrame – 7" TFT LCD kit includes a touch panel and a plastic frame, by NAXING Electronics.
- 4DLCD CAPE – 4.3", 480x272 resolution LCD cape with resistive touch or non-touch and seven push buttons
- Vifff-024 – a very sensitive camera allowing capture of video stream at quarter moon illumination. Developed by ViSensi.org.

== Optional enclosures ==
- Beagle Board RevC Clear Acrylic Case – Case for a BeagleBoard alone. (without Zippy2)
- BeagleLCD2 Clear Acrylic Case – Case for BeagleBoard with BeagleLCD2

== Clones ==
- IGEPv2 – a slightly larger board that includes more RAM, built-in Bluetooth and Wi-Fi, a USB host, an Ethernet jack, and use microSD cards instead of regular SD cards.
- ICETEK Mini Board (Chinese)

== See also ==
- Open-source computing hardware
- IOIO
