= Pace plc =

Broadband cable company

- Type: Subsidiary
- Traded as: LSE: PIC; OTC Gray: PCMXF
- Industry: Information technology
- Founded: 1982; 44 years ago
- Founder: David Hood; Barry Rubery; Robert Fleming
- Fate: Acquired by Arris Group
- Headquarters: Saltaire, West Yorkshire, England
- Key people: Allan Leighton (chairman); Mike Pulli (CEO)
- Products: set-top boxes, media servers, residential gateways, Elements software platform, ECO service management, optical networking
- Revenue: $2,620.0 million (2014)
- Operating income: $180.9 million (2014)
- Net income: $148.0 million (2014)
- Website: www.pace.com

Pace plc was a British company which developed set-top boxes (STBs), advanced residential gateways, software and services for the pay-TV and broadband services industry. Pace's customers included cable, telco, satellite and IPTV operators. The company was listed on the London Stock Exchange until December 2015, when the company received the last of the regulatory clearances needed to allow a merger with Arris Group to proceed. In 2019, Arris was subsequently acquired by network infrastructure provider CommScope.

== History ==
The company was founded by Yorkshire born businessmen Barry Rubery, David Hood and Robert Fleming in 1982, taking the name Pace Micro Supplies in 1983, eventually being renamed to Pace Micro Technology plc in 1987. It introduced the first low cost commercially available modems in 1985. In 1987, it started selling its first analogue satellite set top receivers. In 1996, it introduced the world's first DVB decoders, for Australian satellite company Galaxy.

Pace was floated on the London Stock Exchange in 1996. In 1998, the company started shipping digital satellite television equipment for BSkyB. In January 1999, Pace purchased the set top box division of Acorn Computers, and converted it into its office in Cambridge. In the following years, Pace owned the operating system RISC OS, and used technologies based on it in its decoder equipment. The office in Cambridge was closed in March 2003. With Pace focusing on the digital television market, Pace's modem business had been separated from the parent company as the result of a management buy-out, but this new company, PMC Electronics, was placed into receivership in August 1999.

Pace started delivering products to Comcast in the United States in June 2000; the company also delivers to AT&T and DirecTV. In 2001, Pace announced that it was outsourcing the last of the manufacturing capacity which remained at its location in Saltaire: the head office was reduced to an administration and development centre.

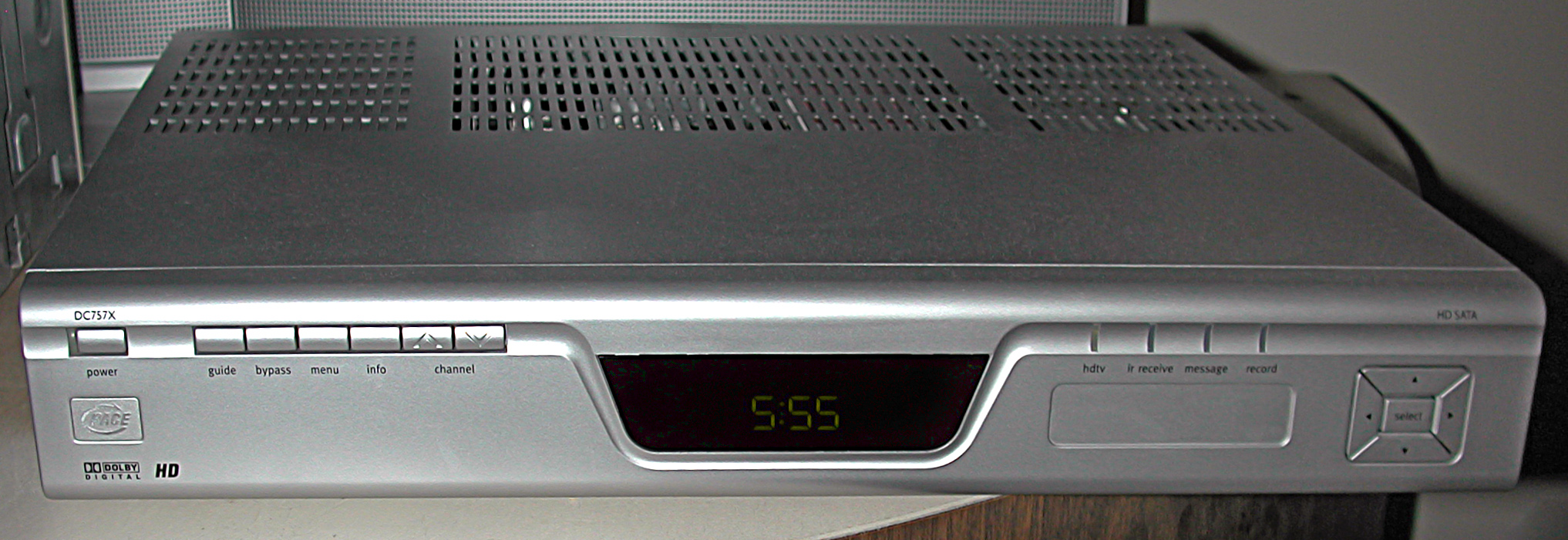
Pace Micro Technology DC757X Set top box

In March 2002, Pace became the first company to market free-to-view personal video recorders (PVRs). In February 2005, Pace in conjunction with Australian subscription television provider Foxtel launched the first DVB-C PVR. In April 2006, Neil Gaydon became CEO, taking over from John Dyson, and Mike McTighe became the chairman, taking over from Sir Michael Bett.

In April 2008, Pace acquired the 'Set-Top Box and Connectivity Solutions' division of Royal Philips Electronics, approximately doubling the size of the company. In May 2008, Pace changed its name from Pace Micro Technology plc to Pace plc.

In July 2010, Pace acquired home networking equipment maker 2Wire, which was based in the United States, IP and Cable specialist, Bewan Systems SA and pay television software specialist, Latens Systems. In June 2011, Allan Leighton became chairman. In December 2011, Neil Gaydon was replaced as CEO by Mike Pulli, formerly president of Pace Americas

A significant milestone was reached in 2012, when Pace sold its one hundred millionth digital set top box. In January 2014, Pace completed the acquisition of Aurora Networks, a leading developer and manufacturer of advanced, next generation optical transport and access network solutions for broadband networks.

On 22 April 2015, the Boards of Pace and Arris Group announced that they had reached agreement on the terms of a recommended combination of Pace with Arris, in a stock and cash deal that valued Pace at UKP £1.4Bn (US$2.1Bn). The combination was conditional on, amongst other things, shareholder approval from both Pace and Arris shareholders and also the receipt of merger control clearances in a number of jurisdictions including Brazil, Colombia, Germany, Portugal, South Africa and the United States.

The company received the last of the regulatory clearances needed to allow the merger to proceed in December 2015. The acquisition was completed on 4 January 2016. The resultant combined group is incorporated in the United Kingdom, but operationally managed from the United States, and is owned 24% by Pace shareholders and 76% by Arris shareholders.

== Operations ==
Pace's head office was in Saltaire, near Bradford in West Yorkshire. It occupied a large proportion of the Victorian textile mill complex called Salt's Mill. The company had major operations in the United States, France and India, as well as the United Kingdom HQ.

== See also ==
- Cisco Systems
- Inview
