= AAE =

AAE may refer to:

== Aviation ==
- Above aerodrome elevation, an altitude given as above the nearest aerodrome or airport
- Académie de l'air et de l'espace, the French national Air and Space Academy
- Armée de l'Air et de l'Espace (French Air and Space Force)
- Accredited Airport Executive, a professional certification from the American Association of Airport Executives
- Australian airExpress, a cargo airline based in Melbourne, Australia
- Rabah Bitat Airport in Annaba, Annaba Province, Algeria (IATA airport code AAE)
- Xpress Air (ICAO airline designator) in the US

== Languages ==
- African-American English, a linguistic variety spoken by many African Americans
- Australian Aboriginal English, varieties of English used by many Aboriginal Australians
- Arbëresh language, a language of Italy

== Organizations ==
- Actuarial Association of Europe
- American Association of Endodontists, a professional organization
- Association of American Educators, a nonprofit nonunion professional teachers association
- Australasian Antarctic Expedition

== Other uses ==
- Abu Ali Express, website and Telegram channel
- Acetylajmaline esterase, an enzyme
- Acquired angioedema, a rare medical condition (C1 esterase inhibitor deficiency)
- Adobe After Effects, digital motion graphics and visual effects software
- ARM Accredited Engineer program, an accreditation program for software developers
- Academy for Academic Excellence, a K-12 public charter school located in California
- All About Eve, a 1950 American drama film
