= SolidRun =

Israeli hardware developer

SolidRun Ltd.
- Industry: Internet of things, Embedded systems, edge computing
- Founded: 2010
- Headquarters: Acre, Israel
- Area served: International
- Key people: Atai Ziv (CEO); Rabeeh Khoury (CTO); Kossay Omary (Co-founder)
- Products: Various SOMs, COMs & SBCs, including HummingBoard, CuBox, ClearFog & SolidPC
- Website: solid-run.com

SolidRun is an Israeli company producing and developing embedded and Networking systems components, mainly mini computers, Single-board computers, System-on-module, computer-on-module, Edge servers and Industrial PCs devices. It provides OEMs powerful application-ready compute and networking motherboards platforms based on open architecture to save time and lower infrastructure costs, such as the HummingBoard.

Situated in Acre, Israel, SolidRun develops and manufactures products aimed both for the private entertainment sector, and for companies developing processor based products, notably components of "Internet of Things" technology systems.

Within the scope of the Industrial IoT technology, SolidRun's products are aimed to cover the intermediate sphere, between sensors and user devices, and between the larger network or Cloud framework. Within such a network, industrial computers or system-on-module devices act as mediators gathering and processing information from sensors or user devices and communicating with the network - this is also known as Edge computing.

== History ==
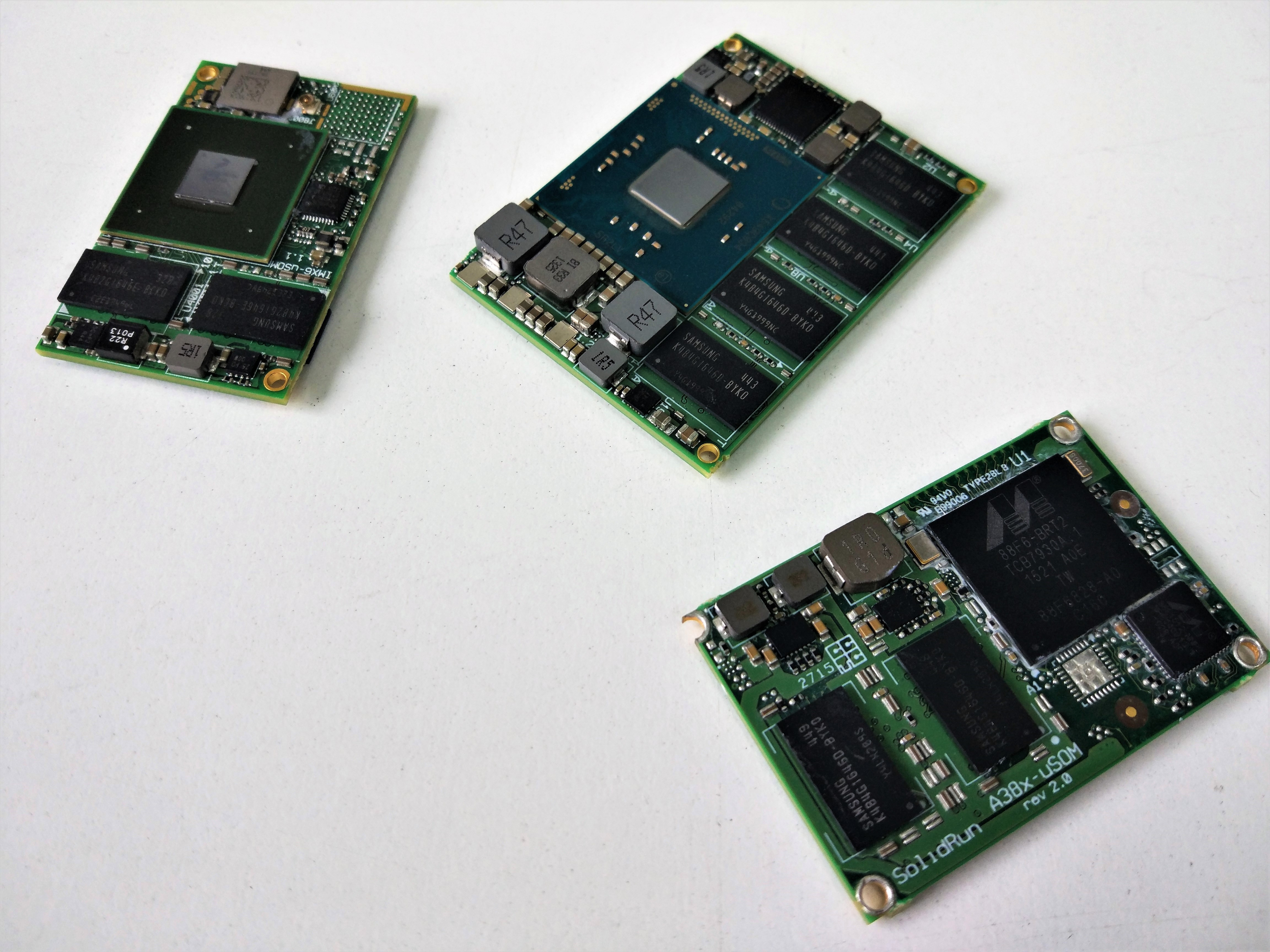
Three of SolidRun's MicroSOMs from the i.MX6, Intel Braswell & Marvell ARMADA product families.

SolidRun was founded in 2010 by Rabeeh Khoury, formerly an engineer at Marvell Technology Group, and Kossay Omary. The company initially focused on developing compact embedded computing platforms and components for integration into Internet of Things (IoT) and embedded systems.

SolidRun is headquartered in Acre, Israel, and is led by CEO Dr. Atai Ziv.

The company's early product development included the CuBox family of compact computers, with the first CuBox announced in 2011. The product line was later expanded with the CuBox-i series and other compact computing platforms targeting embedded and consumer applications. SolidRun also introduced the HummingBoard family, a modular single-board computer platform designed to host SolidRun System-on-Modules (SoMs) and provide a flexible development platform for embedded applications.

Over time, SolidRun expanded its product portfolio to include System-on-Modules (SoMs), carrier boards, single-board computers, networking platforms, and industrial computing solutions. Product families include HummingBoard, ClearFog, HoneyComb, CuBox, and other embedded platforms supporting processor architectures from multiple semiconductor vendors, including NXP, Marvell, Renesas, AMD, and others.

SolidRun develops and supports its products using open-source software technologies, including Linux-based operating systems and open-source development tools, and participates in the open-source hardware and software communities.

== IoT and industrial products ==
=== SOMs ===
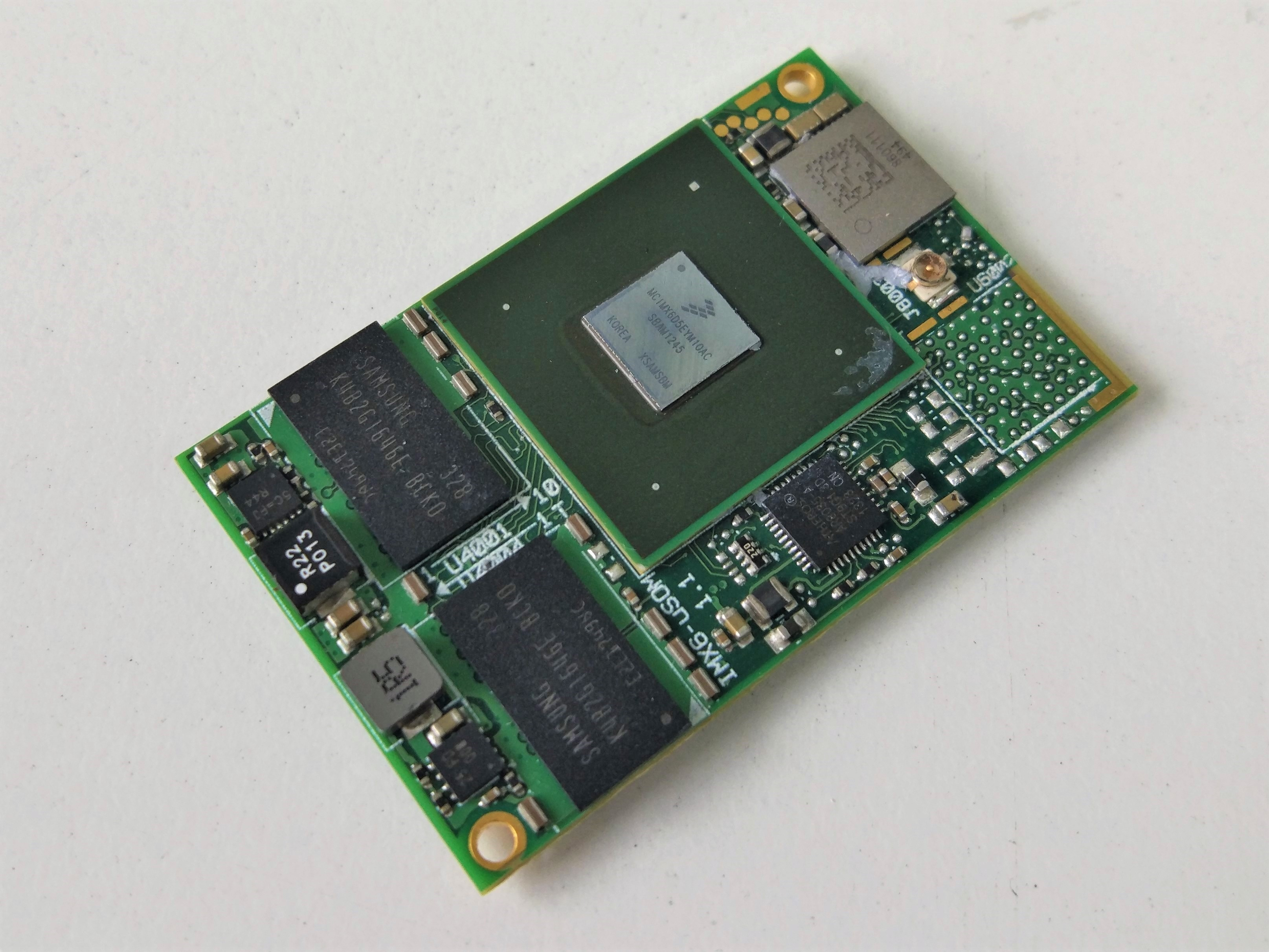
The i.MX6-based System-on-Module.

A compact system-on-module ARM based processing board, with a Freescale i.MX 6 system-on-chip & networking, power management and storage capabilities. At 47 mm × 30 mm (1.9 in × 1.2 in), the MicroSoM is aimed for device and system developing, as an all rounded modular processing component.

The SOM varies between 4 models ranging in performance, especially in regard to processing. The Single-core and Dual-Light-core SOMs house a Vivante GC880 GPU, 10/100 Mbit/s Ethernet network connection and a 2 Lane CSI camera interface port. The Single-core variant holds 32-bit DDR3, 512 MB memory, while the Dual-light variant holds 64-bit DDR3, 1 GB memory.
The Dual-core and Quad-core SOM's house a Vivante GC2000 GPU, 10/100/1000 Mbit/s Ethernet network connection and a 4 Lane CSI camera interface port, they also include a built in 802.1 b/g/n wireless and a 4.0 Bluetooth port. Both variants offer 64-bit DDR3 memory at a 1066 Mbit/s speed, the dual-core coming with 1 GB of memory, while the Quad-core comes with 2 GB of memory.

Models & specifications:

	SOM i1	SOM i2	SOM i2ex	SOM i4Pro
SoC	i.MX6 Solo	i.MX6 Dual Lite	i.MX6 Dual	i.MX6 Quad
Processor	Single core ARM A9; 1 GHz (up to 1.2 GHz)	Dual core ARM A9; 1 GHz (up to 1.2 GHz)	Dual core ARM A9; 1 GHz (up to 1.2 GHz)	Quad core ARM A9; 1 GHz (up to 1.2 GHz)
Memory	32 bit, 512 MB DDR3 @ 800 Mbit/s	64 bit, 1 GB DDR3 @ 800 Mbit/s	64 bit, 1 GB DDR3 @ 1066 Mbit/s	64 bit, 2 GB DDR3 @ 1066 Mbit/s
GPU	Vivante GC880	Vivante GC880	Vivante GC2000	Vivante GC2000
Dimensions	47 mm × 30 mm	47 mm × 30 mm	47 mm × 30 mm	47 mm × 30 mm

- TI AM64x Sitara

=== CuBox-i & CuBox-M ===
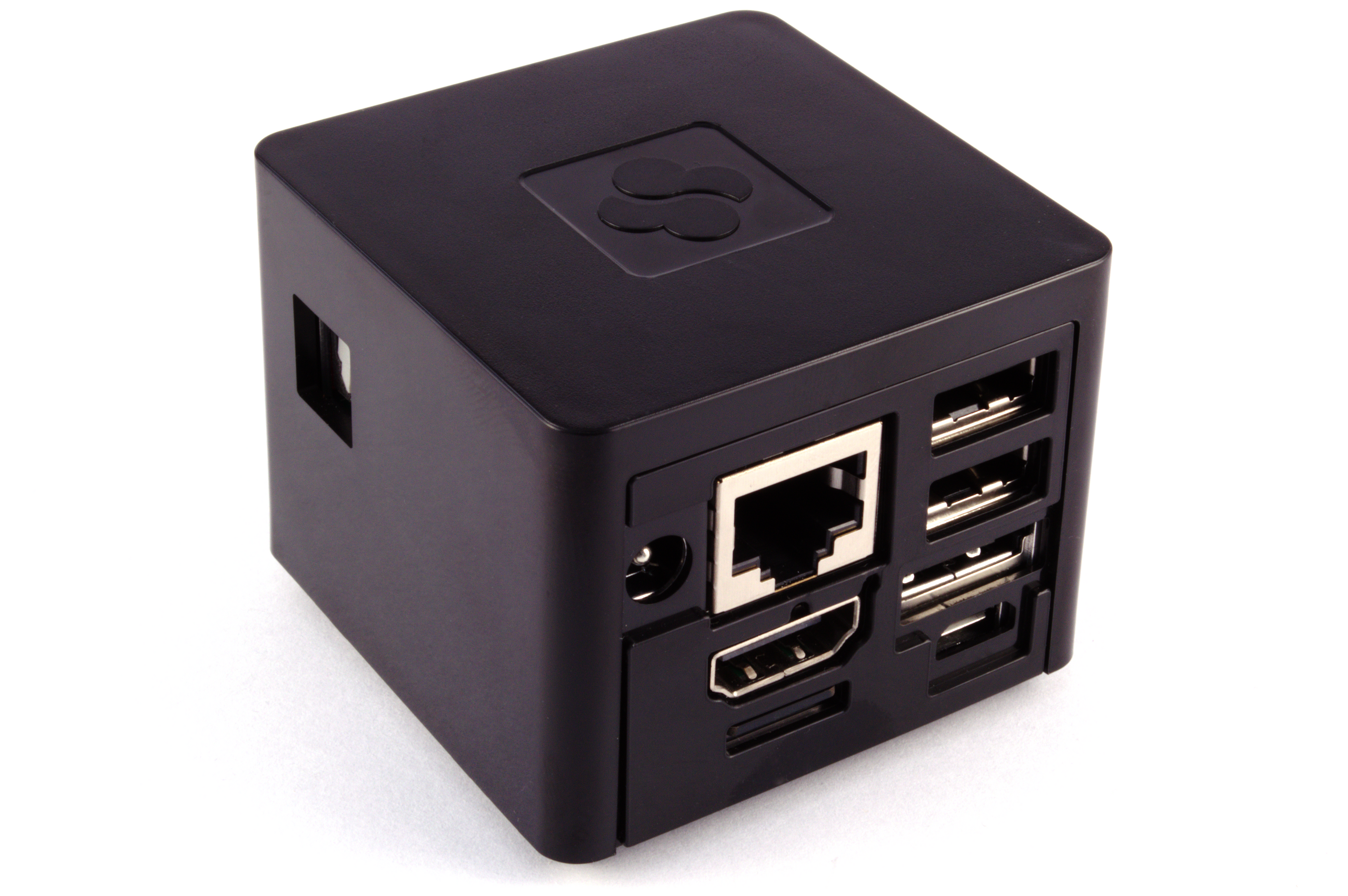
A CuBox-i quad-core variant housing a Freescale I.MX6 Microprocessor.

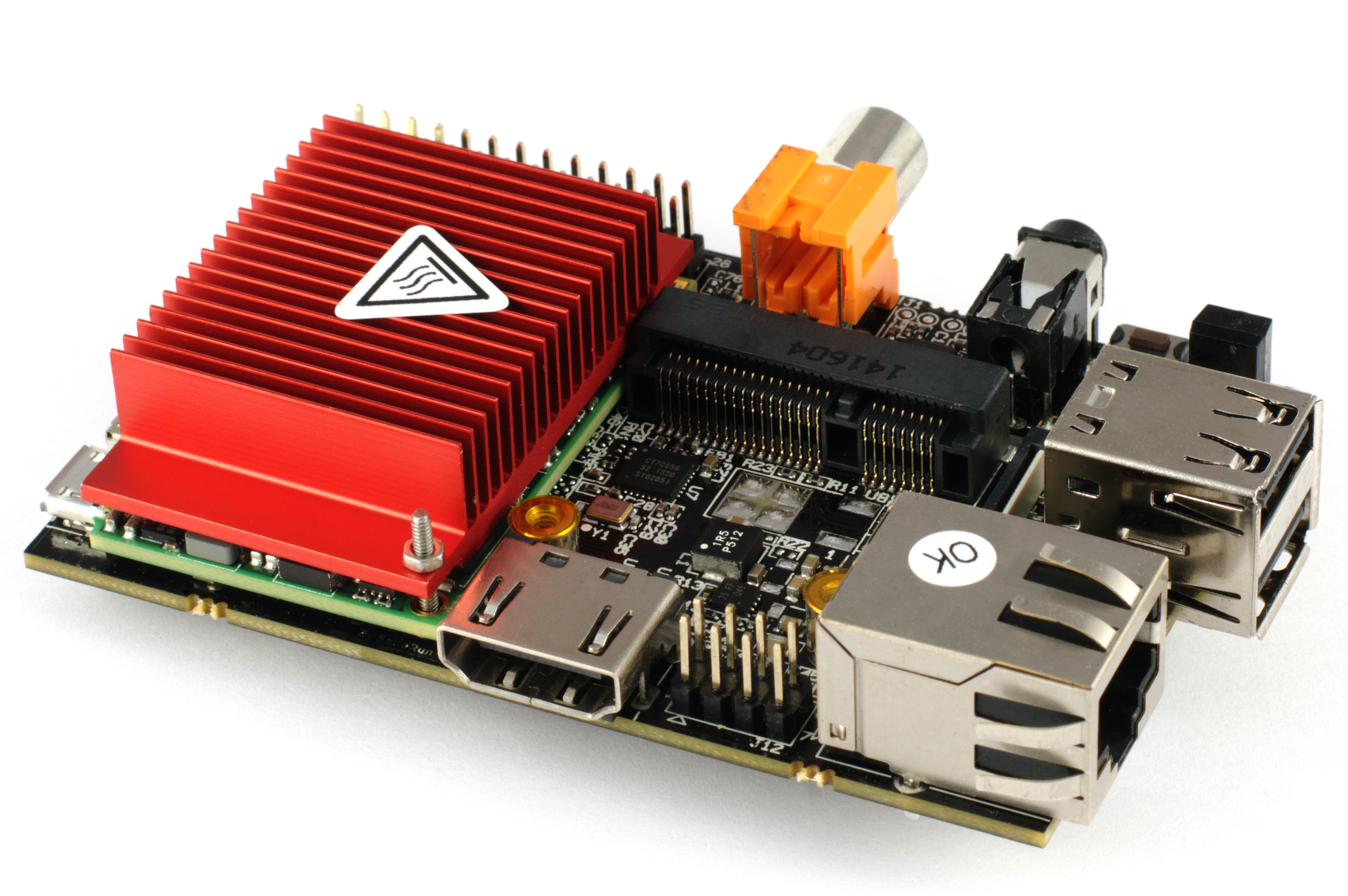
The HummingBoard i.MX6-based computer-on-module.

Announced in December 2011, CuBox and CuBox-i are a series of fanless nettop-class mini computers, all cube shaped and approximate 2 × 2 × 2 inches in size, weighing around 91 g (3.2 oz).

The first generation CuBox was a low-power ARM architecture CPU based computer, using the Marvell Armada 510 (88AP510) SoC with an ARM v6/v7-compliant superscalar processor core, Vivante GC600 OpenGL 3.0 and OpenGL ES 2.0 capable 2D/3D graphics processing unit, Marvell vMeta HD Video Decoder hardware engine, and TrustZone security extensions, Cryptographic Engines and Security Accelerator (CESA) co-processor.

In November 2013, SolidRun released a family of CuBox-i computers initially named CuBox-i1, i2, i2eX, and i4Pro, containing a range of different i.MX6 processors by Freescale Semiconductor.

A further development in the family, CuBoxTV was announced in December 2014 as a mid-range CuBox-i SOM device designed to run Kodi on an OpenELEC Operating system, developed for the home entertainment market. CuBoxTV was based on an ARM architecture Quad core CPU, 1 GB, 64 bit memory, GC2000 GPU with an OpenGL ES quad shader, and a host of video, audio and picture decoders and encoders supporting all major file type. The device has a number of connection ports including HDMI, 10/100/1000 Ethernet, USB 2.0, eSATA and optical audio.

=== HummingBoard ===
A compact computer-on-module ARM-based mini computer, running an i.MX6 or iMX8M SoC. HummingBoard is marketed as a modular fanless mini computer, to be integrated with larger networks or systems, especially in the area of IoT development.

	HummingBoard Base/Pro	HummingBoard Gate	HummingBoard Edge	HummingBoard Pulse
SOM model	i.MX6 Single/Dual/Quad core	i.MX6 Single/Dual/Quad core	i.MX6 Single/Dual/Quad core	i.MX8M Dual/Quad core
Dimensions	85 mm × 56 mm	102 mm × 69 mm	102 mm × 69 mm	102 mm × 69 mm
Voltage in	5 V	7 V – 36 V	7 V – 36 V	7 V – 36 V, PoE
RTC	no/on board (RTC battery off board)	on board (RTC battery socket/header)	on board (RTC battery socket/header)	
Back to back connectors	2	3	3	3
LVDS display out	no/yes	no	yes	???
SATA II	no/mSATA Full Size	no	M.2 2242	M.2
PCI express 2.0	no/mPCIe – Half Size	mPCIe – Half & Full Size	mPCIe – Half & Full Size	mPCIe – Half & Full Size
Infrared remote control receiver	no/yes	no	yes	yes
MikroBUS Click Board support	no	yes	no	
Enclosure	no	optional	optional	optional

== Networking products ==
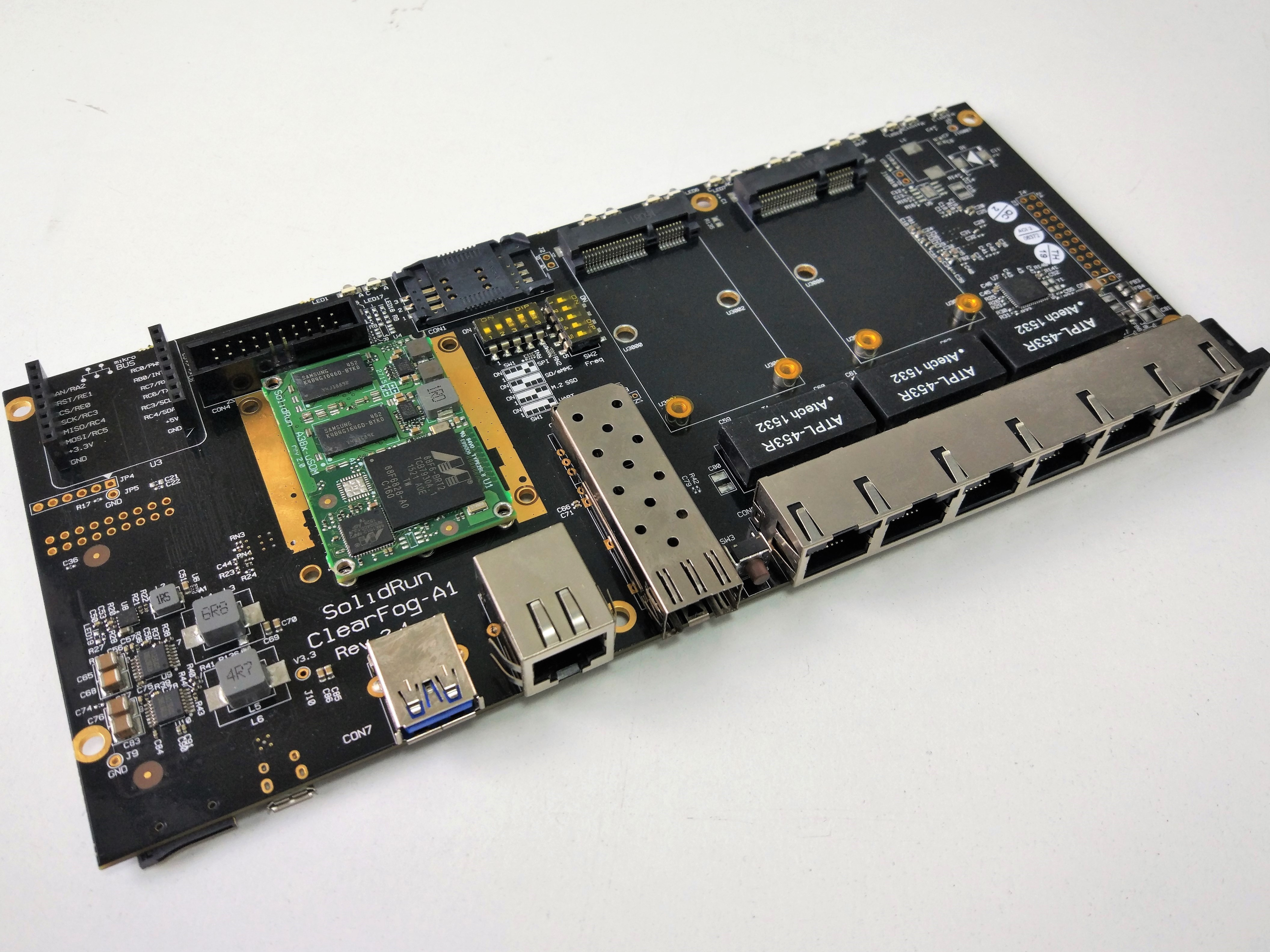
ClearFog Pro, based on the ARMADA 38x SoC with the MicroSoM clearly visible on the left side.

=== Marvell ARMADA A388 family ===
A388 SOM

Based on the Marvell ARMADA 388 SoC, the SOM features a Dual core ARM Cortex-A9 with 1.6 GHz processing power (up to 1.3 GHz in industrial grade), and up to 2 GB, 32-bit DDR3L memory. At 30 mm × 50 mm the ARMADA MicroSoM is the basis for a number of SolidRun's products in this product family.

ClearFog A388

Announced in November 2015, SolidRun's ClearFog Single-board computer (SBC) is based on Marvell's Armada 38x ARM Cortex-A9 Dual SoC and is marketed as a modular development integration SBC. The ClearFog is divided into two grades: Base and Pro, differing mainly in connectivity options and size.

The ClearFog is a fanless SBC based on a Marvell ARMADA A388 dual 1.6 GHz core SOM, with 1 GB memory, Mikroelektronika mikroBUS Click Board support, and various connection ports including USB 3.0, mPCIE & Ethernet ports. The Clearfog Pro has a Marvell 88E6176 DSA chip.

=== NXP Layerscape LX2160A family ===
LX2160A COM Express type 7

== See also ==
- Raspberry Pi
- Internet of Things
- Industry 4.0
