= Mikroelektronika =

Time-Saving Embedded Tools

MIKROE
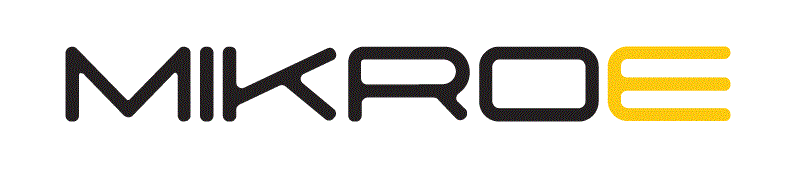
- Company type: Private
- Industry: Embedded Electronics
- Founded: 11 December 2001; 24 years ago (Current form)
- Area served: Worldwide
- Key people: Nebojša Matić (CEO)
- Products: Compilers, Development Boards, Smart Displays, Programmer/Debugger, Peripheral Boards
- Number of employees: 93 (2018)
- Website: www.mikroe.com

MikroElektronika (known by its abbreviation MIKROE) is a Serbian manufacturer and retailer of hardware and software tools for developing embedded systems. The company headquarters is in Belgrade, Serbia.

== History ==
Current company owner and CEO – Nebojša Matić started publishing an electronics magazine called "MikroElektronika" in 1997. In 2001, the magazine was shut down and MikroElektronika repositioned itself as a company focused on producing development boards for microcontrollers and publishing books for developing embedded systems.

The company started offering compilers in 2004, with the release of mikroPascal for PIC and mikroBasic for PIC – compilers for programming 8-bit microcontrollers from Microchip Technology. Between 2004 and 2015 the company released C, Basic and Pascal compilers for seven microcontroller architectures: PIC, PIC32, dsPIC/PIC24, FT90x, AVR, 8051, and ARM® (supporting STMicroelectronics, Texas Instruments and Microchip-based ARM® Cortex microcontrollers).

In conjunction with compilers, MikroElektronika kept its focus on producing development boards while gradually ceasing its publishing activities. Its current generation of the "Easy" boards brand was released in 2012. One of the flagship models, EasyPIC Fusion v7 was nominated for best tool at the Embedded World 2013 exhibition in Nurembeg, an important embedded systems industry gathering. Other product lines were introduced as well, including the "mikroProg" line of hardware programmers and debuggers, and the range of sensor and transceiver add-on boards known as click boards.

During this time span the company developed relationships with various semiconductor vendors and distributors. It became an official partner of Microchip Technology, NXP Semiconductors, Texas Instruments, STMicroelectronics, Imagination Technologies, Telit, Quectel, and U-blox. MikroElektronika also built up its worldwide distributor network by partnering with Digi-Key, Mouser Electronics, Future Electronics, RS Components as well as more than 50 local distributors in all continents.

Responding to rising public interest in the Internet of things, in 2016 MikroElektronika released Hexiwear, a wearable development kit created in partnership with NXP Semiconductors. Hexiwear was funded through Kickstarter. Since its release on the market, it won four industry awards: Best in Show, Reader's Choice, and Best IoT product at ARM TechCon 2016 Innovation Challenge, 2016 ECN Impact award, as well as Best for Rapid Prototyping at the Hackster Maker Madness competition.

== Product lines ==
EasyPIC v7 Development Board is the company's leading brand

Mikromedia Boards are suitable for development of multimedia and graphics applications

MikroProg programmer and In-Circuit Debugger supports over 570 Microchip PIC, dsPIC30/33 and PIC32 microcontrollers

MIKROE's product catalog includes more than 2,500 products. The following table lists its main product lines.

Product line	Description	Representative products
mikroC mikroBasic and mikroPascal compilers	Compilers (with Integrated Development Environment) available for 7 microcontroller architectures (PIC, PIC32, dsPIC/PIC32, FT90x, AVR, 8051, and ARM), notable for having more than 500 built-in function libraries, and integration of GUI design tool for small displays.	mikroC PRO for ARM
Easy boards	Full-featured development boards with onboard programmers. Users can plug different microcontrollers via DIP sockets or specialized PCB cards.	EasyPIC v7 (for 8-bit PIC microcontrollers)
click boards	1600+ add-on boards with a standardized connector and form factor. Each board carries a single sensor or transceiver from numerous vendors.	GSM click LoRa click Weather click
clicker boards	Compact rapid prototyping boards with an embedded microcontroller and basic peripherals along with one or two mikroBUS sockets for Click boards.	clicker 2 for STM32
Ready boards	Mid-size development boards with a plastic casing which make it suitable for use as consumer products once programmed.	Ready for AVR
MINI boards	Small development boards made in DIP-40 form factor, allowing users to add 32-bit processing power to systems originally designed for 8-bit microcontrollers.	MINI-M4 for STM32
mikroProg	USB 2.0 programmers and debuggers supporting various microcontroller families.	mikroProg for PIC, dsPIC, and PIC32
mikromedia boards	TFT touchscreen development boards for prototyping embedded GUIs. Equipped with a microcontroller, graphic driver, and numerous peripherals.	mikromedia Plus for STM32F7
mikromedia HMI boards	TFT boards with optional touchscreen, powered by FTDI Chip microcontrollers and graphic drivers and reduced feature set to make it suitable for use as OEM part.	mikromedia HMI 5 inch capacitive
