= CuBox =

Nettop computer

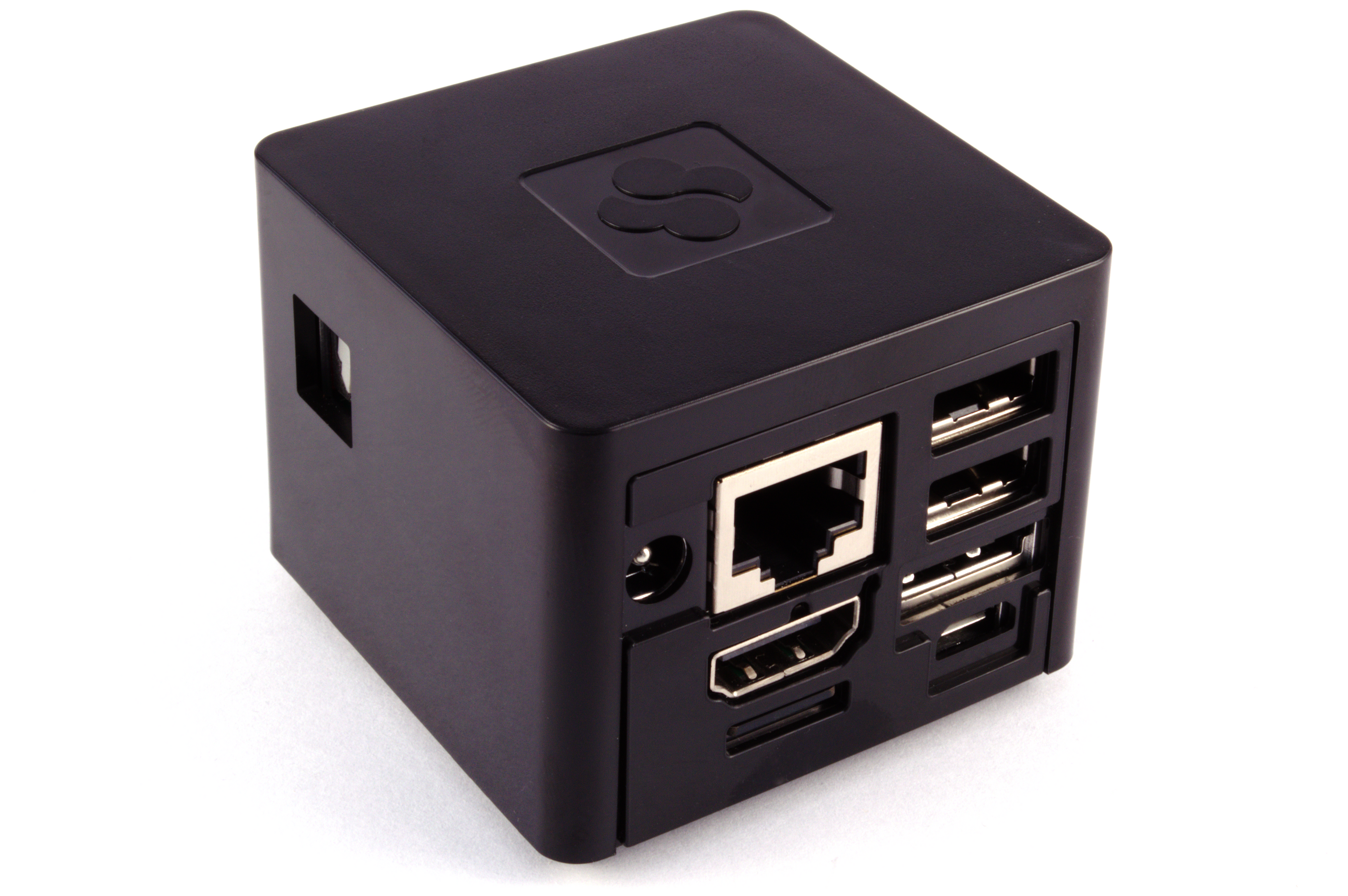
- i.MX6-based CuBox (2014)
- Common manufacturers: Marvell or Freescale Semiconductor
- Design firm: SolidRun
- Introduced: CuBox; 11 December 2011
- Cost: 99 euro (~US$135)
- Type: Single-board computer
- Processor: Marvell Armada 510 ARMv7 or i.MX6
- Frequency: From 800 MHz and upwards
- Memory: From 1 GB and upwards
- Coprocessor: VFPv3 (VFP/FPU); WMMX / WMMX2 SIMD vMeta Video Decoder; Vivante GC600 GPU; Two XOR/DMA Engines and PDMA; TrustZone CESA; PMU (Power Management Unit)
- Ports: HDMI 1.3 with CEC; S/PDIF (optical output); 1000baseT Ethernet; 2 × USB 2.0 host ports 1 × eSATA (3 Gbit/sec); IrDA (InfraRed) receiver MicroUSB (console only); MicroSD slot (comes with 2 GB MicroSD SDXC, upgradable to 64 GB)
- Power consumption: 3 W @ 5 V, 2 A DC
- Weight: ~91 g
- Dimensions: 55 × 55 × 42 mm

CuBox and CuBox-i are series of small and fanless nettop-class computers manufactured by the Israeli company SolidRun Ltd. They are all cube-shaped and sized at approximately 2 × 2 × 2 inches (5 cm) and weigh 91 grams (0.2 lb, or 3.2 oz). CuBox was first announced in December 2011 and began shipping in January 2012, initially being marketed as a cheap open-source developer platform for embedded systems.

The first-generation CuBox was according to SolidRun the first commercially available desktop computer based on the Marvell Armada 500-series SoC (System-on-Chip) and at the time was said to be the world's smallest desktop computer.

In November 2013, SolidRun released the Cubox-i1, i2, i2eX, and i4Pro, containing i.MX6 processors.

== Overview ==
CuBox is a low-power computer based on ARM-architecture CPU, using the Marvell Armada 510 (88AP510) SoC with an ARM v6/v7-compliant superscalar processor core, Vivante GC600 OpenGL 3.0 and OpenGL ES 2.0 capable 2D/3D graphics processing unit, Marvell vMeta HD Video Decoder hardware engine, and TrustZone security extensions, Cryptographic Engines and Security Accelerator (CESA) co-processor.

Despite being about 2-inch-square in size, the platform can stream and decode 1080p content, use desktop-class interfaces such as KDE or GNOME under Linux, while requiring less than 3 watts and less than 1 watt in standby.

SolidRun currently officially only supports Linux kernel 2.6.x or later and Android 2.2.x and later. It comes with Ubuntu Desktop 10.04 and Android 2.2 dual-boot pre-installed.

== Newer models ==
In November 2013, SolidRun released a family of CuBox-i computers named CuBox-i1, i2, i2eX, and i4Pro, containing a range of different i.MX6 processors by Freescale Semiconductor.

They have also released a series of caseless i.MX6 models called the Hummingboard.

== CuBoxTV ==
Announced in December 2014, CuBoxTV is a mid-range and simplified version of the CuBox-i computer and runs the RISC-OS operating system although is designed to operate KODI (formerly known as XBMC) on an OpenELEC operating system.

CuBoxTV weighs approximately 9.9 ounces (280 g), and is around 2X2 Inches wide and 1.8 inches high, shaped like a cube with rounded sides. It features an i.MX6 Quad core processor at a 1GHz speed, 1GB of RAM memory, 8GB base storage memory and a GC2000 OpenGL quad shader GPU. It houses a couple of USB 2.0 ports, a HDMI port, microSD port and an Ethernet port.

== See also ==
- ARM architecture
- Home theater PC
- Industrial PC
- Single-board computer
