= RTXC Quadros =

RTXC Quadros is a real time operating system (RTOS) written mainly in the C programming language. It is mainly intended for use in embedded systems.

The RTXC RTOS was originally developed by AT Barrett and Associates in the 1970s. It is currently maintained by Quadros Systems, Inc., of Houston, Texas.

RTXC Quadros comes with a tracing tool which give insight in the runtime dynamics and timing, RTXCview.
