= Acetylajmaline esterase =

Class of enzymes

Identifiers
- EC no.: 3.1.1.80
- CAS no.: 110183-46-5

Databases
- IntEnz: IntEnz view
- BRENDA: BRENDA entry
- ExPASy: NiceZyme view
- KEGG: KEGG entry
- MetaCyc: metabolic pathway
- PRIAM: profile
- PDB structures: RCSB PDB PDBe PDBsum
Search
- PMC: articles
- PubMed: articles
- NCBI: proteins

The enzyme acetylajmaline esterase (EC 3.1.1.80, AAE, 2β(R)-17-O-acetylajmalan:acetylesterase, acetylajmalan esterase; systematic name 17-O-acetylajmaline O-acetylhydrolase) catalyses the following reactions:

(1) 17-O-acetylajmaline + H_{2}O $\rightleftharpoons$ ajmaline + acetate
(2) 17-O-acetylnorajmaline + H_{2}O $\rightleftharpoons$ norajmaline + acetate

This plant enzyme mediates the last stages in the biosynthesis of the indole alkaloid ajmaline.
