= ARM DevSummit =

Information technology conference

- Frequency: Annually
- Venue: 2004–2017: Santa Clara Convention Center; 2018–2019: San Jose Convention Center; 2020–2021: Digital (presented online due to COVID-19 pandemic); 2022: Digital
- Locations: 2004–2017: Santa Clara, California; 2018–19: San Francisco, California; 2020–2022: Digital
- Country: United States
- Inaugurated: 2004
- Most recent: October 26, 2022
- Organizer: Arm (company)
- Website: devsummit.arm.com

The Arm DevSummit (previously DevCon and Arm TechCon) is usually a three-day information technology conference held annually in October by Arm. The event is used to showcase new hardware, software and technologies using ARM processors. Arm DevSummit is also an event hosted for third-party software developers that work with ARM-powered devices.

The first ever DevCon was held in 2004.

Arm DevSummit was hosted as online-only conferences in 2020 and 2021 due to the COVID-19 pandemic, and in 2022 went fully virtual. There was no event in 2023.

== History ==
Timeline of events
Year	Dates	Venue
2004	October	Santa Clara Convention Center
2005	?	Santa Clara Convention Center
2006	?	Santa Clara Convention Center
2007	?	Santa Clara Convention Center
2008	October 7–9	Santa Clara Convention Center
2009	October 23	Santa Clara Convention Center
2010	November 9–11	Santa Clara Convention Center
2011	October 25–27	Santa Clara Convention Center
2012	October 30–November 1	Santa Clara Convention Center
2013	October 29–31	Santa Clara Convention Center
2014	October 1–3	Santa Clara Convention Center
2015	November 10–12	Santa Clara Convention Center
2016	October 25–27	Santa Clara Convention Center
2017	October 24–26	Santa Clara Convention Center
2018	October 16–18	San Jose McEnery Convention Center
2019	October 8–10	San Jose McEnery Convention Center
2020	October 6–8	Digital
2021	October 19–21	Digital
2022	October 26–November 9	Digital

=== 2000s ===
==== 2004 ====
DevCon 2004, with the tag line "The Evolution of the Digital World", was held circa October 2004 at the Santa Clara Convention Center, California.

==== 2008 ====
DevCon 2008 was held from October 7 to October 9, 2008 at the Santa Clara Convention Center, California.

==== 2009 ====
Arm TechCon 2009, stylized as Arm TechCon_{3}, with the tag line "Design to the Power of Three", was held on October 23, 2009 at the Santa Clara Convention Center, California.

=== 2010s ===
==== 2010 ====
Arm TechCon 2010, with the tag line "The Core of Your Future", was held from November 9 to November 11, 2010 at the Santa Clara Convention Center, California.

==== 2011 ====
Arm TechCon 2011, with the tag line "Join the Community Defining the Future", was held from October 25 to October 27, 2011 at the Santa Clara Convention Center, California.

==== 2012 ====
Arm TechCon 2012 was held from October 30 to November 1, 2011 at the Santa Clara Convention Center, California.

==== 2013 ====
Arm TechCon 2013, with the tag line "Where Intelligence Connects", was held from October 29 to October 31, 2013 at the Santa Clara Convention Center, California.

==== 2014 ====
Arm TechCon 2014 was held from October 1 to October 3, 2014 at the Santa Clara Convention Center, California.

==== 2015 ====
Arm TechCon 2015 was held from November 10 to November 12, 2015 at the Santa Clara Convention Center, California.

==== 2016 ====
Arm TechCon 2016 was held from October 25 to October 27, 2016 at the Santa Clara Convention Center, California.

==== 2017 ====
Arm TechCon 2017, with the tag line "Tackling the challenges of securing a trillion connected devices", was held from October 24 to October 26, 2017 at the Santa Clara Convention Center, California.

==== 2018 ====
Arm TechCon 2018, with the tag line "Arm to reveal details on the 5G, cloud and IoT infrastructures for a trillion connected devices", was held from October 16 to October 18, 2018 at the San Jose Convention Center, California.

==== 2019 ====
Arm TechCon 2019, with the tag line "Showcasing the New Era of Total Compute", was held from October 8 to October 10, 2019 at the San Jose McEnery Convention Center, California.

=== 2020s ===
==== 2020 ====
Arm DevSummit 2020 was held from October 5 to October 9, 2020 as an online-only conference due to the COVID-19 pandemic.

==== 2021 ====
Arm DevSummit 2021, with the tag line "Where Hardware and Software Join Forces", was held from October 19 to October 21, 2021 as an online-only conference due to the COVID-19 pandemic.

==== 2022 ====
Arm DevSummit 2022, with the tag line "Build Your Future on Arm", was held from October 26 to November 9, 2022 as an online developer event with live workshops on the last two days.

== See also ==
- Google I/O
- Microsoft Build
- Nvidia GTC
- WWDC
