= Compartmentalization (engineering) =

When referring to engineering, compartmentalization is the general technique of separating two or more parts of a system to prevent malfunctions from spreading between or among them.

This entails the breaking up of a project or problem into sub classes and sub categories, with the intention of simplifying the task at hand, or to efficiently distribute it amongst a number of teams or people.
