= Non-recurring engineering =

One-time cost to develop a new product

Non-recurring engineering (NRE) cost refers to the one-time cost to research, design, develop and test a new product or product enhancement. When budgeting for a new product, NRE must be considered to analyze if a new product will be profitable. Even though a company will pay for NRE on a project only once, NRE costs can be prohibitively high and the product will need to sell well enough to produce a return on the initial investment. NRE is unlike production costs, which must be paid constantly to maintain production of a product. It is a form of fixed cost in economics terms. Once a system is designed, any number of units can be manufactured without increasing NRE cost.

NRE can be also budgeted and paid via another commercial term called royalty fee. The royalty fee could be a percentage of sales revenue or profit or combination of these two, which have to be incorporated in a mid to long term agreement between technology supplier and the OEM.

In a project-type (manufacturing) company, large parts (possibly all) of the project represent NRE. In this case the NRE costs are likely to be included in the first project's costs, this can also be called research and development (R&D). If the firm cannot recover these costs, it must consider funding part of these from reserves, possibly take a project loss, in the hope that the investment can be recovered from further profit on future projects.

NRE can also be explained as engineering service. Non-recurring engineering (NRE) refers to professional services activities associated with the initial development, design, and implementation of a product or system. These services typically include:

- Planning and project management
- Configuration and customization
- Modification of existing designs or systems
- Integration of components or subsystems
- Engineering and design work
- Quality assurance and testing

NRE activities are generally one-time efforts that occur during the development phase, as opposed to recurring costs associated with ongoing production or maintenance. In industries such as semiconductor manufacturing or automotive engineering, NRE often covers costs related to tooling, prototyping, and initial validation of hardware or software solutions.

The concept of full product NRE as described above may lead readers to believe that NRE expenses are unnecessarily high. However, focused NRE wherein small amounts of NRE money can yield large returns by making existing product changes is an option to consider as well. A small adjustment to an existing assembly may be considered, in order to use a less expensive or improved subcomponent or to replace a subcomponent which is no longer available. In the world of embedded firmware, NRE may be invested in code development to fix problems or to add features where the costs to implement are a very small percentages of an immediate return. Chrysler found such a way to repair a transmission problem by investing trivial NRE dollars into computer firmware to fix a mechanical problem to save some tens of millions of dollars in mechanical repairs to transmissions in the field.

NRE-concepts-as-financial-investments are loss control tools considered part of manufacturing profit enhancement.
