= ARM Accredited Engineer =

Logo for the ARM Accredited Engineer program

ARM Accredited Engineer (AAE) was a program of professional accreditations awarded by ARM Holdings. The AAE program was designed for computer software and hardware engineers wishing to validate their knowledge of ARM technology. The program was launched in 2012 at a series of events including ARM TechCon 2012.

The AAE program consisted of a number of certifications, each with its own syllabus, and each assessed by means of a separate one-hour multiple-choice exam.

The AAE program was ended in 2016.

== Certifications ==
=== ARM Accredited Engineer (AAE) ===
AAE, an entry-level accreditation, was the first to be launched. The AAE syllabus covered software-related aspects of the ARMv7 Architecture, with a specific focus on Cortex-A and Cortex-R profiles, including applications processors and real-time processors. It did not cover Cortex-M systems. The AAE certification was aimed at general embedded software and systems developers who have a broad knowledge of ARM technology.

The syllabus covered the following subject areas:

- ARM architecture (30%)
- Software development (30%)
- Software optimization (15%)
- System (10%)
- Software debug (8%)
- Implementation (7%)

=== ARM Accredited MCU Engineer (AAME) ===
The AAME accreditation was launched on 16 September 2013. It was an entry-level accreditation, similar to the basic AAE accreditation, but focused on the ARMv7 Cortex-M profile. This accreditation was aimed at general embedded software engineers with a broad knowledge of ARM technology, with a bias toward microcontrollers.

The syllabus covered the following subject areas:

- ARM architecture (35%)
- Software development (30%)
- Debug (13%)
- Software optimization (10%)
- Implementation (7%)
- System Startup (5%)

=== Other accreditations ===
The following accreditations were being considered for launch between 2013 and 2016:

- ARM Accredited Cortex-A Engineer (AACAE)
- ARM Accredited Cortex-R Engineer (AACRE)
- AA Windows on ARM Developer (AAWoAD)
- AA Linux on ARM Developer (AALoAD)
- AA Android on ARM Developer (AAAoAD)
- AA Graphics Specialist (AAGS)
- AA Security Specialist (AASS)
- ARM Accredited Cortex-M Engineer (AACME)
- ARM Accredited SoC Developer (AASoCD)
- ARM Accredited SoC Specialist (AASoCS)

== Exams ==
All AAE Program exams were delivered by Prometric Inc. as supervised computer-based tests on dedicated test platforms throughout their network of 10,000 Authorized Prometric Test Centers (APTCs) around the world. There were 70 multiple choice questions. Candidates were given one hour to complete the test. Results were issued instantly on-screen. Grades are either pass or fail - no letter or percentage grades are issued. On passing the exam, candidates were able to request a paper certificate to be mailed to them.
