= Acorn A7000 =

British personal computer, released 1995

- Developer: Acorn Computers
- Manufacturer: Acorn Computers
- Released: 1995
- Operating system: RISC OS 3.60
- CPU: 32 MHz ARM7500
- Memory: 4–132 MB RAM
- Graphics: similar to VIDC20
- Sound: similar to VIDC20
- Dimensions: 102 mm (4.0 in) (h); 357 mm (14.1 in) (w); 283 mm (11.1 in) (d)
- Successor: A7000+
- Related: Risc PC

Acorn A7000+
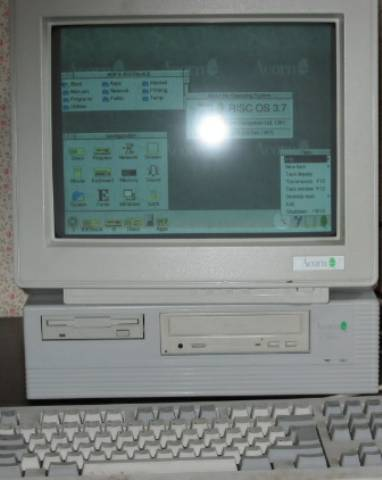
- Developer: Acorn Computers
- Manufacturer: Acorn Computers, Castle Technology
- Released: 1995
- Operating system: RISC OS 3.71.
- CPU: 48–56 MHz ARM7500FE
- Memory: 8–136 MB RAM
- Graphics: similar to VIDC20
- Sound: similar to VIDC20
- Dimensions: 102 mm (4.0 in) (h); 357 mm (14.1 in) (w); 283 mm (11.1 in) (d)
- Successor: Phoebe, Iyonix PC, A9home
- Related: Risc PC

The A7000 and A7000+ were entry-level computers produced by Acorn Computers, based in part on the Risc PC architecture.

Launched in 1995, the A7000 was considered a successor to the A5000, fitting into Acorn's range between the A4000 and Risc PC600, featuring a 32 MHz ARM7500 system-on-a-chip (SoC) and either 2 MB, 4 MB or 8 MB of RAM soldered to the motherboard, with a single memory slot permitting up to 128 MB of additional RAM. In performance terms, the A7000 was described as being three to four times faster than the A4000 and slightly faster than a Risc PC 600 model without video RAM fitted, also having comparable MIPS and Dhrystone performance ratings to 66 MHz Intel 486DX2 systems.

Unlike the Risc PC, the A7000 had been "designed with the rigours of school life in mind", aiming for "a 7-year classroom lifespan". The machine's case was similar to the Acorn Online Media set-top box design incorporating the same SoC, and the product was considered to have been "created specifically to satisfy the education market".

The A7000+ was launched in 1997 and featured a 48 MHz ARM7500FE SoC, thus being "the first time an ARM-based Acorn has shipped with hardware floating point as standard". On-board RAM was upgraded to a standard 8 MB, with the same single memory slot capable of holding 128 MB of RAM, but with the memory speed doubled to 32 MHz from the 16 MHz of the A7000. This apparently brought the machine's general performance into line with a 40 MHz Risc PC700 with 1 MB of video RAM, permitting various display resolutions and colour depths that were not possible on the earlier model. Despite using a related SoC to the earlier model, the A7000+ was upgraded to the extent that it was apparently almost sold as the A8000.

After the discontinuation of Acorn's computer business in 1998, Castle Technology bought the rights to continue production of the A7000+.

== Specifications and technical details ==
The ARM7500 system-on-a-chip combined into a single chip an ARM704 CPU, memory management unit, a video controller "similar but not identical to the VIDC20", much of the functionality of the Risc PC's I/O controller, plus support for PS/2 keyboards and joysticks.

	Acorn A7000	Acorn A7000+	Castle A7000+	Notes
CPU	ARM7500 @ 32 MHz	ARM7500FE @ 48 MHz	ARM7500FE @ 56 MHz	The FE in the ARM7500FE identifier indicates integrated floating point hardware.
Memory type	4 MB FPM	8 MB EDO		RAM mounted on motherboard. Additionally 1 SIMM slot, supporting an additional 128 MB.
Video subsystem	VIDC20-like video controller			Video controller integrated into ARM7500 core, display memory is shared with main memory.
Expansion	One Eurocard-sized podule support in common with Archimedes-series machines.			One internal network card socket.
Case	One 3.5 inch bay, with floppy drive, one 5.25 inch bay for a CD-ROM drive.			Only one of a CD-ROM/DVD-ROM drive or a Eurocard Podule could be fitted.
Ports	RS-232 Serial, DB25 Parallel, PS/2 keyboard, PS/2 mouse, 3.5mm headphone audio out, DE15 VGA			8P8C 10BASE-T network (optional).
Dimensions	H × W × D: 102 × 357 × 283 mm			
Operating system	RISC OS 3.60	RISC OS 3.71.		RISC OS 4 is available as a replacement. Alternatively NetBSD or ARM Linux (historically).

=== Modifications and variants ===
In 1998, MicroDigital announced a variant of the A7000+ called the Medi, repackaging the Acorn system in a new case and providing a CD-ROM drive and two free expansion slots as standard, as opposed to offering the choice of a CD-ROM drive or an expansion slot, along with a built-in sound digitiser. Acorn had reportedly given its "grudging" permission to MicroDigital to incorporate A7000-based hardware into the Medi product, but restrictions imposed on developments of this hardware and Acorn's subsequent demise led to the product's cancellation. Consequently, MicroDigital pursued the development of another ARM7500FE-based computer, the Mico, running RISC OS 4 and adopting the ISA and USB standards, relatively novel for RISC OS machines at the time of the machine's introduction.

==== Portables ====
In 1996, Acorn Risc Technologies (ART), a division of Acorn focusing on the development of products for Acorn and other companies, demonstrated a prototype laptop known as the Stork based on the ARM7500 processor, employing the casing of an Olivetti Echos subnotebook and reportedly featuring a colour LCD screen, this having been intended as a replacement for Acorn's earlier A4 laptop. However, Acorn declined to pursue production and instead awaited a "suitable commercial opportunity". A subsequent demonstration of the Stork prototype featured the use of a 9.5-inch greyscale screen with 16 grey levels, with the demonstrated hardware featuring 16 MB of RAM, potentially expandable to 256 MB using two SODIMM slots, a 425 MB 2.5-inch hard drive, PCMCIA, serial and parallel ports. Control of the mouse pointer was exercised using a tracker ball arrangement that managed to support the three-button mouse arrangement using buttons on the left and right sides of the case. A nickel-cadmium battery permitted two hours of use on a single charge, depending on hard drive usage, but the machine also supported "the ability to freeze the machine" and to restart it up to a week later. Already, by early 1997, the Stork model had been superseded by another in development at ART known as Artisan.

Development of a portable machine based on the ARM7500FE was pursued by Innovative Media Solutions in collaboration with Interconnex UK Limited and Acorn Computers, with a model demonstrated in 1998 at the Wakefield Spring Show (a regular commercial event for the Acorn market). Employing an existing Twinhead PC laptop design with a "standard Windows 95" keyboard and "two button glidepoint" touchpad, the machine's footprint was stated as 297mm x 236mm, being slightly larger but thinner (at 47mm) than Acorn's A4 laptop, offering a 12.1-inch colour TFT screen with a 800 x 600 resolution displaying up to 256 colours. Alongside the 48 MHz ARM7500FE processor, the machine had 16 MB of RAM fitted, expandable to 32 MB, and the demonstrated model provided a 2 GB hard disk, high-density floppy drive, and "20-speed CD-ROM" drive. Ports were provided for an external monitor, keyboard and mouse, together with serial and parallel connectors. RISC OS 3.71 was demonstrated running on the machine, but despite operating system support for PCMCIA devices being present, the PCMCIA slots were disabled for apparent reliability reasons. With a nickel metal hydride (NiMH) battery, four hours of use was estimated on a single charge. The projected price of the machine was £1,500 plus VAT. Later developments enabled PCMCIA support for the machine, and a "generic Hayes modem driver" for modem cards was promised. Despite apparent demand for the product, changes in Acorn's strategy led to difficulties in component procurement and the eventual demise of the endeavour.

A subsequent laptop or portable initiative involved a product design from RiscStation, a producer of ARM7500FE-based RISC OS machines, based on hardware by Simtec Electronics. In 2002, this hardware was demonstrated publicly alongside a Windows-based laptop whose casing was meant to illustrate the physical characteristics of the eventual laptop product. The use of a Windows laptop running the Virtual Acorn emulation software had caused confusion and doubt as to the authenticity of the demonstrated hardware. Despite signs of progress, in 2003, RiscStation abandoned its plans to deliver this product, instead choosing to sell "off the shelf" Windows laptops running Virtual Acorn.

A user modification (dubbed the A7KP) to rehouse an A7000+ as a portable weighing 5 lb (2.3 kg) was seen in 2011.
