= Phoebe (computer) =

Proposed computer by Acorn, cancelled 1998

Phoebe 2100

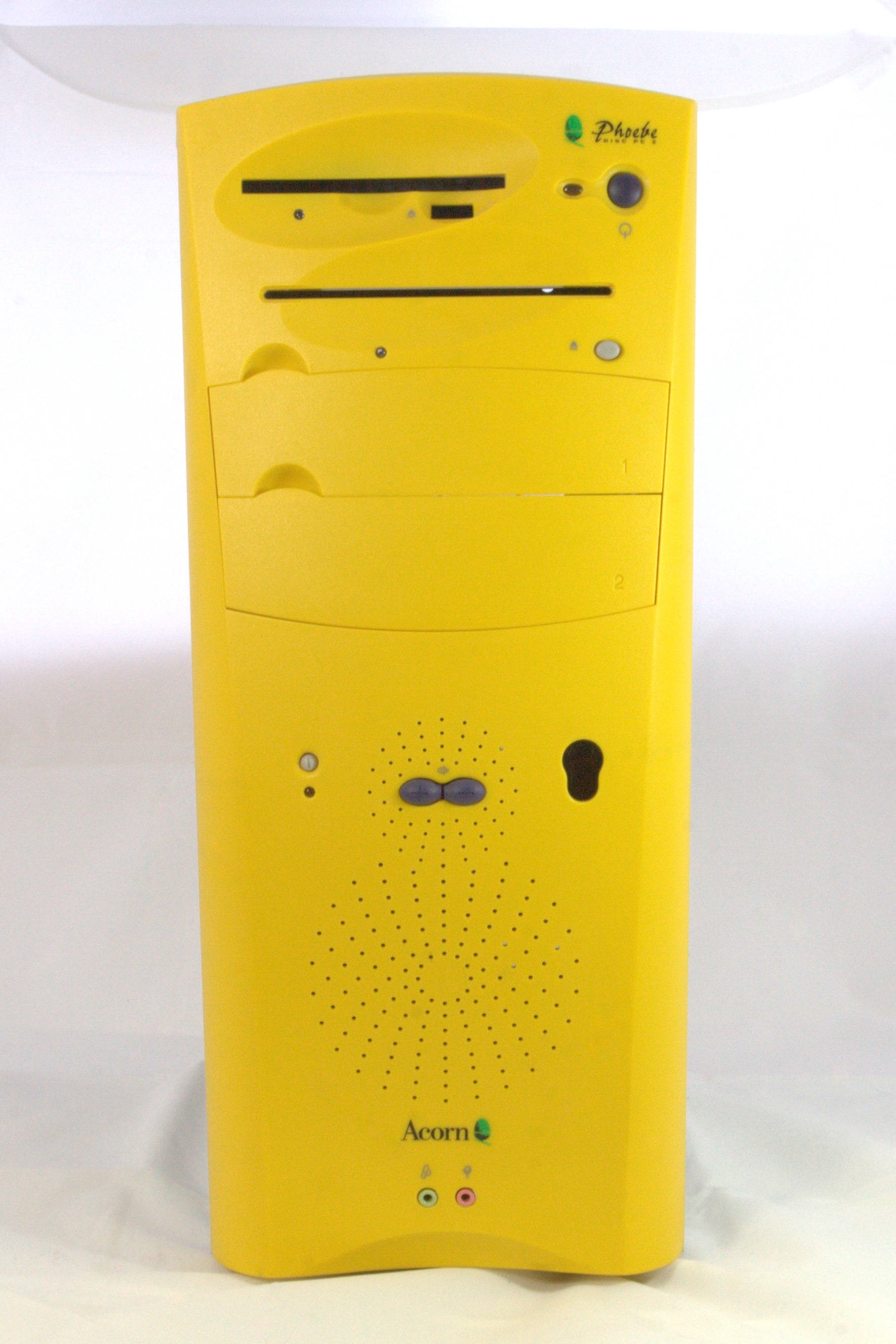
- The case of the Acorn Phoebe 2100
- Developer: Acorn Computers
- Type: 32-bit microcomputer
- Released: Cancelled before launch in late 1998
- Introductory price: £1499 (exc VAT) in 1998
- Media: floppy disk, hard disk, CD-ROM
- Operating system: RISC OS 4
- CPU: 233 MHz Intel StrongARM SA110
- Memory: up to 512 MiB of SDRAM
- Display: VGA
- Graphics: VIDC20 R
- Sound: VIDC20 R
- Input: Keyboard, Mouse, Joystick
- Connectivity: 2 x RS-232 serial, printer parallel

The Phoebe 2100 (or RiscPC 2) was to be Acorn Computers' successor to the RiscPC, slated for release in late 1998. However, in September 1998, Acorn cancelled the project as part of a restructuring of the company.

== Specification ==
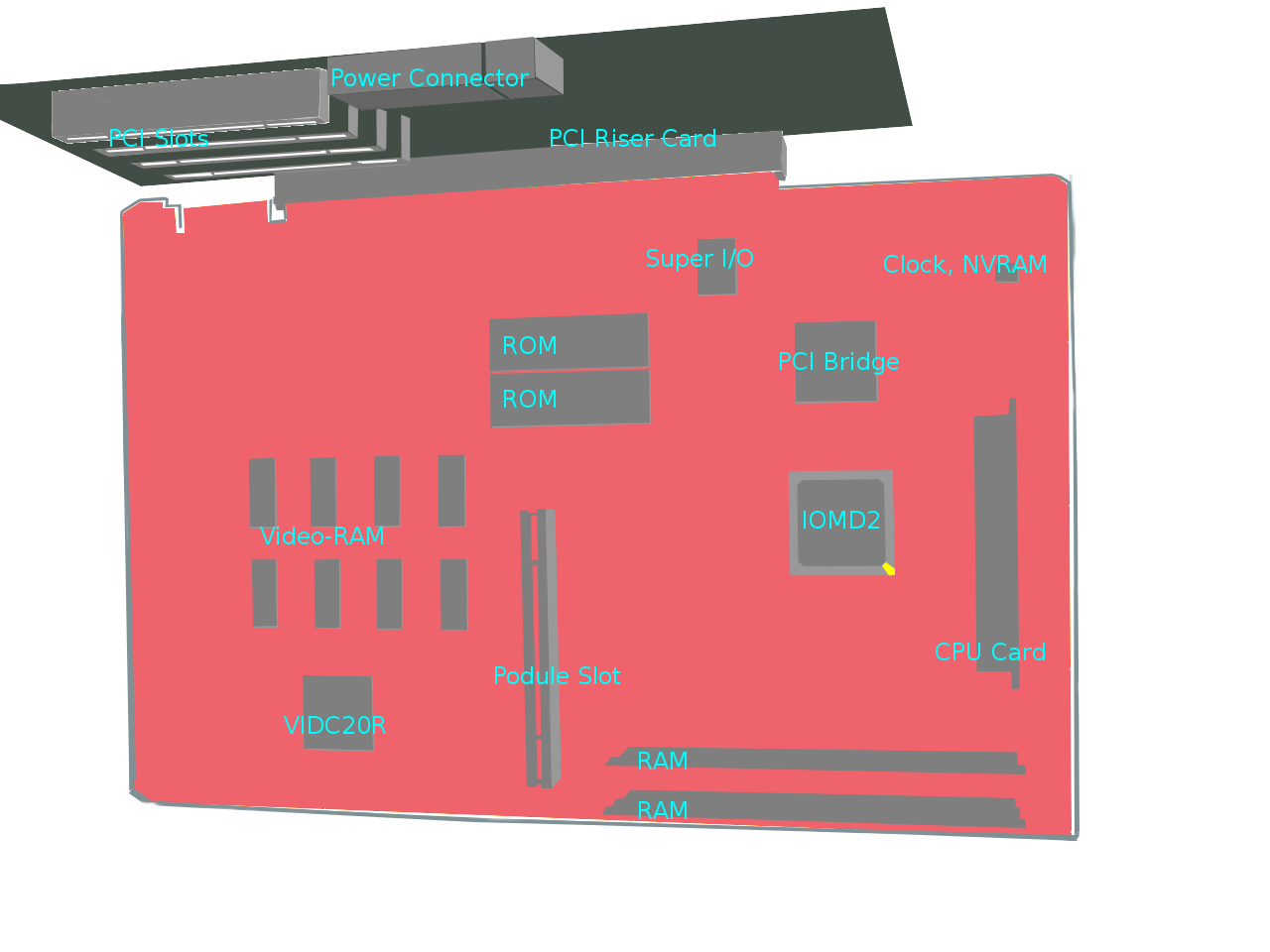
Phoebe mainboard overview

- 233 MHz Intel StrongARM SA110 Revision S CPU.
  - Support for multiple CPUs on daughter cards is possible; however, multiple CPU support was not available in RISC OS.
- 64 MHz front-side bus
- Up to 512 MiB of SDRAM
- IOMD2 I/O Controller
  - PLX Technology PCI bridge PCI9080
    - Four PCI slots (33 MHz)
  - PC Style Joystick/Game Port
  - Three Acorn Podule expansion sockets
  - SMC37672 SuperIO chip supporting:
    - PS/2 Keyboard and Mouse
    - Two EIDE channels supporting up to four devices (6.4 GB unit supplied)
    - Two serial ports
    - Parallel port
    - Single Floppy drive
- VIDC20 Revision R video controller supporting
- 4 MiB of EDO VRAM running at 200 MHz
- NLX form factor Tower case with a custom yellow front panel (by the designers of Iomega's zip drive)
- Slot-loading CD-ROM drive
- 5.25" drive bays
- 230 W PSU unit.

Processors running at 300 MHz were being sampled by Acorn in September 1998, with 360 MHz versions also expected.

== Development ==
In November 1996, the design of what was to become Phoebe 2100 was started. The design took into account a number of perceived weaknesses of the RiscPC design, a slow memory architecture, limited I/O capability, limited expansion, and not adhering to industry standards. To overcome these weakness a number of design objectives were created: harness the full potential of the StrongARM CPU, support multiple processors, add support for PCI expansion, offer the best possible graphics, run existing RISC OS applications, and provide enhanced RISC OS functionality. An additional design objective of reusing the same case as the RiscPC was dropped due to power supply requirements and electrical interference problems.

To provide for these new capabilities Acorn had to design two new support chips for the system:

- VIDC20R, a new revision of the VIDC20 video chip used in the RiscPC. Using a shrink of the process to 0.6 μm, a 100% performance increase was gained. Due to this being logically the same chip as the previous generation there would be no issues with software compatibility.
- IOMD2, the new IO chip had to support multiple processors, included message passing and multiple bus mastering, and was manufactured using a 0.35 μm process. Throughout development and prototyping the IOMD2 were developed on a large FPGA.

During 1997 and 1998, Acorn regularly took prototype and mock-up hardware to various Acorn computer shows, including Acorn World October 1997, Wakefield Acorn Spring Show May 1998 and the Acorn Southeast Show June 1998.

By May 1998, Acorn started to offer their 'Registered Developer' scheme members the chance to pre-order a pre-launch prototype for testing and development, these were offered at a £950 (excl. VAT) a significant discount on the public price of £1500 (ex VAT) revealed in June.

On 15 September 1998, the first Phoebe 2100 motherboards with silicon (rather than FPGA) based IOMD2 chips were powered up. They successfully ran at the full front-side bus speed of 64 MHz, and the improved performance of the video chip was also seen; however, various bugs in the sound DMA were reported and general system instability was noted. As such, no shippable prototypes were yet available to send to the 'Registered Developers'.

Two days later, on 17 September 1998, the development of Phoebe 2100 was cancelled.

Development was expected to cost £2.1 million.

== Operating system ==
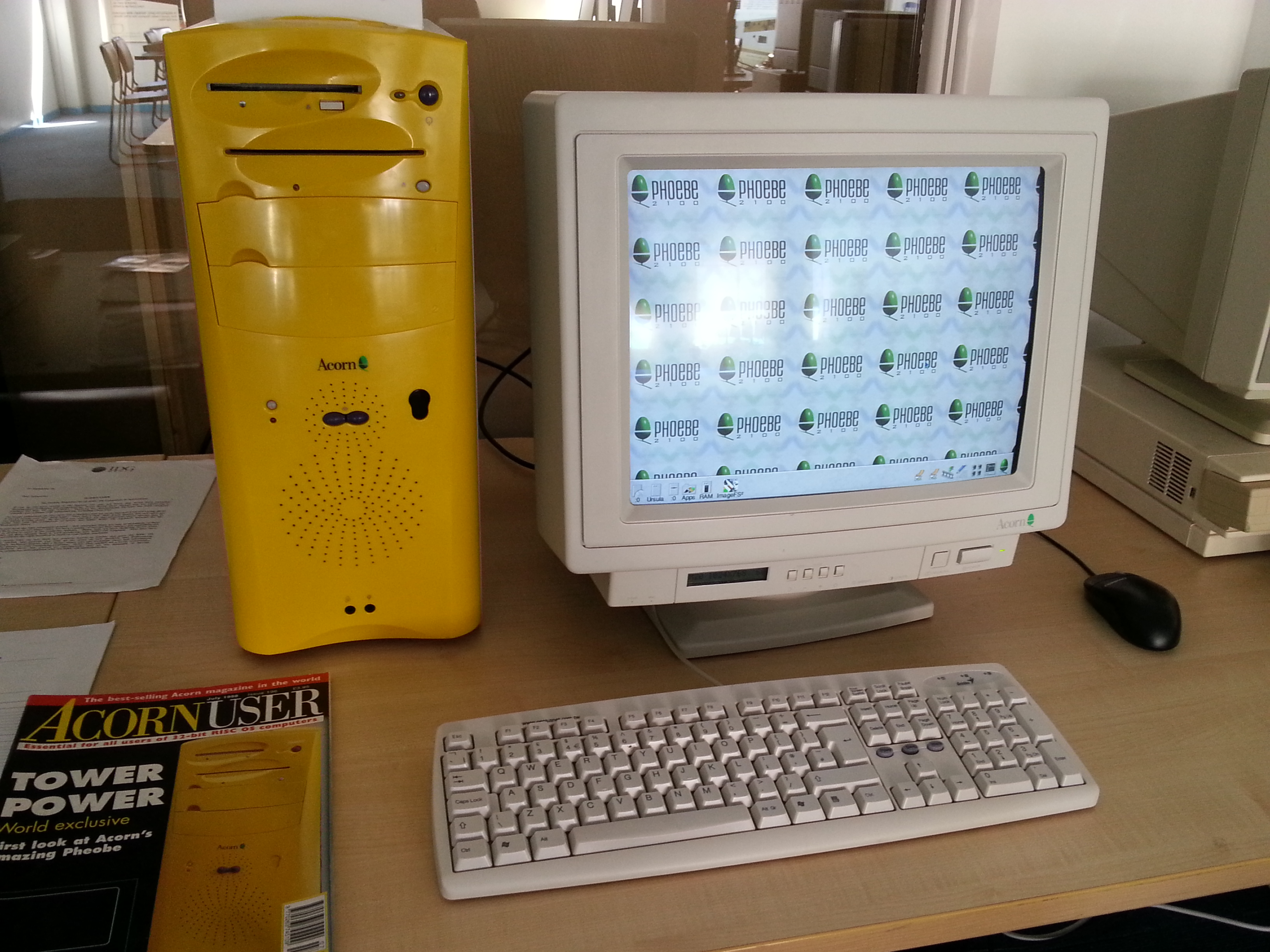
Phoebe running

During the years following the release of the RiscPC, Acorn had discussed using an alternative to RISC OS as their next operating system, using TAOS or writing their own microkernel-based operating system Galileo. However, for the launch of Phoebe 2100 an enhanced version of RISC OS would be developed, called RISC OS 4 (codenamed 'Ursula'). RISC OS wouldn't support the multiple processor daughter cards that had been included in the Phoebe 2100 hardware specification.

RISC OS 4 had to support the new hardware of Phoebe 2100 which wasn't present in Acorn's earlier machines:

- PCI expansion slots
- Support for multiple serial ports
- The PC style game port, supporting joystick and MIDI

In addition several new features were to be added to the core of RISC OS:

- A better file system, increasing the number of items in directory from 77 to approx 88,000 and increasing the max length of a filename from 10 characters to 255
- A plugin-based system configuration utility
- A new screensaver API
- An enhanced window manager
- An updated interactive help application
- A redesigned set of icons

To prepare developers for the changes to the OS, Acorn released to its 'Registered Developer' program RISC OS 3.80, designed to load on Acorn's previous generation RiscPC and A7000 computers. This would enable developers to test that their software would be compatible with Phoebe 2100, provided it didn't require any of the new hardware features. RISC OS 3.80 was limited; it only ran on ARM6 and ARM7 RiscPCs and not StrongARM (ARMv4) based ones. Testing of hardware compatibility would have to wait until an initial run of 100 or so pre-production machines was made available to Registered Developers.

== Code names ==
The Phoebe 2100 project used a series of names inspired by characters from the TV series Friends as code names for the components.

- Phoebe – the machine itself, name carried over to launch title Phoebe 2100
- Ursula – the operating system, RISC OS 4, that it was to run
- Chandler – the IOMD2 chip
- Rachel – processor card
- Monica – PCI bridge

== Cancellation ==
On 17 September 1998, Acorn finished a review of its business and decided to close the 'Workstation Division', the department developing Phoebe 2100, and all work stopped.

Acorn Computers' CEO Stan Boland said, "There is not a big enough market for the PC (Risc PC 2), which is largely for home use and games. It's an enthusiast's product. We are going to resize the rest of the company and concentrate on becoming a digital TV and thin client company". Computerworld Online News reported an Acorn spokesman saying "The problem was that it would have had a retail cost about twice as high as for a comparable PC".

After cancellation it came to light that as few as 150 to 300 pre-orders had been placed.

== Aftermath ==
In the aftermath of the cancellation of Phoebe 2100 and Acorn Computers' change in direction from general computing to set-top box development and DSP silicon design there were several attempts to resurrect some or all of the Phoebe 2100 hardware or RISC OS 4 development.

Of these, the only successful group was the Steering Group who, after initially being interested in releasing the Phoebe 2100, realised it would be financially prohibitive and set about creating a new company RISCOS Ltd. In March 1999, RISCOS Ltd negotiated a licence with Element 14, the recently renamed Acorn Computers, and set about finishing the development of RISC OS 4. In July 1999 RISCOS Ltd launched RISC OS 4 to the public. It supported Acorn's RiscPC and A7000/+ machines.

In addition, after the cancellation, excess stock of the Phoebe 2100 yellow NLX case was sold by CTA Direct, sometimes including an NLX-compatible PC.

The only known working Phoebe 2100 is held in the collection of The Centre for Computing History in Cambridge, England.
