= VIDC1 =

Video display controller for Acorn computers

The VIDC1 was a Video Display Controller chip created as an accompanying chip to the ARM CPU used in Acorn Archimedes computer systems. Its successor, the VIDC20, was later used in RiscPCs.

== Video ==
The VIDC1 offers colour depths of 1, 2, 4 or 8 bits per colour, allowing for 2, 4, 16 and 256 colour displays (the VIDC20 can offer up to approximately 16 million colours). A colour lookup table or palette register set of 16 12-bit words was provided, offering a range of 4096 colours for each of the colours in those displays or modes employing up to 16 colours. The 12 bits were split in three 4-bit RGB values, with a 4-bit high speed D/A converter for each of the three primary colours. However, in 256 colour modes, 4 bits of the colour data were hardware derived and could not be adjusted. The net result was 256 colours, covering a range of the 4096 available colours.

Since the device had no horizontal sync interrupt, it was difficult to display additional colours by changing the palette for each scan line, but not impossible, thanks to the 2 MHz IOC timer 1. Many demos managed to display 4096 colours on screen, or in a sense more through dithering.

The timing generator was fully programmable, and could be clocked with an 8 to 24 MHz clock. Resolutions that could be supported were 1024×1024 in monochrome, 640×512 in 16 colours, or 640×256 in 256 colours. The high-resolution monochrome output was achieved by exposing pixel data in parallel via the four red channel output signals. Each group of four pixels would be presented at a rate of 24 MHz, and this data would then be serialised at a rate of 96 MHz, taking each pixel in turn from the exposed pixel values to generate the output signal.

It had also one hardware 32-pixel wide sprite with unlimited height (by default used for the mouse pointer), where each pixel is coded in two bits: value 0 is for transparency, and the three others are freely chosen from the 4096 colour palette.

Acorn also used the VIDC chip in its laser printer interface module, which featured in its Technical Publishing System solution. The VIDC was used to generate a high-resolution monochrome signal driven by "a gated form of the synchronised laser dot clock", assisted by a proprietary video laser interface chip, VLASER6. In the Technical Publishing System, the module was "configured specifically to drive a 300 dpi Canon CX/SX print engine directly". Unlike conventional video, each raster line produced by the print engine effectively corresponded to a single video frame having only a single scanline, with vertical synchronisation occurring repeatedly over the course of generating a single page. An A4 page could have a resolution of 2432 dots horizontally, reproduced in 3440 lines vertically, requiring a total of over 8 million pixels.

== Sound ==
The VIDC also supported eight-channel stereo logarithmic 8-bit PWM sound.
