= Galileo (operating system) =

- Developer: Acorn Computers
- Working state: Unreleased
- Available in: English
- Supported platforms: ARM
- License: Proprietary
- Preceded by: RISC OS

Galileo was an unreleased 32-bit operating system that was under development by Acorn Computers as a long-term project to produce "an ultra-modern scalable, portable, multi-tasking, multi-threading, object-oriented, microkernel operating system", reportedly significant enough to Acorn's strategy to warrant a statement to the financial markets.

Announced in early 1997 as targeting "the next generation of smart appliances", running initially on ARM architecture devices but intended to be easily portable to "other RISC processors" (or even "a range of RISC and CISC processors"), emphasis was made on its quality of service features that would guarantee system resources to critical tasks, as well as its reliability, its sophistication relative to RISC OS (which was described as "too primitive to succeed as a 21st century operating system"), and its small footprint that would "enable Acorn to compete in the semi-embedded systems market". However, the system's "modular object-oriented" architecture gave it the scalability to potentially be deployed in devices ranging from "multimedia cellular phones" and network computers to desktop workstations and server platforms.

== Features ==
The operating system was to offer an "innovative modular real time kernel", also described as a microkernel, with a hardware abstraction layer, having a footprint of only 15 KB. The kernel itself supported preemptive multitasking, being "multi-threaded and fully pre-emptive", and was portable through extensive high-level language use (an estimated 95% of the code) in conjunction with the hardware abstraction layer. Kernel responsibilities included memory allocation, interrupt handling, direct memory access services, scheduling, and the resource allocation required by the quality of service functionality.

Systems using Galileo were to be able to leverage the modularity of the software architecture to deliver a "complete customisable software stack" that could be deployed in ROM, with system modules and applications being executed in-place to reduce RAM requirements. The architecture was also meant to allow additional components, such as multimedia codecs or network stacks, to be downloaded and deployed without the need to restart the system. It was noted that "virtually all Galileo tasks run in user mode", with "complete memory and CPU usage protection" enforced to uphold the quality of service regime.

The inclusion of quality of service features was intended to "eliminate the need for dedicated multimedia chips" in consumer-level Internet appliances, particularly those chips concerned with video compression and decompression that might instead be implemented in software, thus helping manufacturers to reduce system costs below an anticipated target given of $100 by 1998. Such objectives were to be achieved through collaboration with system-on-chip manufacturers, with a specific collaboration in progress mentioned in early 1997, and with "companies such as Hitachi" expected to release suitable hardware in 1998.

The principal engineer working on Galileo within Acorn was Sunil Kittur, affiliated with Acorn's Online Media division and previously involved with ICL's GOLDRUSH MegaSERVER product, a multiprocessing SPARC-based parallel database server system running the Chorus/MiX microkernel-based operating system.

== Fate ==
The operating system was scheduled to be the successor of RISC OS, although Acorn envisaged RISC OS remaining relevant for "high functionality ARM based devices" in the short to medium term, with Galileo being aimed at "portable and networked interactive media devices". Early versions for existing Acorn customers were anticipated by the second half of 1997, and the Galileo kernel was stated as having been "up and running" as a prototype, but the project was cancelled when the workstation division closed as part of Acorn's restructuring in 1998.

The commercial potential of Galileo had been put into some doubt by the announcement of the Symbian alliance which established Psion's EPOC operating system as the basis of a mobile communications platform to be adopted by Nokia and Ericsson, with Motorola having also announced a commitment to the initiative. Despite Galileo promising to be "technically better" than EPOC, the comparative readiness of the two offerings was summarised in one publication's remark that "EPOC has started the race while Galileo is still in the pits with its engine in bits". Nevertheless, at that time, hopes were expressed for opportunities for the product in set-top boxes and network computers.
