= Castle Technology =

Computer company based in Cambridge, England

Castle Technology Limited
- Company type: Private
- Industry: Computer hardware Computer software
- Founded: 4 June 1993; 32 years ago, in Colchester, England
- Founder: John Ballance; Jack Lillingston; Peter Wild
- Defunct: 2018
- Successor: RISC OS Developments Ltd.
- Headquarters: Cambridge, England
- Area served: Worldwide
- Key people: Jack Lillingston (CEO); Peter Wild (COO); John Ballance (CTO)
- Products: Iyonix PC; RISC OS; RISC PC
- Divisions: Tematic
- Website: castle-technology.co.uk at the Wayback Machine (archived 2006-02-15)

Castle Technology Limited, named after Framlingham Castle, was a British computer company based in Cambridge, England. It began as a producer of ARM computers and manufactured the Acorn-branded range of desktop computers that run RISC OS.

Following the break-up of Acorn in 1998, Castle Technology bought the rights to continue production of the RISC PC and A7000+ computers under the Acorn brand. Castle Technology later released the Iyonix PC in November 2002, the first desktop computer to use the Intel XScale microarchitecture and then bought the rights to the RISC OS Technology from Pace in July 2003.

== History ==
After Acorn withdrew from the desktop computer industry in 1998, Castle Technology acquired the rights to produce the A7000, A7000+ and RISC PC using the Acorn brand.

In 2001, development started on the Iyonix PC (codenamed Tungsten) as a set-top unit (STU) in secret by engineers at Pace's Shipley campus along with a 32-bit version of RISC OS 4 (known as RISC OS 5). When management discovered the project the campus was closed.

Castle Technology acquired the proposed designs and the original engineers from Pace to further develop the Tungsten into a desktop computer. Robert Sprowson, the original hardware designer, declined to join Castle Technology and so Peter Wild was recruited. The Iyonix PC was released six months later. Although it was well received, it was not designed for long-term production and therefore used some components that were near obsolete when it was released.

A problem for the Iyonix PC was that it used leaded components which were outlawed with the adoption of Directive 2002–95/EC in February 2003 by the European Union. However, by this time Castle Technology was financially troubled and could not afford to re-engineer the Iyonix PC without the leaded components. The remaining Iyonix stock were passed to Iyonix Limited which stopped distribution on 30 September 2008.

In 2004, Castle Technology acquired Tematic to further development of RISC OS in embedded systems. In December 2005, Castle Technology moved its main office to the former premises of its software development division, following the migration of Tematic to a neighbouring premises in Signet Court, Cambridge.

In 2018 RISC OS Developments acquired Castle Technology Ltd including the Intellectual Property.
