= Acorn Computers (2006) =

British company founded in 2006 unrelated to ARM

Acorn Computers Limited
- Type: Computer hardware
- Industry: Computer hardware
- Predecessor: Acorn Computers (via brand acquisition)
- Founded: April 2006 (second launch)
- Defunct: December 2009
- Fate: Dissolved
- Headquarters: Nottingham, England, UK
- Products: deskBOOK series; sohoNOTE series; dataPOD
- Website: Website at the Wayback Machine (archived 2008-07-13)

Acorn Computers Ltd was a British computer company based in Nottingham, England in the United Kingdom between 2006 and 2009. It licensed, in early 2006, the dormant Acorn Computers trademark from French company Aristide & Co Antiquaire De Marques. This company sold IBM PC compatible computers and had no connection to ARM, a spin-off from the original Acorn Computers.

== Launch ==
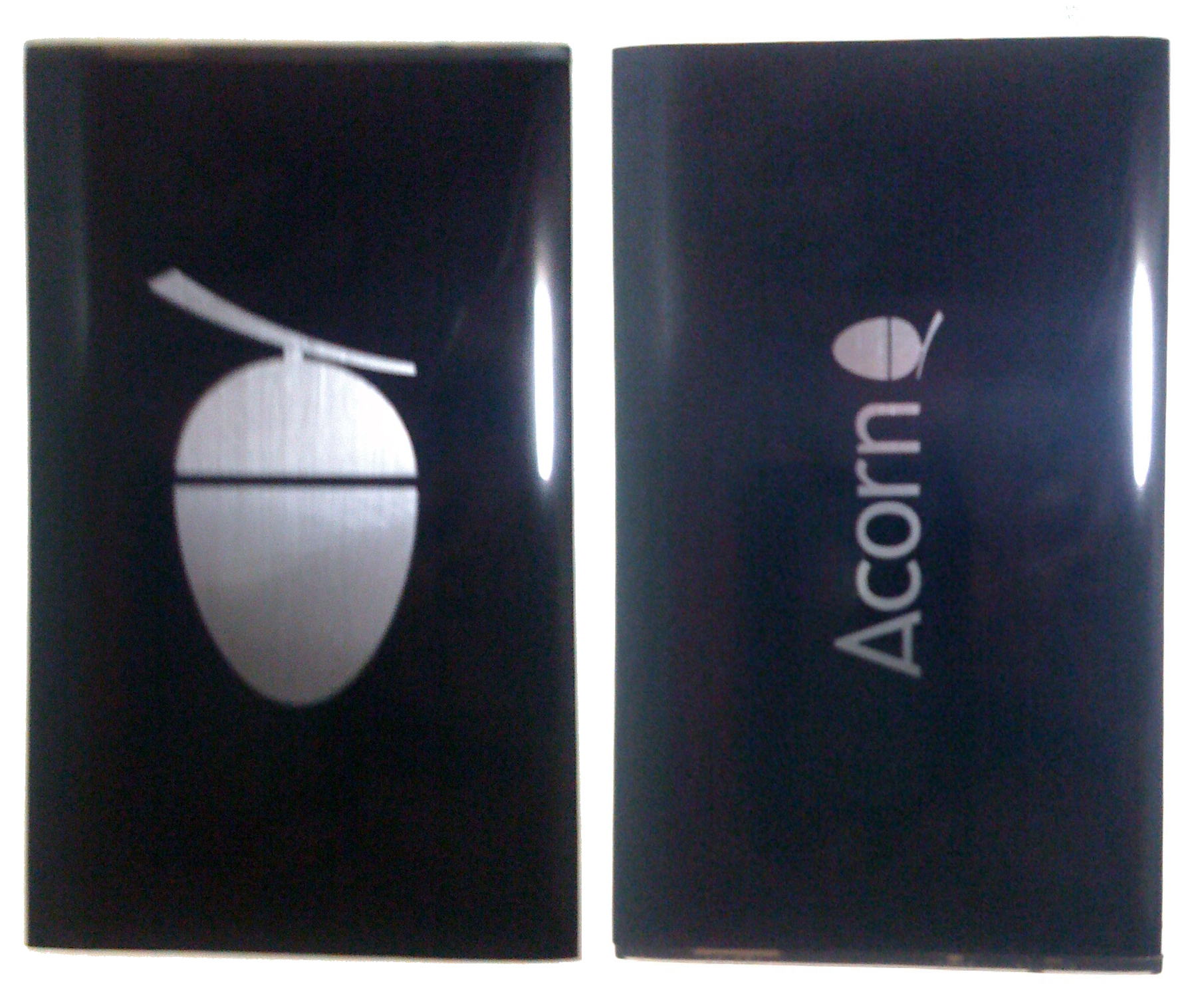
An Acorn dataPOD external harddrive

In April 2006, internet news portals claimed that the Acorn company was to relaunch. The new company announced its range before the 2006 Computer Trade Show, held at the NEC near Birmingham, UK. At the show, the company distributed leaflets inviting people to "be part of one of the most exciting brand re-launches in UK history" by joining its reseller program.

== Products ==
The company sold a range of laptop computers. The systems used Microsoft Windows rather than the RISC OS operating system developed by the original Acorn Computers and this incarnation of Acorn did not support or license any technologies or products of the original, apart from the name and trademark.

The reuse of the Acorn Computers Ltd name caused an amount of confusion and controversy, particularly amongst users of the original company's products.

== Domain dispute ==
On 24 July 2006, Nominet's Dispute Resolution Service ruled that the domain name acorncomputers.co.uk should be transferred to the new Acorn from computer enthusiast Roy Johnson. The company made a complaint to the service contending that the "use of Acorn Computers' company name is illegal and has caused much confusion and continues to do so which is detrimental to [Acorn] and extremely misleading". Despite the fact that Johnson appeared to have been operating the website since at least 2001, five years before the new Acorn was registered as a company, Nominet ruled in favour of Acorn, as Johnson had not maintained an accurate record of his postal address, and mail to Johnson's registered address was returned by Royal Mail marked 'addressee has gone away'.

== Demise ==
Acorn Computers Ltd failed to file any accounts at Companies House, and so was struck off the limited companies register and dissolved in December 2009.
