= Risc PC =

Family of personal computers

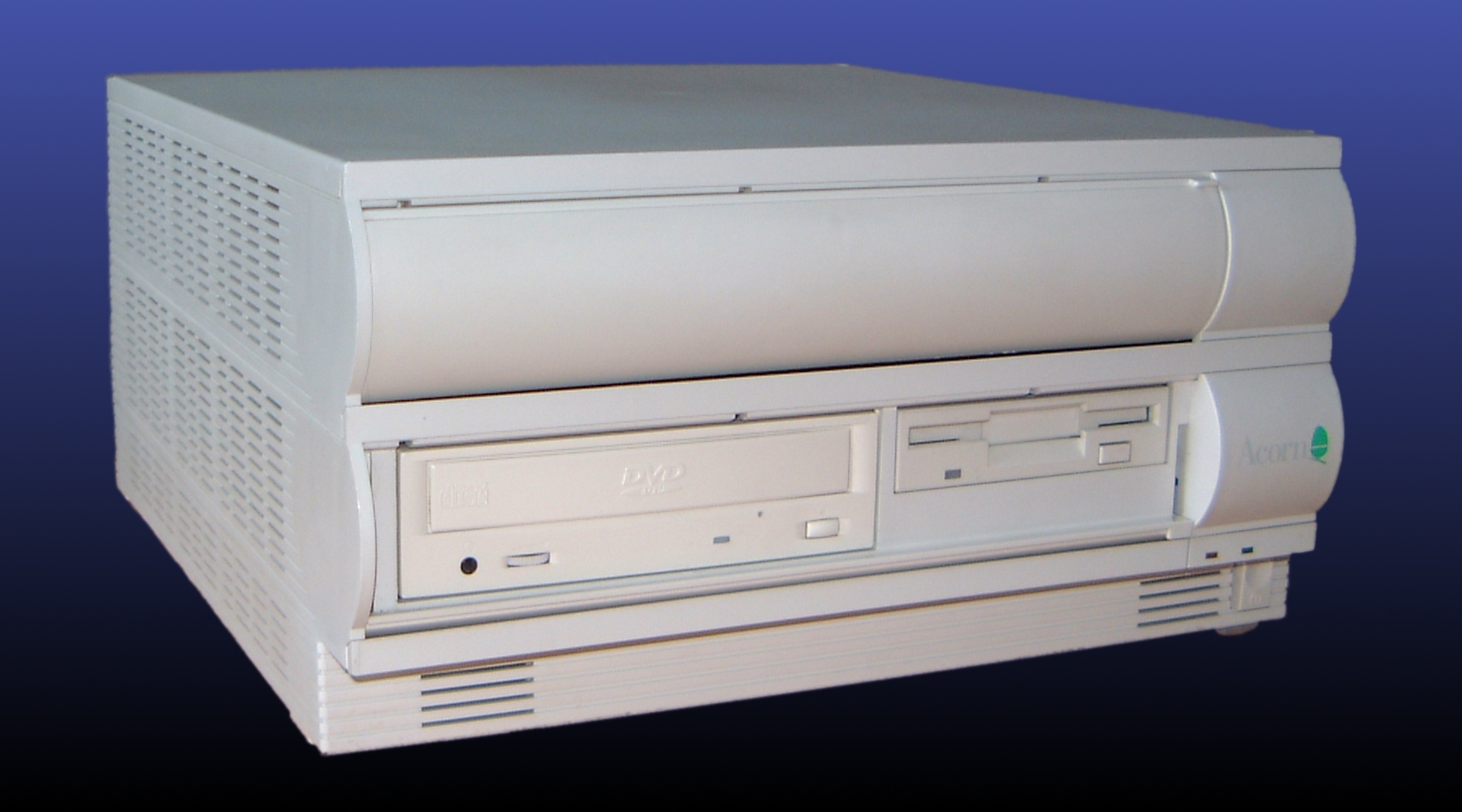
- Acorn Risc PC 600 with two case slices, 3.5-inch disk drive and DVD-ROM drive
- Developer: Acorn Computers
- Manufacturer: Acorn Computers, Castle Technology
- Released: 15 April 1994; 32 years ago
- Discontinued: 11 November 2003
- Operating system: RISC OS
- CPU: ARMv3/ARMv4
- Graphics: VIDC20
- Dimensions: 117 mm (4.6 in) (h); 355 mm (14.0 in) (w); 384 mm (15.1 in) (d)
- Predecessor: Archimedes series
- Successor: Phoebe (cancelled), Iyonix PC, A9home
- Related: A7000
- Website: acorn.com at the Wayback Machine (archived 1998-02-02)

Risc PC is a range of personal computers launched in 1994 by Acorn, replacing the Archimedes series. The machines use an ARM CPU, developed by Acorn spinoff company ARM, and were thereby not IBM PC-compatible.

At launch, the original Risc PC 600 model was fitted as standard with an ARM610, a 32-bit RISC CPU (with 26-bit address bus) with 4 KB of cache and clocked at 30 MHz. CPU technology advanced rapidly in this period though and within only two years a DEC StrongARM could be installed at 233 MHz which was around 8 times faster.

The machines were supplied with the RISC OS operating system which has a windowed cooperative multitasking design. Unusually for a PC of the period the O/S was stored in ROM, which enabled a relatively fast boot time. In addition Acorn sold a Virtual PC package that permitted x86 applications to be run in a virtual machine; they also supported the development of an ARM Linux distribution from 1996.

In contrast to most contemporary IBM clones, the machines supported multiple processors as a standard feature. Secondary (or "guest") CPUs did not need to be ARM-based and could be an entirely different architecture. It was possible to add an x86 CPU which enabled use of operating systems including DOS and Windows 95. Cards could often be added to other machines of the era to run DOS software but more usually these would implement the majority of an IBM PC clone on the card. The Risc PC required only the addition of the relevant CPU with some interface logic.

Alternative operating systems ran concurrently with RISC OS in a window. Applications from both operating systems could run at the same time in a similar fashion to a virtual machine with data shared between them. While now a ubiquitous technology, this was a less common feature in 1994 and more usually only one operating system would run at once on a single PC.

The Risc PC had a novel case design where additional chassis, known as "slices", could be stacked on top of each other, expanding the height of the machine. Up to six additional slices could be stacked, each containing additional drives or expansion cards (known as "podules"). At the time the IBM clone industry was standardised around the PCI bus, but Acorn used its own bus implementation that was not compatible and required its own unique expansion cards. The machines did use the then industry standard IDE or SCSI drives found in contemporary PCs.

Acorn discontinued production of the Risc PC in 1998 after a corporate reorganisation but Castle Technology continued manufacturing the machines until 2003 and subsequently then produced their own similar designs. RISC OS is still available after becoming an open source product.

== Technical specifications ==
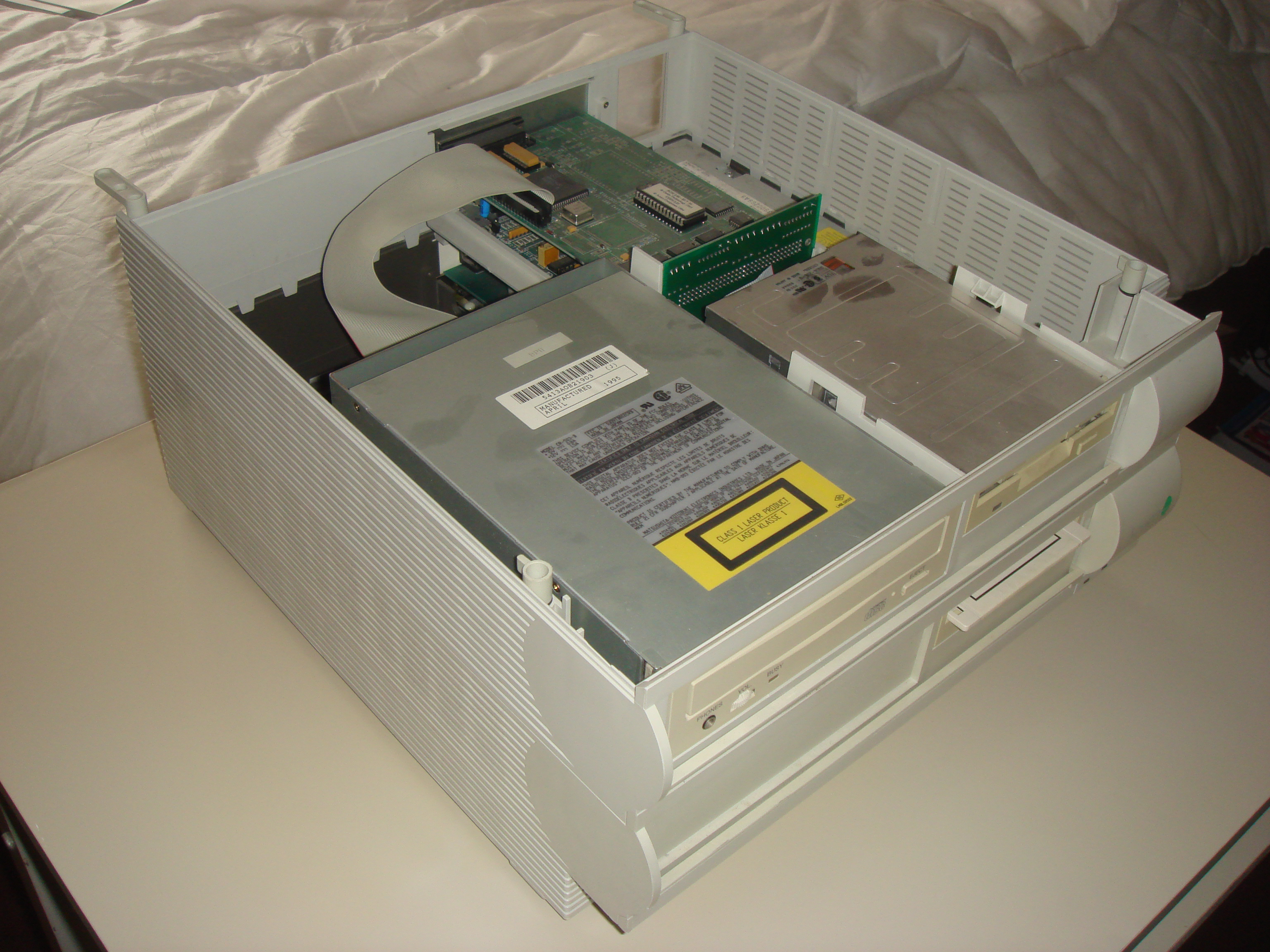
Risc PC with lid removed, showing fixing lugs. The top slice has not been internally sprayed for RF shielding.

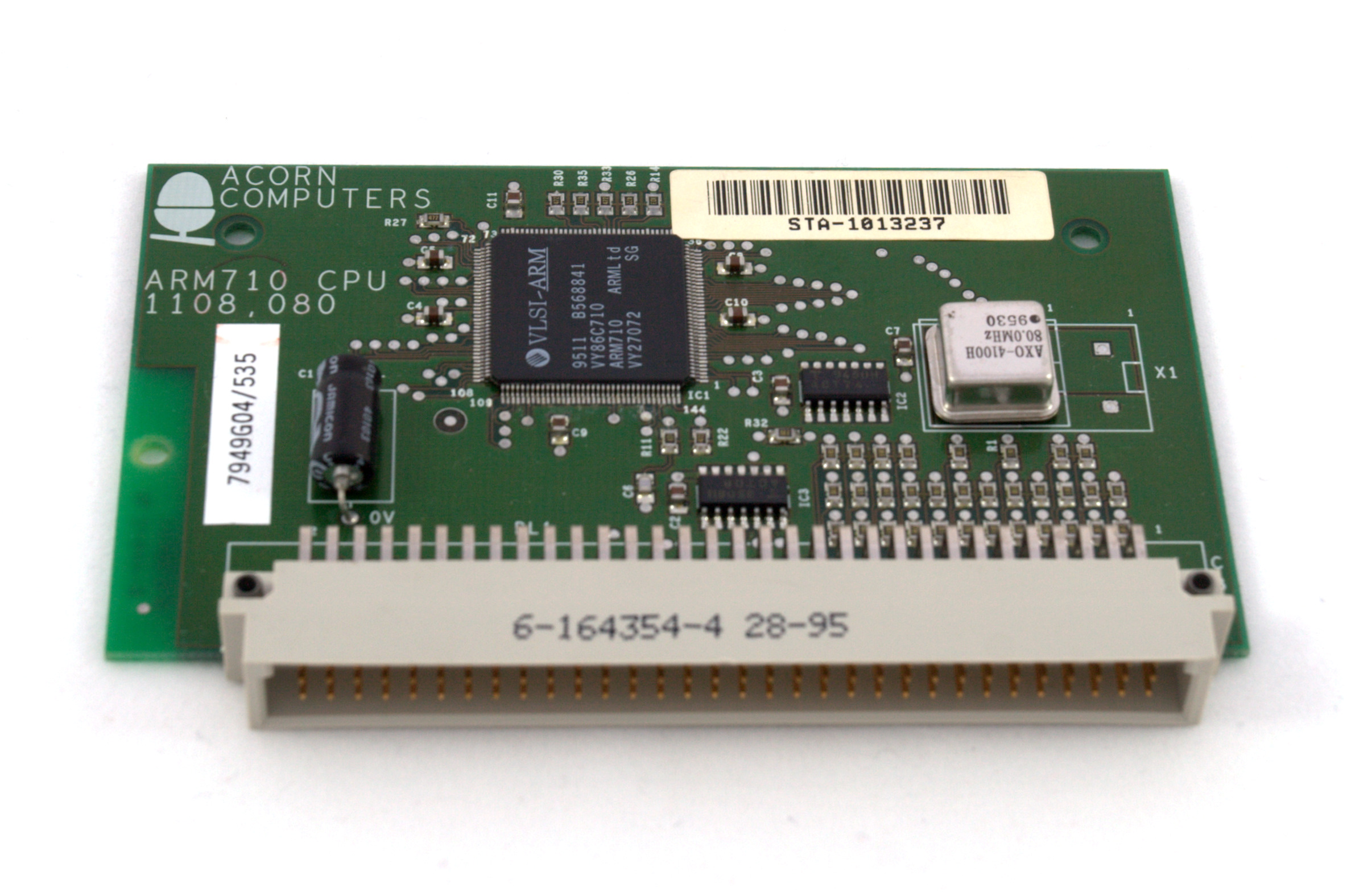
An ARM 710 CPU card for the Risc PC

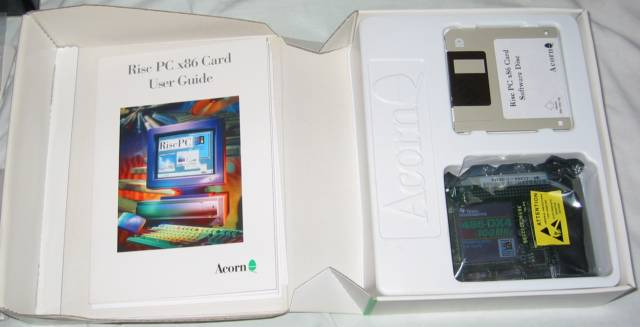
The Acorn ACA56 Acorn PC card upgrade, showing the user guide, software disc, and card itself

- CPU: Dual-processor slots, one host processor and one guest processor.
  - Host processors:
    - ARM610 at 30 MHz or 33 MHz
    - ARM710 at 40 MHz
    - StrongARM at 203 MHz, 236 MHz or 300 MHz.
    - Additionally prototypes of 33 MHz ARM700 and 55 MHz ARM810 processors were developed by Acorn, but not released.
  - Guest processors:
    - 486-class and at least IBM 5x86C co-processors at up to 133 MHz. These PC cards and software allow PC compatible software to be run.
    - DSP chips (third party) were also available.
- Memory type: Two 72-pin FPM SIMM slots, supporting a maximum memory size of 256 MiB.
- Video subsystem: VIDC20 controller, with optional dual-port VRAM up to 2 MiB.
- Expansion: Eurocard-sized Podule support in common with Archimedes-series machines. The Risc PC also offers DMA support in the first two podules on the bus. Third parties produced similar cards.
- Operating system: RISC OS, stored in 4 MiB ROM (RISC OS 3.50 shipped on 2 MiB ROMs) supplemented by disc-based components.
  - Fitted as standard:
    - RISC OS 3.50 (Risc PC 600)
    - RISC OS 3.60 (Risc PC 700)
    - RISC OS 3.70 (StrongARM Risc PC)
    - RISC OS 3.71 (StrongARM Risc PC J233)
    - RISC OS 4.03 (Kinetic Risc PC)
  - RISC OS 4, RISC OS Select, RISC OS Adjust and RISC OS 6 are available from RISCOS Ltd as a replacement for the Acorn-implemented versions.
  - RISC OS 5 from RISC OS Open with the CPU running in 32-bit mode.
  - Linux
  - NetBSD
- Case: Designed by industrial designer Allen Boothroyd of Cambridge Product Design (designer of the BBC Micro case). Custom plastic-based design with a 'slice' feature which allows extra case modules to be added to increase internal expansion space. Each slice adds two podule bays at the rear, and two drive bays (one 3.5-inch, one 5.25-inch) at the front, covered by a retractable flap to hide cosmetic inconsistencies in hue. Some slices were internally sprayed with nickel paint to meet electromagnetic and radio emissions regulations.
- CD-ROM drive: Optional extra, offering limited compatibility with multimedia PC CD-ROMs.
- Ports: RS-232 serial, parallel, PS/2 keyboard, Acorn mouse, headphone audio out, DE15 VGA, network (optional).
- Additional configurations:
  - Hydra multi-processor development system from Simtec. This plugged into the front processor slot and propagated the two original slots from the standard Risc PC, adding five extra slots, four being used by processor cards (these being the existing ARM610 or ARM710 cards at that time) with one slot accepting a static RAM card acting as a cache or shared memory. The Hydra card provided arbitration logic to manage the multiprocessor functionality, avoiding the need for each processor card to have such logic (as was the case with the 486 processor card which had an ASIC for this purpose), thus providing the hardware basis of a multiprocessing solution for the Risc PC. Simtec were considering TAOS and Helios as potential operating systems to make use of the card.
- Dimensions: 117 (182 for two centre-sections) × 355 × 384 mm (H×W×D).

== Use ==
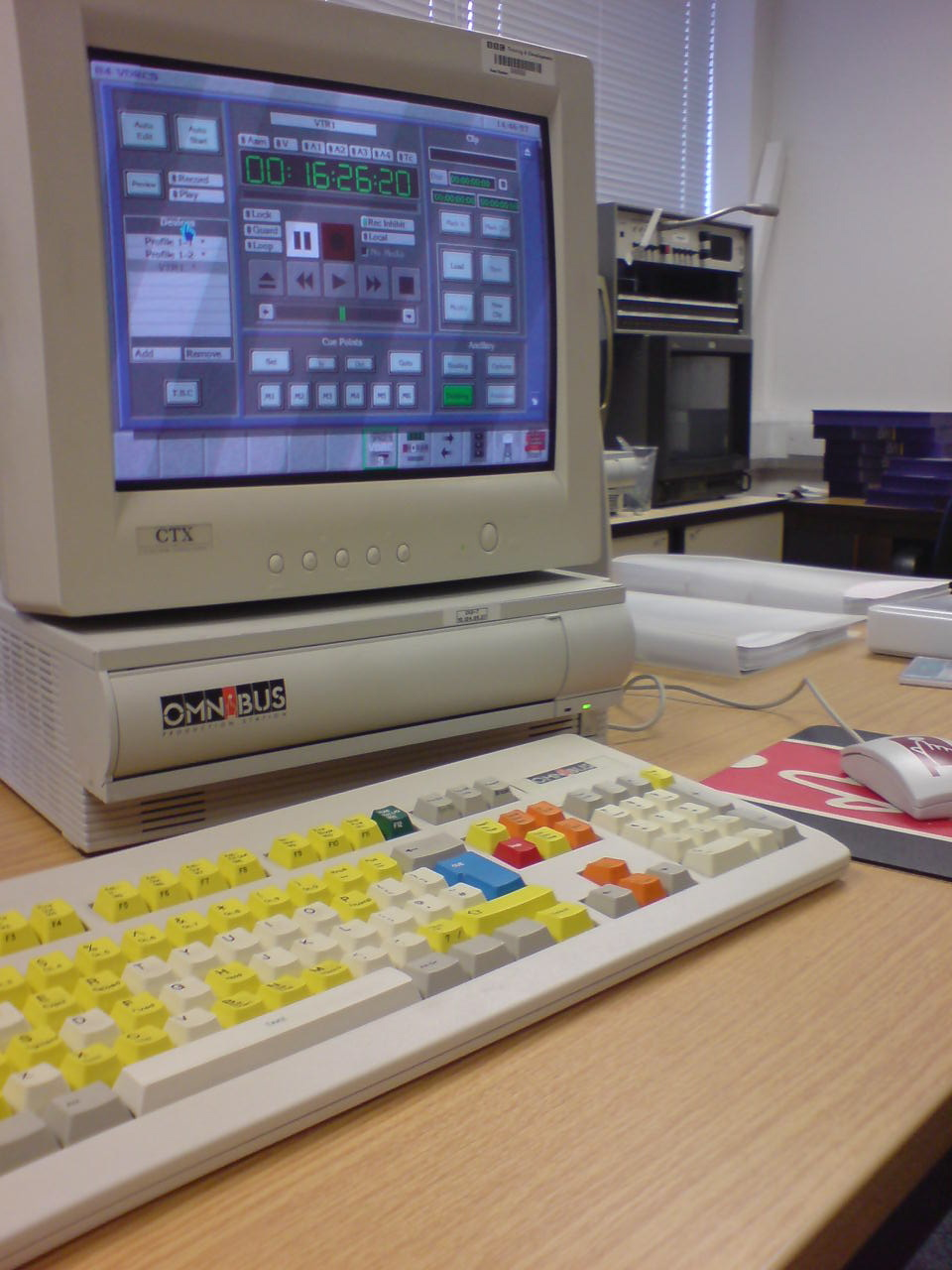
Customised Risc PC, running OmniBus Systems's OUI software, shown here in a training centre

The Risc PC was used by music composers and scorewriters to run the Sibelius scorewriting software.

Between 1994 and 2008, the Risc PC and A7000+ were used in television for broadcast automation, programmed by the UK company OmniBus Systems: once considered "the world leader in television station automation" and at one point automating "every national news programme on terrestrial television in the United Kingdom". The Risc PC, in the form of the OmniBus Workstation, and a customised version of the A7000+ built into a 19-inch rack mount unit, known as the OmniBus Interface Unit, were used to control/automate multiple television broadcast devices from other manufacturers in a way that was unusual at the time. In 2002, OmniBus products were "in constant use worldwide at nearly 100 broadcasters" including the BBC and ITN.

== Timeline ==
- 1994 – Risc PC 600 launched, featuring a 30 MHz ARM610 CPU.
- 1995 – 40 MHz ARM710 CPU upgrade and Risc PC 700 model launched.
- 1996 – 200 MHz StrongARM CPU upgrade released, offering a five-fold increase in raw processing power compared to the ARM7 used in the previous high-end machines.
- 1997 – Acorn launch Acorn J233 StrongARM Risc PC, featuring an uprated 233 MHz model of StrongARM and including Browser and Java software.
- 1998 – Castle Technology acquire the rights to continue to market and produce the Risc PC during the breakup of Acorn Computers.
- 2000 – In May, Castle Technology reveal the Kinetic Risc PC range which included a faster processor card with onboard memory.
- 2001 – Viewfinder Podule, AGP adapter allows the use of IBM PC clone AGP graphics cards (e.g. a range of ATI Rage and Radeon).
- 2003 – Castle Technology announce the end of production and sale of the Risc PC.

== Risc PC 2 ==
Acorn set about designing the Risc PC 2, later renamed to Phoebe 2100 – a design with a 64 MHz front-side bus, PCI slots, and a yellow NLX form-factor case. Slated for release in late 1998, the project was abandoned just before completion, when Acorn's workstation division was closed. Only two prototypes were ever built, and one was publicly displayed for historical interest at the RISC OS 2001 show in Berkshire, England. The remaining cases were bought by CTA Direct who sold them off to the public.

== After Acorn ==
In 2003 it was confirmed that no more Risc PCs would be produced. However RISC OS computers based on other ARM processors machines have been manufactured by companies since this date.

- Castle Technology – Iyonix PC based on the Intel XScale ARM processor and PCI bus
- Advantage Six – A9home based on the Samsung S3C2440 ARM processor
- RiscStation – R7500 based on the ARM7500-FE processor

Significantly better performance has been reached on the aged Risc PC design by using the newer 203 (and later 236) MHz StrongARM CPU, using third-party video cards, overclocking, and having specially designed CPU cards with RAM located upon them to sidestep the speed bottleneck of the slow system bus.

== Limitations ==
The 16 MHz front-side bus is usually recognised as being the most significant fault of the computer; and the arrival of the (five times faster) StrongARM processor in 1996 meant that the Risc PC had a CPU significantly faster than the computer had been designed for. Acorn had originally expected ARM CPUs to progress from the 30 MHz ARM6 to the 40 MHz ARM7, and then onto the ARM8 cores, which at the time were clocked at around 50–80 MHz. In 2000, Castle released "Kinetic", a new StrongARM processor board with its own onboard memory slots augmenting main memory, reducing the need to negotiate the slow front-side bus for memory accesses.

The podule bus on the Risc PC can achieve a maximum data throughput of approximately 6100 KByte/s. It is 32-bit and Risc PC predecessors have a 16-bit bus. For comparison, the PCI bus, which was available in systems at the time of the Risc PC's introduction, is over 20 times faster. The transfer of 650 MB would take 2 minutes via podule, compared to 5 seconds via PCI.

== See also ==
- Acorn A7000
