= ISEE (company) =

Spanish technology company

ISEE 2007 S.L.
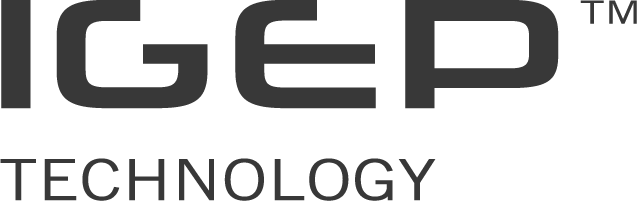
- Company type: Private
- Industry: Computer systems
- Founded: 2006
- Headquarters: Valldoreix, Catalonia, Spain
- Key people: Manel Caro, CEO
- Products: Complete embedded systems, IGEPv2, IGEP COM MODULE and other computer-on-modules, a series of I/O expansion boards, development kits with accessories, IGEP Radar Technology
- Number of employees: Under 25
- Website: www.isee.biz

ISEE is a European multinational company that designs and manufactures small computer-on-modules (COMs), single-board computers, expansion boards, radars and other embedded systems. The abbreviation of ISEE refers to Integration, Software & Electronics Engineering. Their products are based on the IGEP Technology, the ISEE Generic Enhanced Platform using Texas Instruments OMAP processors.

Some of their products, including IGEPv2 and IGEP COM MODULE, are open hardware, licensed under a Creative Commons Attribution-Non Commercial-Share-alike 3.0 unported license.

== Products ==
ISEE products have been used in various industrial and commercial projects such automotive and transportation applications, medical devices, vending machines, security and protection, robotics and radar applications under the commercial brand name of IGEP Technology.

All IGEP products include pre-installed Linux-based distributions with functional software and other resources such developing tools, IDEs, schematics, mechanical drawings, hardware manuals and software manuals. Other tutorials, articles, FAQs and a public GIT repository are also available by the IGEP Community, a collaborative user support community.

== IGEP processor boards ==
=== IGEPv2 ===
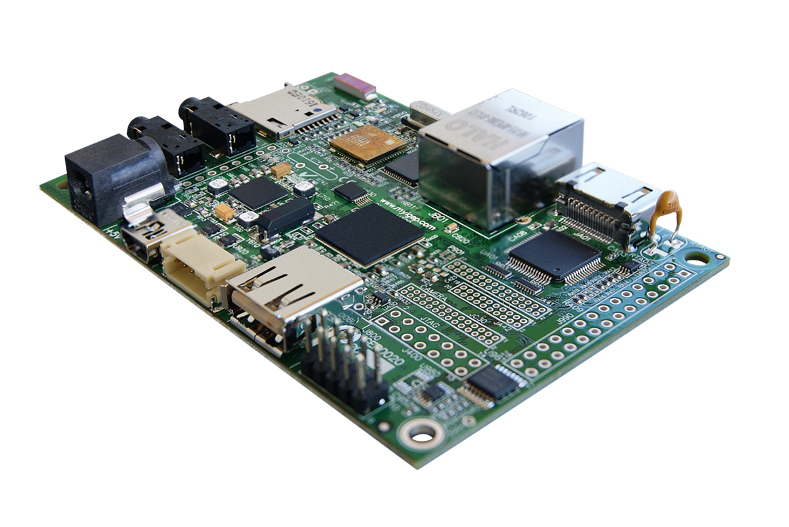
IGEPv2 Board

IGEPv2 was released in 2009. It consists of a low-power, fanless, industrial single-board computer (SBC) based on the Texas Instruments DM3730 ARM Cortex-A8 processor in a 65mm x 95mm board. IGEPv2 was the first open hardware IGEP Processor Board from ISEE and may be used to evaluate IGEP Technology, develop full-fledged product prototypes or can be completely customized by the user thanks to the freely available schematics.

=== IGEPv5 ===
IGEPv5 was presented in September 2013. It is based on the Texas Instruments OMAP5 SoC, which uses a dual-core ARM Cortex-A15 CPU. IGEPv5 allows additional connectivity via its on-board connectors and can be used to develop applications with advanced multimedia requirements.

=== IGEP COM PROTON ===
IGEP COM PROTON was released in 2010. It provides the same processor and performance as IGEPv2 but without most of its on-board connectors, so it results in a smaller industrial form factor. There are four connectors of 70 pins for extended connectivity and measures 35mm x 51,2mm.

=== IGEP COM MODULE ===
IGEP COM MODULE was released in 2010. It measures 18mm x 68,5mm and is the smallest computer-on-module (COM) released by ISEE and features Texas Instruments DM3730. It provides USB OTG, Wi-Fi and Bluetooth on-board and two connectors of 70 pins for extended connectivity.

=== IGEP COM AQUILA ===
IGEP COM AQUILA was released in 2013. It is based on Texas Instruments AM3354 Cortex-A8 CPU and is the first IGEP Processor Board with standard SO-DIMM size format.

== IGEP Expansion Boards ==
=== IGEPv2 EXPANSION ===
IGEPv2 EXPANSION was released in 2009. It adds connectivity to IGEPv2 Processor Board (RS232, VGA Output, CAN interface and GSM/GPRS Modem).

=== IGEP PARIS ===
IGEP PARIS was released in 2010. It consists of an Expansion Board for IGEP COM MODULE and IGEP COM PROTON with basic functional connectivity (Ethernet, UARTs, TFT Video interface and USB).

=== IGEP BERLIN ===
IGEP BERLIN was released in 2010. It is based on IGEP PARIS connectivity with extended connectivity (DVI video, stereo audio in/out, CAN interface, RS485 and other Digital and Analog I/O).

=== IGEP NEW YORK ===
IGEP NEW YORK is the simplest expansion board for IGEP COM MODULE and IGEP COM PROTON with two 2.54-inch DIP connectors.

== IGEP Radar Technology ==
ISEE presented their Radar Technology in 2009. It consists of a 24 GHz band FMCW Radar Technology for IGEPv2 and IGEP COM MODULE, that carry the digital processing and implement the communication with the user system. Later, they manufactured IGEP Radar Lambda, and IGEP Radar Epsilon.

== Pre-installed software ==
The pre-installed demo software on all ISEE products consists of:

- IGEP X-Loader: a bootloader compatible with all IGEP processor boards
- IGEP Kernel: a Linux Kernel maintained by ISEE and IGEP community members
- IGEP Firmware Yocto: a Linux Distribution with an X Window System and GNOME mobile-based applications created with Yocto Platform Builder

Additional software and firmware releases can be downloaded prebuilt directly from the IGEP Community GIT repositories or compiled using OpenEmbedded software framework.

== Development tools ==
ISEE offers free development tools and resources for developing under IGEP Technology:

- IGEP SDK Yocto Toolchain: provides all necessary tools like a cross-compiler, embedded libraries, etc. to compile program sources for IGEP devices.
- IGEP SDK Virtual Machine: a virtual machine that includes all the developer tools for IGEP Technology, which are already installed and configured.
- IGEP DSP Gstreamer Framework: based on TI DVSDK it provides all DSP essential packages and the "gstreamer DSP plugin".

== See also ==
- IGEPv2
- Gumstix
- PandaBoard
- Mobile Robot Programming Toolkit
- Raspberry Pi
- Arduino
