= OMAP =

Texas Instruments image/video processors

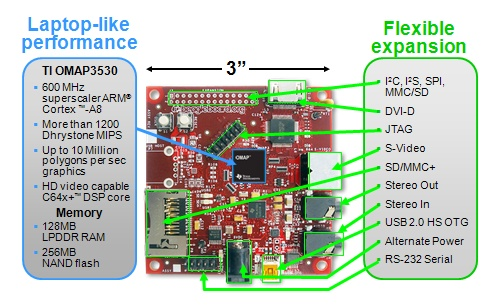
A BeagleBoard featuring a TI OMAP3530 at its core

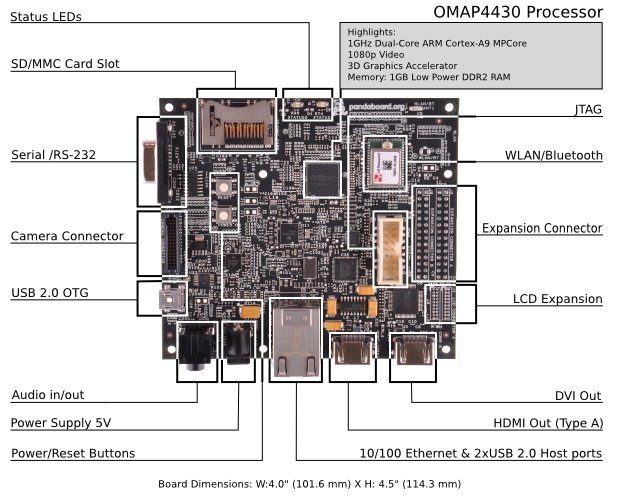
TI OMAP4430 on PandaBoard

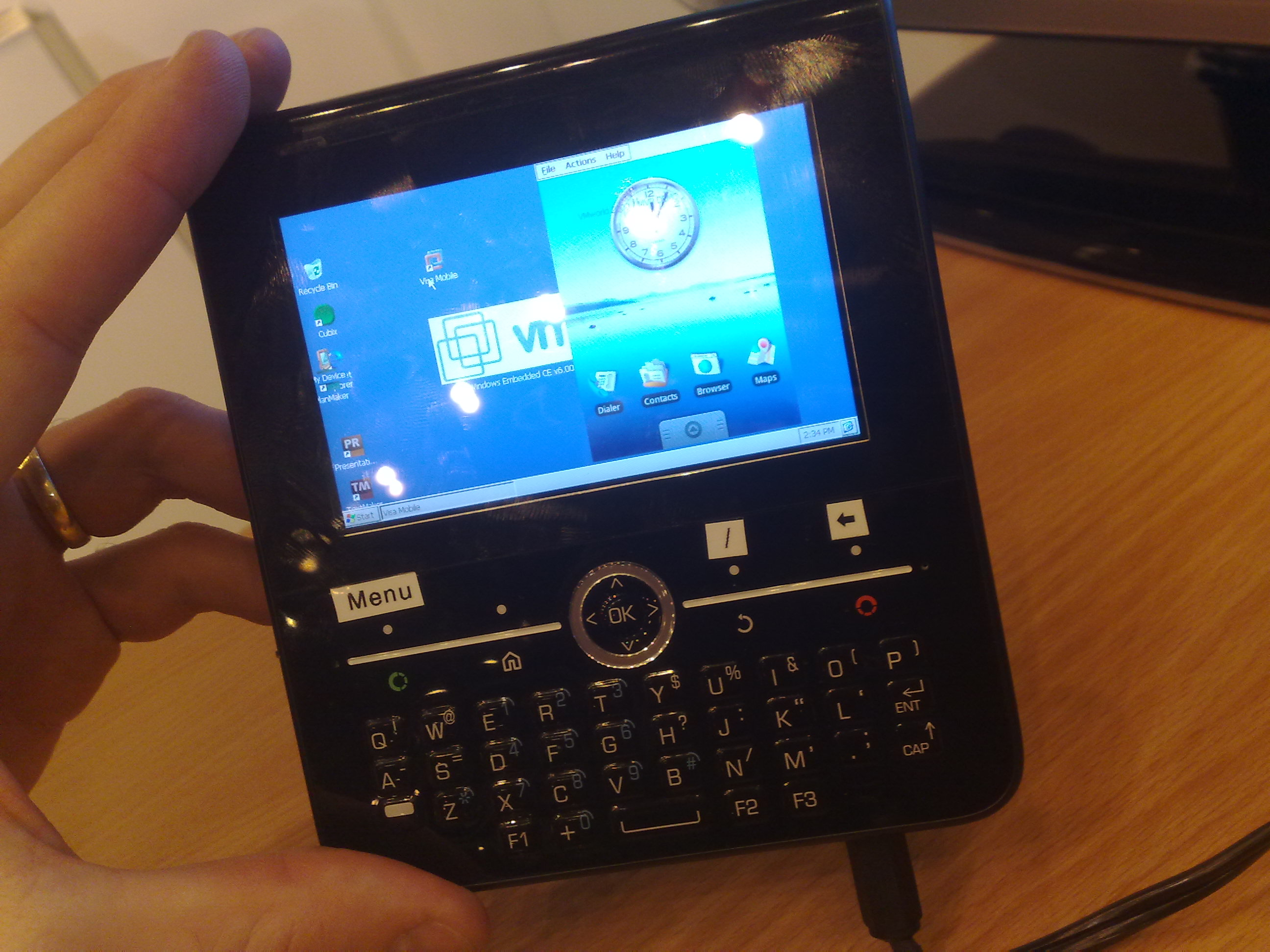
TI's Zoom2 reference hardware based on the OMAP 3430 processor

OMAP (Open Multimedia Applications Platform) is a family of image/video processors that was developed by Texas Instruments. They are proprietary system on chips (SoCs) for portable and mobile multimedia applications. OMAP devices generally include a general-purpose ARM architecture processor core plus one or more specialized co-processors. Earlier OMAP variants commonly featured a variant of the Texas Instruments TMS320 series digital signal processor.

The platform was created after December 12, 2002, as STMicroelectronics and Texas Instruments jointly announced an initiative for Open Mobile Application Processor Interfaces (OMAPI) intended to be used with 2.5 and 3G mobile phones, that were going to be produced during 2003. (This was later merged into a larger initiative and renamed the MIPI Alliance.) The OMAP was Texas Instruments' implementation of this standard. (The STMicroelectronics implementation was named Nomadik.)

OMAP enjoyed some success in the smartphone and tablet market until 2011 when it lost ground to Qualcomm Snapdragon. On September 26, 2012, Texas Instruments announced that they would wind down their operations in smartphone and tablet oriented chips and focus on embedded platforms instead. On November 14, 2012, Texas Instruments announced they would cut 1,700 jobs due to their shift from mobile to embedded platforms. The last OMAP5 chips were released in Q2 2013.

== OMAP family ==
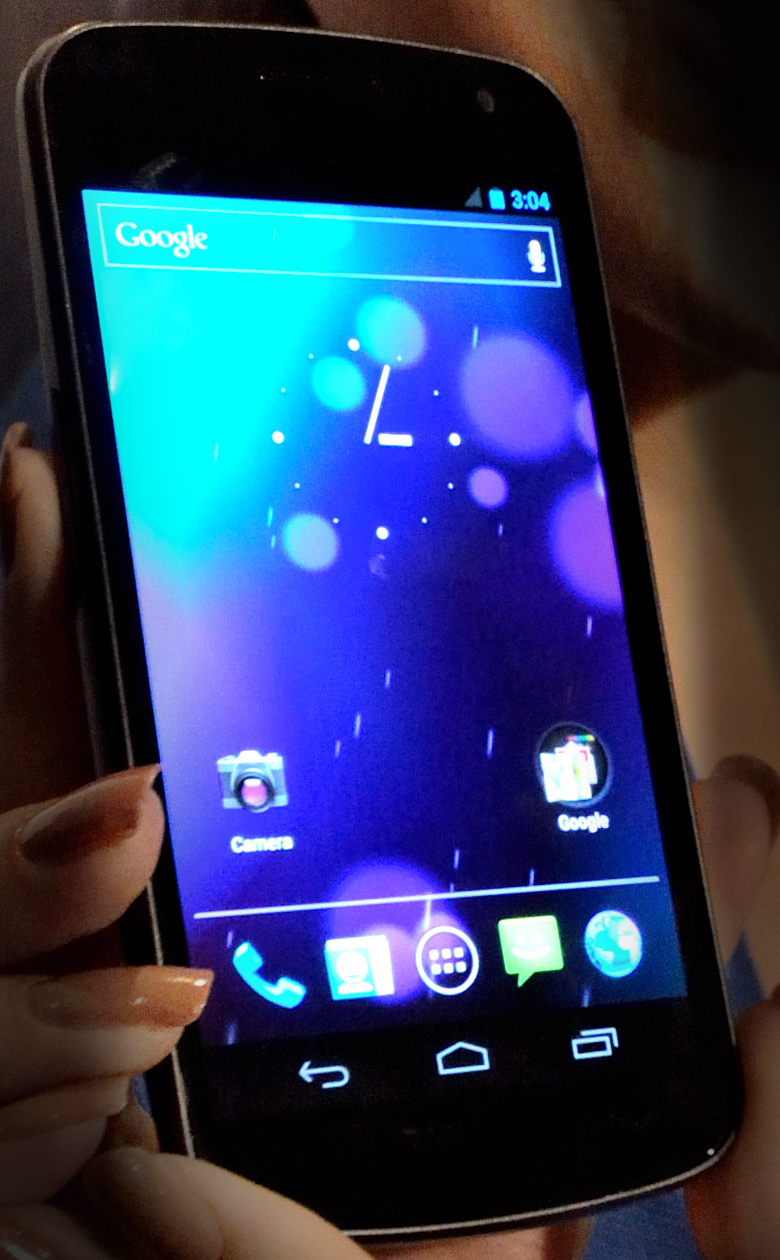
The Galaxy Nexus, example of a smartphone with an OMAP 4460 SoC

The OMAP family consists of three product groups classified by performance and intended application:

- high-performance applications processors
- basic multimedia applications processors
- integrated modem and applications processors

Further, two main distribution channels exist, and not all parts are available in both channels. The genesis of the OMAP product line is from partnership with cell phone vendors, and the main distribution channel involves sales directly to such wireless handset vendors. Parts developed to suit evolving cell phone requirements are flexible and powerful enough to support sales through less specialized catalog channels; some OMAP 1 parts, and many OMAP 3 parts, have catalog versions with different sales and support models. Parts that are obsolete from the perspective of handset vendors may still be needed to support products developed using catalog parts and distributor-based inventory management.

=== High-performance applications processors ===
These are parts originally intended for use as application processors in smartphones, with processors powerful enough to run significant operating systems (such as Linux, FreeBSD, Android or Symbian), support connectivity to personal computers, and support various audio and video applications.

==== OMAP 1 ====
The OMAP 1 family started with a TI-enhanced ARM925 core (ARM925T), and then changed to a standard ARM926 core. It included many variants, most easily distinguished according to manufacturing technology (130 nm except for the OMAP171x series), CPU, peripheral set, and distribution channel (direct to large handset vendors, or through catalog-based distributors). In March 2009, the OMAP1710 family chips are still available to handset vendors.

Products using OMAP 1 processors include hundreds of cell phone models, Palm PDAs, and the Nokia 770 Internet tablets.

- OMAP1510 – 168 MHz ARM925T (TI-enhanced) + C55x DSP
- OMAP310/311 – 126 MHz ARM925T (TI-enhanced), no DSP
- OMAP161x – 204 MHz ARM926EJ-S + C55x DSP, 130 nm technology
- OMAP162x – 204 MHz ARM926EJ-S + C55x DSP + 2 MB internal SRAM, 130 nm technology
- OMAP171x – 220 MHz ARM926EJ-S + C55x DSP, low-voltage 90 nm technology
- OMAP5910 – catalog availability version of OMAP 1510
- OMAP5912 – catalog availability version of OMAP1621 (or OMAP1611b in older versions)

==== OMAP 2 ====
These parts were only marketed to handset vendors. Products using these include both Internet tablets and mobile phones:

Model number	Fab (nm)	CPU	Frq (MHz)	DSP	GPU
OMAP2420	Unknown	ARM1136	330MHz	TMS320C55x @220 MHz	PowerVR MBX
OMAP2431	90nm	ARM1136	330MHz	TMS320C64x @220 MHz	Unknown
OMAP2430	90nm	ARM1136	330MHz	TMS320C64x @220 MHz	PowerVR MBX Lite

==== OMAP 3 ====
The 3rd generation OMAP, the OMAP 3 is broken into 3 distinct groups: the OMAP34x, the OMAP35x, and the OMAP36x. OMAP34x and OMAP36x are distributed directly to large handset (such as cell phone) manufacturers. OMAP35x is a variant of OMAP34x intended for catalog distribution channels. The OMAP36x is a 45 nm version of the 65 nm OMAP34x with higher clock speed.

The OMAP 3611 found in devices like the Bookeen's Cybook Odyssey is a licensed crippled version of the OMAP 3621, both are the same silicon (as marking are the same) but officially the 3611 was sold to be only able to drive e-Ink screen and does not have access to IVA & DSP.

The video technology in the higher end OMAP 3 parts is derived in part from the DaVinci product line, which first packaged higher end C64x+ DSPs and image processing controllers with ARM9 processors last seen in the older OMAP 1 generation or ARM Cortex-A8.

Not highlighted in the list below is that each OMAP 3 SoC has an "Image, Video, Audio" (IVA2) accelerator. These units do not all have the same capabilities. Most devices support 12 megapixel camera images, though some support 5 or 3 megapixels. Some support HD imaging.

Model number	Fab	CPU	Frq (MHz)	GPU	DSP	HSA-features	Utilizing devices
OMAP3410	65 nm	Cortex-A8	600	PowerVR SGX530	Unknown	Unknown	List: Motorola Charm, Motorola Flipside (720 MHz), Motorola Flipout
OMAP3420	65 nm	Cortex-A8	600	PowerVR SGX530	Unknown	Unknown	
OMAP3430	65 nm	Cortex-A8	600	PowerVR SGX530	TMS320C64x+	Unknown	List: Motorola Droid/Milestone, Nokia N900, Olio Model One Smartwatch, Palm Pre, Samsung Vodafone 360 H1, Samsung Vodafone 360 M1, Samsung i8910 Omnia HD, Sony Ericsson Satio
OMAP3440	65 nm	Cortex-A8	800	PowerVR SGX530	Unknown	Unknown	List: Archos 5 (Gen 7), Motorola Milestone XT720, Motorola Titanium XT800, Samsung Galaxy A (SHW-M100S), Samsung i7680
OMAP3503	65 nm	Cortex-A8	600	-	Unknown	Unknown	List: Gumstix Overo Earth
OMAP3515	65 nm	Cortex-A8	600	PowerVR SGX530	Unknown	Unknown	
OMAP3525	65 nm	Cortex-A8	600	-	Unknown	Unknown	
OMAP3530	65 nm	Cortex-A8	720 MHz	PowerVR SGX530	TMS320C64x+	Unknown	List: Alico's Kinetic 3500, Always Innovating Touch Book, BeagleBoard, Embest DevKit8000, Gumstix Overo Water, IGEPv2, OpenSourceMID K7 MID, Oswald, Overo Water, Pandora, phyCARD-L OMAP-3530 SOM, TianyeIT CIP312
OMAP3611	45 nm	Cortex-A8	800	PowerVR SGX530	TMS320C64x+	Unknown	List: Cybook Odyssey
OMAP3621	45 nm	Cortex-A8	800	PowerVR SGX530	TMS320C64x+	Unknown	List: Barnes & Noble Nook Color, Barnes & Noble Nook Simple Touch, Lenovo IdeaPad A1, Motorola Defy, Motorola Defy Plus
OMAP3622	45 nm	Cortex-A8	1000	PowerVR SGX530	TMS320C64x+	Unknown	List: Barnes & Noble Nook Color, Barnes & Noble Nook Simple Touch, Lenovo IdeaPad A1, Motorola Defy, Motorola Defy Plus
OMAP3630	45 nm	Cortex-A8	600 MHz~1.2 GHz	PowerVR SGX530	Unknown	Unknown	List: 3630-600 Motorola MOTOACTV; 3630-800 Archos 28, Archos 32, Motorola Bravo, Motorola Defy; 3630-1000 Archos 43, Archos 70, Archos 101, LG Optimus Black, LG Optimus Bright, LG Optimus Mach, Motorola Cliq 2, Motorola Droid 2 R2D2 Special Edition, Motorola Droid X, Motorola Defy+, Nokia N9, Nokia N950, Palm Pre 2, Panasonic P-07C, Panasonic Sweety 003P, Samsung Galaxy SL, Sony Ericsson Vivaz, Lenovo A1-07 Samsung Galaxy Player 4.2 (YP-GI1),Le Pan TC970, Moto 360 watch
OMAP3640	45 nm	Cortex-A8	1.2 GHz	PowerVR SGX530	Unknown	Unknown	List: Motorola Droid 2 Global

==== OMAP 4 ====
The TI Ducati SIP core does video acceleration and accelerated image processing.

The OMAP 4 line consists of the OMAP 4430, OMAP 4460 (formerly named 4440), and OMAP 4470. The 4th generation OMAPs have a dual-core ARM Cortex-A9 CPU with two ARM Cortex-M3 cores, as part of the "Ducati" sub-system for off-loading low-level tasks. The OMAP 4430 was the SoC used in Google Glass.

OMAP 4 uses ARM Cortex-A9's with ARM's SIMD engine (Media Processing Engine, aka NEON) which in some cases may have a significant performance advantage over Nvidia Tegra 2's ARM Cortex-A9s with non-vector floating point units. It also uses a dual-channel LPDDR2 memory controller compared to Nvidia Tegra 2's single-channel memory controller.

All OMAP 4 processors come with an IVA3 multimedia hardware accelerator with a programmable DSP that enables 1080p Full HD and multi-standard video encoding and decoding.

The 4430 and 4460 use a PowerVR SGX540 graphics processing unit (GPU). The 4430's GPU runs at a clock frequency of 304 Mhz, and the 4460's GPU runs at 384 MHz.

The 4470 has a PowerVR SGX544 GPU that supports DirectX 9 that enables it for use in Windows 8. It also has a dedicated 2D graphics core for increased power efficiency up to 50-90%.

SoC		CPU			GPU	DSP	Image & Video acceleration	Memory technology			Availability	Devices
Model	Fab	Microarchitecture	# Cores	Frq (GHz)	GPU	DSP	Image & Video acceleration	Type	Bus width (bit)	Bandwidth (GB/s)	Availability	Devices
OMAP4430	45 nm	Cortex-A9	2	1–1.2	PowerVR SGX540 @ 304–365 MHz	"Tesla" (C64T)	"Ducati": dual Cortex-M3@266 MHz & IVA–HD & ISS	LPDDR2	32-bit dual-channel	7.4	Q1 2011	List: Japanese Market:Fujitsu Arrows Tab LTE F-01D, Fujitsu Arrows X LTE F-05D, Fujitsu Arrows Z ISW11F, Panasonic Lumix Phone 101P, Panasonic Lumix Phone P-02D, Fujitsu Regza Phone T-01D, Sharp Aquos Phone SH-01D, Sharp Aquos Phone 102SH, Toshiba AT200 Excite Global market: BlackBerry PlayBook, Panasonic Eluga DL1, LG Prada 3.0, LG Optimus 3D P920, LG Optimus 3D Max, LG Optimus L9, Motorola Atrix 2, Motorola Droid 3/Milestone 3, Motorola Droid Bionic, Motorola Droid RAZR, Motorola Xyboard, PandaBoard, phyCORE-OMAP4460/OMAP4430 SOM, Samsung Galaxy S II (GT-I9100G), Samsung Galaxy Tab 2 (7.0), Samsung Galaxy Tab 2 (10.1), TianyeIT CIP411, LGP925 Thrill AT&T, Amazon Kindle Fire, Archos 80 (Gen 9), Archos 101 (Gen 9), Barnes and Noble Nook Tablet, Archos 80 Turbo (Gen 9) 1.0/1.2 GHz, Archos 101 Turbo (Gen 9) 1.0/1.2 GHz, SmartDevices SmartQ Ten3 (T15), Google Glass, Sony NWZ-ZX1, NWZ-ZX2
OMAP4460	45 nm	Cortex-A9	2	1.2–1.5	PowerVR SGX540 @ 307–384 MHz	"Tesla" (C64T)	"Ducati": dual Cortex-M3@266 MHz & IVA–HD & ISS	LPDDR2	32-bit dual-channel	7.4	Q4 2011	List: Samsung Galaxy Nexus, Archos 80 Turbo (Gen 9) 1.5 GHz & 1.2 GHz, Archos 101 Turbo (Gen 9) 1.5 GHz & 1.2 GHz, Huawei Ascend D1, Huawei Ascend P1/P1S, Pandaboard ES, Sharp Aquos Phone 104SH, Variscite VAR-SOM-OM44, Nexus Q, BlackBerry Playbook 4G LTE, Kindle Fire HD 7" (1st generation), BlackBerry Dev Alpha
OMAP4470	45 nm	Cortex-A9	2	1.3–1.5	PowerVR SGX544 @ 277–384 MHz + Vivante GC320 (dedicated 2D graphics core)	"Tesla" (C64T)	"Ducati": dual Cortex-M3@266 MHz & IVA–HD & ISS	LPDDR2	32-bit dual-channel	7.4	Q2 2012	List: ARCHOS 101XS, ARCHOS TV Connect, SmartDevices T30, Kindle Fire HD 8.9", Kobo Arc, BlackBerry Dev Alpha B, Samsung Galaxy Premier, Blackberry Z10 (International Market), SmartQ X7, ARCHOS 97XS, Nook HD/HD+, Kindle Fire HD 7" (2nd generation)

==== OMAP 5 ====
The 5th generation OMAP, OMAP 5 SoC uses a dual-core ARM Cortex-A15 CPU with two additional Cortex-M4 cores to offload the A15s in less computationally intensive tasks to increase power efficiency, two PowerVR SGX544MP graphics cores and a dedicated TI 2D BitBlt graphics accelerator, a multi-pipe display sub-system and a signal processor. They respectively support 24 and 20 megapixel cameras for front and rear 3D HD video recording. The chip also supports up to 8 GB of dual channel LPDDR2/DDR3 memory, output to four HD 3D displays and 3D HDMI 1.4 video output. OMAP 5 also includes three USB 2.0 ports, one lowspeed USB 3.0 OTG port and a SATA 2.0 controller.

Model number	Fab	CPU	Frq	GPU	Frq	DSP	Memory technology	Availability	Utilizing devices
OMAP5430	28 nm	Cortex-A15 (dual-core) and Cortex-M4 (dual-core)	1.5, 1.7 GHz	PowerVR SGX544MP2 + dedicated TI 2D BitBlt graphics accelerator	532 MHz	"Tesla" (C64T)	32-bit dual-channel 532 MHz LPDDR2 (8.5 GB/sec)	Q2 2013	List: Jorjin APM-5
OMAP5432	28 nm	Cortex-A15 (dual-core) and Cortex-M4 (dual-core)	1.5, 1.7 GHz	PowerVR SGX544MP2 + dedicated TI 2D BitBlt graphics accelerator	532 MHz	"Tesla" (C64T)	32-bit dual-channel 532 MHz DDR3 (8.5 GB/sec)	Q2 2013	List: Casio V-R7000/V-R7100, DragonBox Pyra, IGEPv5, Variscite VAR-SOM-OM54 SOM, SVTronics UEVM5432G-02-12-00 Development Board

=== Basic multimedia applications processors ===
GStreamer makes use of hardware acceleration through plugins provided by Texas Instruments. The API is DMAI (DaVinci Multimedia Application Interface).

These are marketed only to handset manufacturers. They are intended to be highly integrated, low cost chips for consumer products. The OMAP-DM series are intended to be used as digital media coprocessors for mobile devices with high megapixel digital still and video cameras. These OMAP-DM chips incorporate both an ARM processor and an Image Signal Processor (ISP) to accelerate processing of camera images.

- OMAP310 – ARM925T
- OMAP331 – ARM926
- OMAP-DM270 – ARM7 + C54x DSP
- OMAP-DM299 – ARM7 + Image Signal Processor (ISP) + stacked mDDR SDRAM
- OMAP-DM500 – ARM7 + ISP + stacked mDDR SDRAM
- OMAP-DM510 – ARM926 + ISP + 128 MB stacked mDDR SDRAM
- OMAP-DM515 – ARM926 + ISP + 256 MB stacked mDDR SDRAM
- OMAP-DM525 – ARM926 + ISP + 256 MB stacked mDDR SDRAM

=== Integrated modem and applications processors ===
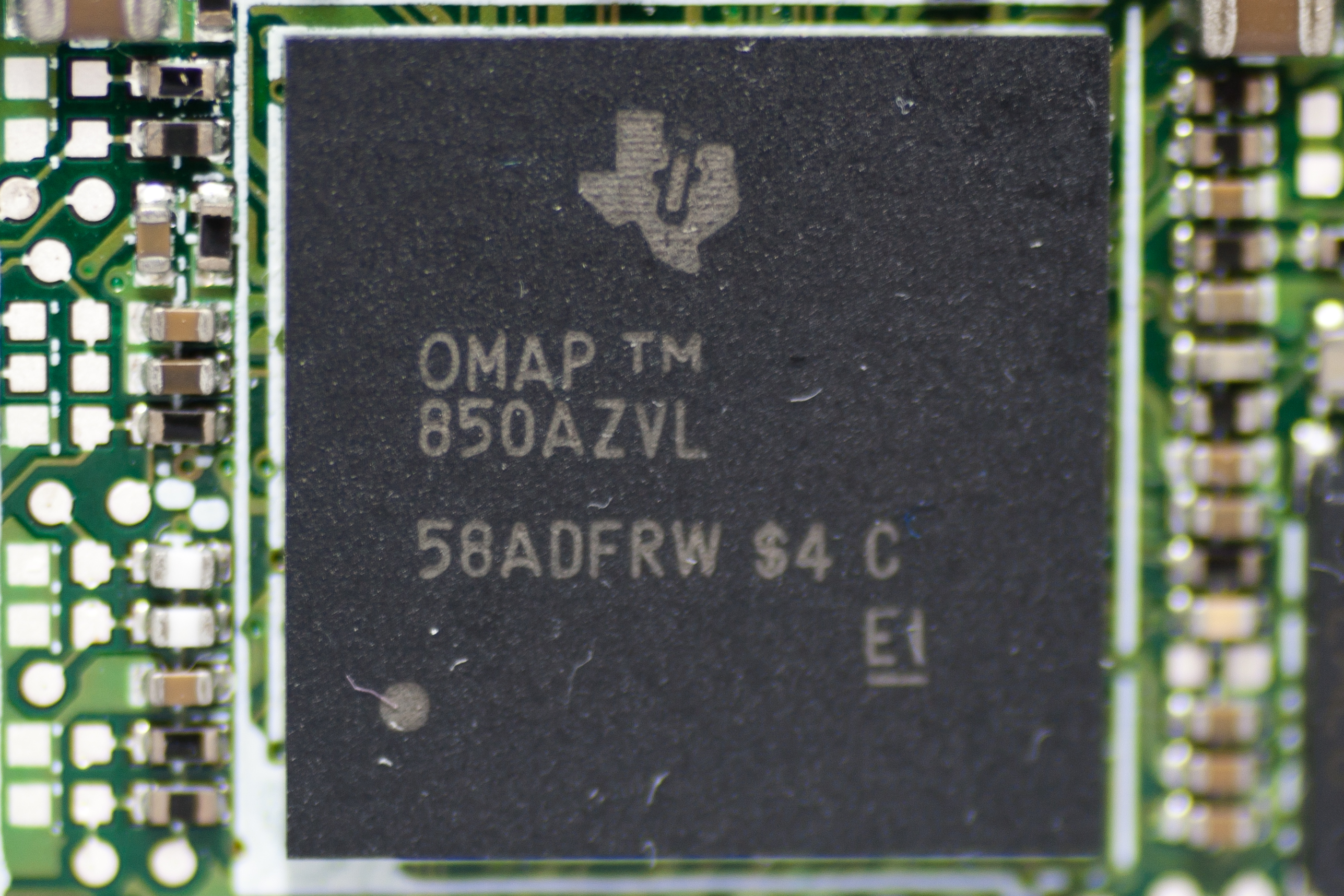
An OMAP 850 in an HTC Wizard

These are marketed only to handset manufacturers. Many of the newer versions are highly integrated for use in very low cost cell phones.

- OMAPV1035 – single-chip EDGE (was discontinued in 2009 as TI announced baseband chipset market withdrawal).
- OMAPV1030 – EDGE digital baseband
- OMAP850 – 200 MHz ARM926EJ-S + GSM/GPRS digital baseband + stacked EDGE co-processor
- OMAP750 – 200 MHz ARM926EJ-S + GSM/GPRS digital baseband + DDR Memory support
- OMAP733 – 200 MHz ARM926EJ-S + GSM/GPRS digital baseband + stacked SDRAM
- OMAP730 – 200 MHz ARM926EJ-S + GSM/GPRS digital baseband + SDRAM Memory support
- OMAP710 – 133 MHz ARM925 + GSM/GPRS digital baseband

=== OMAP L-1x ===
The OMAP L-1x parts are marketed only through catalog channels, and have a different technological heritage than the other OMAP parts. Rather than deriving directly from cell phone product lines, they grew from the video-oriented DaVinci product line by removing the video-specific features while using upgraded DaVinci peripherals. A notable feature is use of a floating point DSP, instead of the more customary fixed point one.

The Hawkboard uses the OMAP-L138

- OMAP-L137 – 300 MHz ARM926EJ-S + C674x floating point DSP
- OMAP-L138 – 300 MHz ARM926EJ-S + C674x floating point DSP

== Products using OMAP processors ==
Many mobile phones released during early 21st century have used OMAP SoCs, including the Nokia 3230, N9, N90, N91, N92, N95, N82, E61, E62, E63 and E90 mobile phones, as well as the Nokia 770, N800, N810 and N900 Internet tablets, Motorola Droid, Droid X, and Droid 2, and some early Samsung Galaxy devices, like Samsung Galaxy Tab 2 7.0 and Galaxy S II variant GT-I9100G.

The OMAP3430 is used in the Palm Pre, Pandora, and Touch Book. Other devices that use OMAP processors include Sony Ericsson's Satio (Idou) and Vivaz, most Samsung phones running Symbian (including Omnia HD), the Nook Color, some Archos tablets (such as Archos 80 gen 9 and Archos 101 gen 9), Kindle Fire HD, Blackberry Playbook, Kobo Arc, and B&N Nook HD.

Some all-in-one smart displays use OMAP 4 SoCs, including the Viewsonic VSD220, which uses an OMAP 4430.

OMAP SoCs are also used as the basis for a number of hobbyist, prototyping and evaluation boards, such as the BeagleBoard, PandaBoard, OMAP3 Board, Gumstix and Presonus digital mixing boards

Motorola MOTOTRBO 2. generation radios use the OMAP-L132 or OMAP-L138 secure CPU.

== Similar platforms ==
- A31 by AllWinner
- Apple silicon by Apple
- ARMADA (SoC) 5xx/6xx/15xx by Marvell Technology Group
- Atom by Intel
- Exynos by Samsung
- i.MX by Freescale Semiconductor, later models produced by NXP
- Jaguar and Puma by AMD
- K3Vx/Kirin by HiSilicon
- MTxxxx by MediaTek
- Nomadik by STMicroelectronics
- NovaThor by ST-Ericsson
- OCTEON by Cavium
- R-Car by Renesas
- RK3xxx by Rockchip
- Snapdragon, by Qualcomm, the only competing product which also features a DSP unit, the Qualcomm Hexagon
- Swift (SoC) by Philips
- Tegra by Nvidia
- TI Sitara ARM Processor SoC family
- VideoCore by Broadcom

== See also ==
- Comparison of ARMv7-A cores - ARM
- Comparison of ARMv8-A cores - ARM
- Distributed Codec Engine (libcde) – a Texas Instruments API for the video codec engine in OMAP based embedded systems
- HiSilicon – by Huawei
- OpenMAX IL (Open Media Acceleration Integration Layer) – a royalty-free cross-platform media abstraction API from the Khronos Group
