= IGEPv2 =

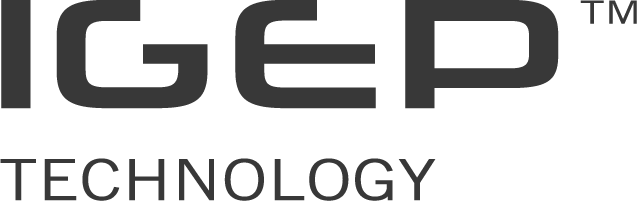

The IGEPv2 board is a low-power, fanless single-board computer based on the OMAP 3 series (also known as Cortex-A8) of ARM-compatible processors. It is developed and produced by Spanish corporation ISEE and is the second IGEP platform in the series. The IGEPv2 is open hardware, licensed under a Creative Commons Attribution-Non Commercial-ShareAlike 3.0 unported license.

== Board specifications ==
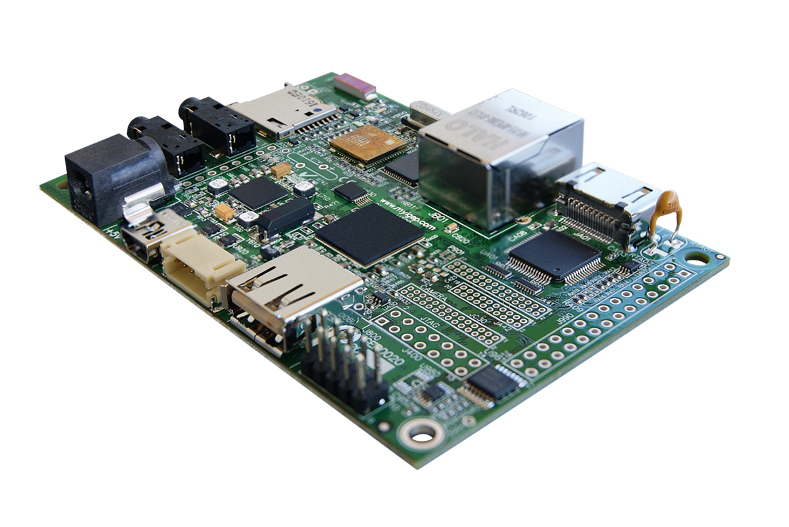
IGEPv2 Board

- Package on package Memory/Processor
  - Texas Instruments OMAP3530 or DM3730 multicore processor
    - 720 MHz (OMAP3530) or 1 GHz (DM3730) ARMv7 Cortex-A8 CPU
    - NEON SIMD coprocessor
    - 110 MHz (OMAP3530) or 200 MHz (DM3730) Imagination Technologies PowerVR SGX530 graphics core
    - IVA2.2 image, video, audio accelerator sub-system
    - 520 MHz (OMAP3530) or 800 MHz (DM3730) TMS320C64x+ DSP core
  - 512MB of NAND flash memory
  - 512MB of LPDDR SDRAM @ 200 MHz
- Peripheral connections
  - Mini AB USB 2.0 OTG host/slave port
  - Type A USB 2.0 host port
  - DVI-D out port using HDMI connector
  - microSD slot with support for SD and SDHC cards
  - Integrated WiFi IEEE 802.11b/g and Bluetooth 2.0 antenna
  - Ethernet 10/100 Mb port
  - 3.5mm standard stereo in and out jacks
- Power
  - 5 V via 3.5 mm barrel DC connector (AC adapter available)
  - JST connector also supported
- Other Expansions
  - Two bicolor user programmable LEDs
  - RS-485 with transceiver
  - UART, McBSP, McSPI, I2C, GPIO
  - Keyboard button matrix
- Debug
  - Console RS-232 port
  - JTAG interface
- Dimensions: 93x65 mm (3.6x2.5 inches)

== Similar products ==
- BeagleBoard - OMAP board from Texas Instruments and Digikey
- OpenPandora - handheld game console that uses Texas Instruments OMAP3530 and DM3730
- Gumstix overo - a similar single-board computer package that uses the OMAP3503 and the OMAP3530
- OSWALD - OMAP3530 application developed by Oregon State University students for computer science education
- EBVBeagle Board - Beagle Board clone from EBV Elektronik.
- Empower Technologies's EMP3503 and EMP3530 - OMAP35x based single-board computers
- FOX Board - a complete Linux system in just 66 x 72 mm, not OMAP based

== See also ==
- Texas Instruments TMS320
- OmapZoom
- OpenEmbedded
