= Huawei Ascend D Quad =

2012 Android smartphone

Huawei Ascend D quad
- Brand: Huawei
- Developer: Huawei
- Manufacturer: Huawei
- Type: Smartphone
- Series: Ascend
- Family: Ascend
- First released: August 2012; 14 years ago
- Compatible networks: GSM 850 / 900 / 1800 / 1900, HSDPA 850 / 900 / 1700 / 1900 / 2100
- Form factor: Touchscreen slate
- Colors: Metallic black; Ceramic white
- Dimensions: 129 mm (5.1 in) H 64.9 mm (2.56 in) W 8.9 mm (0.35 in) D
- Weight: 130 g (4.6 oz)
- Operating system: Android 4.0 (Ice Cream Sandwich)
- System-on-chip: Huawei K3V2
- CPU: Quad-core 1.5 GHz Cortex-A9
- GPU: Vivante GC4000
- Memory: 1 GB
- Storage: 8 GB
- Removable storage: microSDHC (dedicated slot)
- SIM: Mini-SIM
- Battery: Removable Li-Ion 1800 mAh battery
- Rear camera: 8 MP, autofocus, dual-LED flash, 1080p video
- Front camera: 1.3 MP, 720p video
- Display: 4.5 inches, IPS+ LCD (720 x 1280 pixels, ~326 ppi)

The Huawei Ascend D Quad is an Android smartphone model produced starting in 2012 by Huawei.

The smartphone was showcased at MWC 2012 on February 25, 2012. It is notable for being one of the first mobile devices equipped with a quad-core processor.

== Specifications ==
The Huawei Ascend D Quad is powered by the proprietary K3V2 processor featuring a Cortex-A9 quad-core clocking at 1.5 GHz paired with a Vivante GC4000 GPU.

In terms of overall specifications, the smartphone shares many similarities with another Huawei model, the Ascend D1, though it differs in battery capacity by 130 mAh.

Tthe smartphone features an 8-megapixel rear camera with autofocus and dual-LED flash capable of 1080p video recording, alongside a 1.3-megapixel front-facing camera.

== Variants ==
=== Ascend D Quad XL ===
The Quad XL variant features a larger 2600 mAh battery designed to provide up to three to four days of battery life on a single charge. The larger capacity battery resulted in an increased thickness of 10.9 mm (an increase of 2 mm compared to the standard model).
