= PandaBoard =

Single board computer

PandaBoard and PandaBoard ES
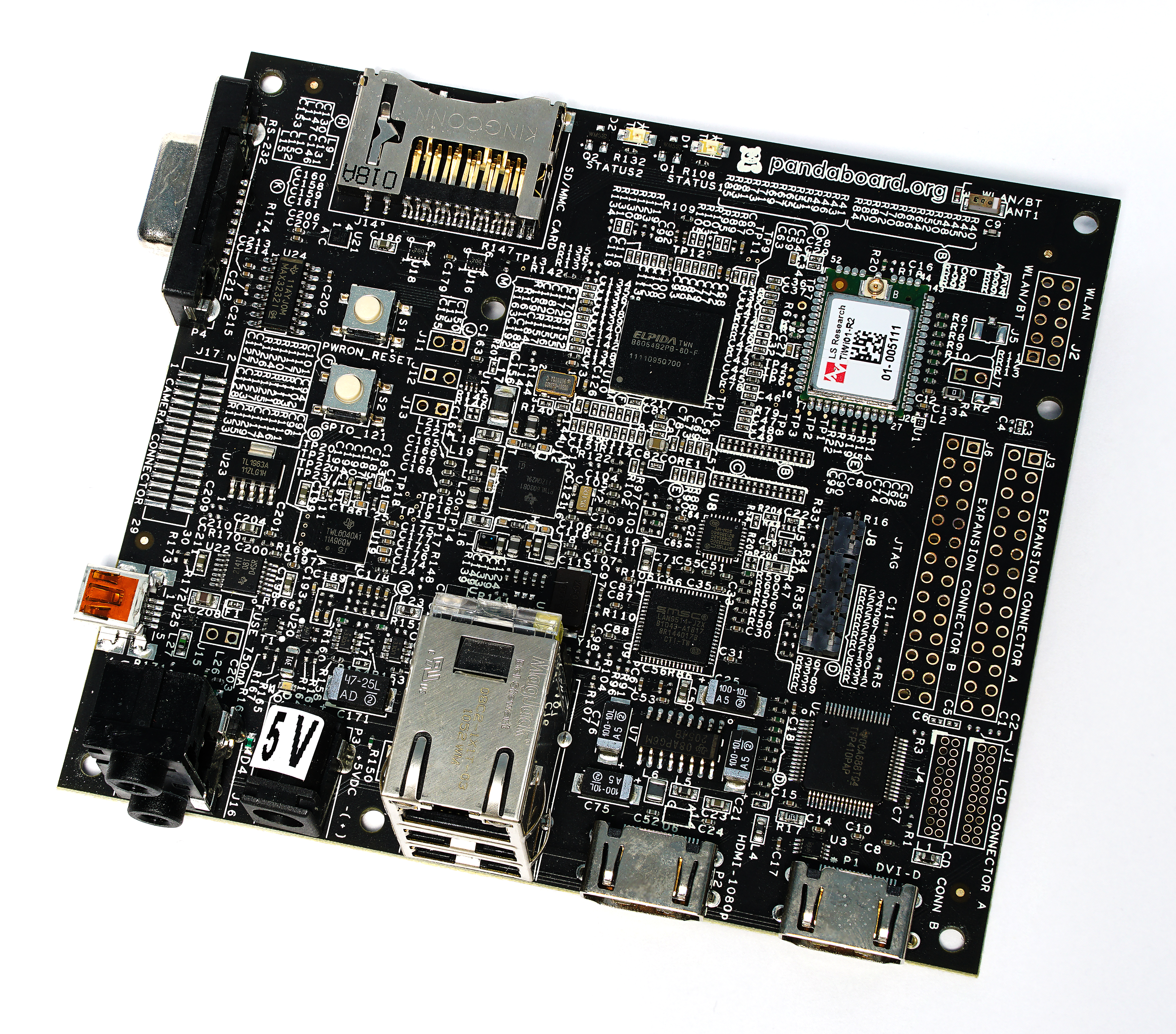
- PandaBoard
- Cost: US$174 (PandaBoard); US$182 (PandaBoard ES)
- Type: Single-board computer
- Processor: ARM Cortex-A9 MPCore
- Frequency: 1 GHz (PandaBoard); 1.2 GHz (PandaBoard ES)
- Memory: 1 GiB
- Weight: 74 g (PandaBoard); 81.5 g (PandaBoard ES)
- Dimensions: 4.5 by 4.0 inches (114.3 mm × 101.6 mm)

The PandaBoard was a low-power single-board computer development platform based on the Texas Instruments OMAP4430 system on a chip (SoC). The board has been available to the public at the subsidized price of US$174 since 27 October 2010. It is a community supported development platform.

The PandaBoard ES is a newer version based on the OMAP4460 SoC, with the CPU and GPU running at higher clock rates. Like its predecessor, it is a community supported development platform.

== Features ==
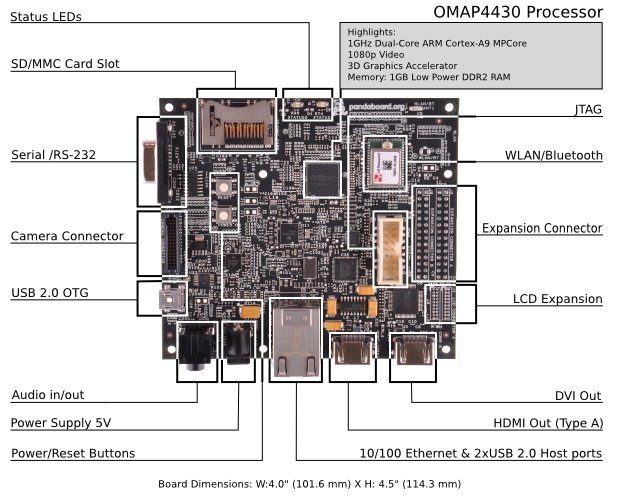
Description of the PandaBoard

The OMAP4430 SoC on the PandaBoard features a dual-core 1 GHz ARM Cortex-A9 MPCore CPU, a 304 MHz PowerVR SGX540 GPU, IVA3 multimedia hardware accelerator with a programmable DSP, and 1 GiB of DDR2 SDRAM. The PandaBoard ES uses a newer SoC, with a dual-core 1.2 GHz CPU and 384 MHz GPU. Primary persistent storage is via an SD card slot allowing SDHC cards up to 32 GB to be used. The board includes wired 10/100 Ethernet as well as wireless Ethernet and Bluetooth connectivity. Its size is slightly larger than the ETX/XTX Computer form factor at 4 in × 4.5 in (100 mm × 110 mm). The board can output video signals via DVI and HDMI interfaces. It also has 3.5 mm audio connectors. It has two USB host ports and one USB On-The-Go port, supporting USB 2.0.

=== Operating systems ===
The device runs the Linux kernel, with either traditional distributions or the Android or Mozilla Firefox OS user environment. Optimised versions of Android and Ubuntu are available from the Linaro Foundation. Linaro has selected the PandaBoard to be one of the hardware platforms they support with monthly build images.

OpenBSD supports PandaBoard. FreeBSD added PandaBoard support in August 2012.

The Genode Operating System Framework added support in release 12.05 (May 2012).

A version of RISC OS 5 is actively developed.

QNX Neutrino 6.5.0 SP1 and 6.6.0 have Board Support Packages for the PandaBoard and PandaBoard ES.

=== Graphics ===
The PandaBoard has an integrated SGX540 graphics processor and provides 1080p HDMI output. This GPU supports OpenGL ES 2.0, OpenGL ES 1.1, OpenVG 1.1 and EGL 1.3.

For Linux - X11 utilizing hardware floating point libraries is PowerVR's SGX540 GPU hardware is unusable without a GPU driver. Furthermore, PowerVR will not release documentation so that an open source driver could be produced.

Due to PowerVR making the driver unavailable, and withholding the documentation on the GPU hardware, the only alternative is the difficult and inefficient reverse engineering method to develop a GPU driver. An effort was started in July 2012, but as of June 2013 there is no visible progress.

The Linaro Linux project had a Linux X11 software floating point GPU driver available, but all current efforts with ARM Linux seem to be utilizing the hardware floating point libraries. The soft/hard floating point systems are not compatible.

=== Clock ===
The PandaBoard has a real-time clock, but it does not have a battery to save the time when power is removed. As an alternative, a software clock can set the clock time at bootup based on the time of the last modification to the file system so that times stored in files will be more reasonable. NTP can set the correct date and time if the PandaBoard has network access to an NTP server.

=== Similar products ===
- Raspberry Pi Single-board computer using an older ARM11 core with a more powerful GPU featuring 1080p hardware accelerated video decoding of H.264, significantly cheaper.
- Cotton Candy is a single-board computer on stick.
- Hawk Board Low power OMAP SBC with SATA & VGA out.
- Gumstix Overo COMs use the OMAP3503 or the OMAP3530 to provide a full product line of BeagleBoard-compatible products for hobbyist, robotic and commercial use.
- CuBox - Low-power Marvell ARM desktop/nettop computer
- BeagleBoard - Similar to PandaBoard but using OMAP3530 or OMAP3730, JTAG connector and one of the expansion connectors is the same.
  - BeagleBone - A Sitara-based development board

== Expansion boards ==
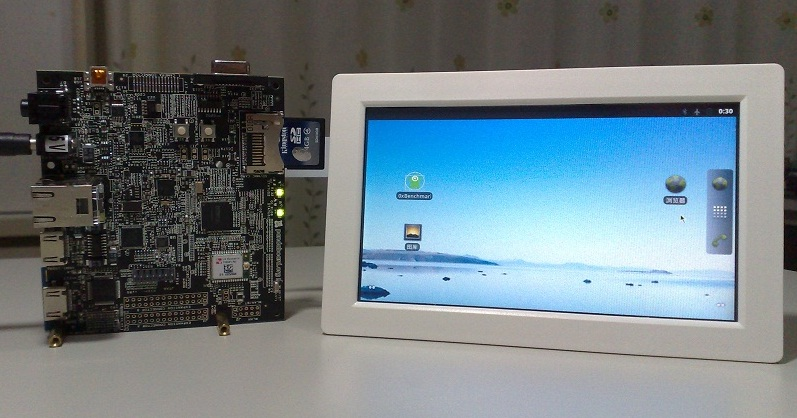
- BeadaFrame
  BeadaFrame 7" LCD kit
  - 7" 800x480 TFT LCD
  - PWM Backlight control
  - Resistive touch screen
  - RTC time keeper
  - Plastic frame

== See also ==
- OpenMAX IL (Open Media Acceleration Integration Layer) - a royalty-free cross-platform media abstraction API from the Khronos Group
- Distributed Codec Engine (libcde) is a Texas Instruments API for the video codec engine in OMAP based embedded systems
