= Archos 70 =

Tablet computer running Android

ARCHOS 70 Internet Tablet
- Developer: Archos
- Type: Tablet media player/PC
- Released: Varies by region
- Media: Video, Music, Photos, Games, Applications
- Operating system: Android 2.2.1 "Froyo"
- CPU: 1.0GHz TI OMAP3630
- Memory: 256MB RAM
- Storage: Flash memory 8 GB and microSD slot or Hard drive 250 GB
- Display: 800 × 480 px, 7.0 in (18 cm) diagonal
- Graphics: PowerVR SGX530
- Sound: speaker, microphone, headset jack
- Input: Multi-touch screen
- Camera: front-facing VGA camera (for video calls)
- Connectivity: Wi-Fi 802.11a/b/g/n, Bluetooth, 2.1EDR
- Power: 3.7V 3850mAh Lithium Polymer battery
- Dimensions: 201 mm (7.9 in) (h); 114 mm (4.5 in) (w); 10 mm (0.39 in) (d)
- Weight: 300 g (0.66 lb)
- Website: archos.com/products/ta/archos_70it

The ARCHOS 70 Internet Tablet is part of the Archos Generation 8 range, distributed between 2010 and 2011. It is a 7 inches (18 cm) tablet computer running Android.

== See also ==
- Archos 43
- Archos 101
