= Archos =

French multinational electronics company

- Type: Public
- Traded as: Euronext Paris: ALJXR
- ISIN: FR0000182479
- Industry: Consumer electronics
- Founded: October 4, 1989; 37 years ago
- Founder: Henri Crohas
- Headquarters: Archos Zone Industrielle, 12 rue Ampère 91430, Igny, France
- Number of locations: 8 office locations (2013)
- Area served: Worldwide
- Key people: Henri Crohas, Chairman of the Board; Loic Porier, CEO; Marc de Courville, Director of Software Engineering
- Products: Portable media players, tablet computers, hard disks, PDAs, Smartphones
- Revenue: €35.38 million (2019)
- Operating income: € -35.26 million (2019)
- Net income: € -36.47 million (2019)
- Website: www.archos.com

Archos (/ˈɑːrkoʊs/, stylized as ARCHOS) is a French multinational electronics company that was established in 1988 by Henri Crohas. Archos manufactures tablets, smartphones, portable media players and portable data storage devices. The name is an anagram of Crohas' last name. Also, in Greek (-αρχος), it's a suffix used in nouns indicating a person with power. The company's slogan has been updated from "Think Smaller" to "On The Go", and the current "Entertainment your way".

Archos has developed a variety of products, including digital audio players, portable video players (PVP), digital video recorders, a personal digital assistant, netbooks, more recently tablet computers using Google Android and Microsoft Windows (tablet PCs), and smartphones (which are manufactured by ZTE under the "Archos" brand name).

== History ==
By the year 2000, Archos became an important player in the portable media player market by releasing the very first disk-based digital audio player (DAP) called the Jukebox 6000. This product paved the way for high-capacity DAPs and the eventual wide adoption of MP3 players. Archos' success during this period was attributed to its strategy of technological leadership, releasing different iterations of a product line, which featured a succession of products with better specifications and technology than their predecessors.

In the latter part of the 2000s, Archos began to lose to Apple, which introduced its own portable devices such as the iPod. This development highlighted a trend in the technology industry where beating competitors to the market and equipping products with the most advanced technology available do not always translate to success. The company started phasing out its portable media players in 2008 to focus more on its Android tablet range.

In 2013, the company entered the mobile phone market by launching a series of smartphone models, with such product lines as Archos Cesium, Archos Diamond, Archos Titanium, Archos Platinum, Archos Neon, Archos Xenon, Archos Oxygen and Archos Helium.

In 2018, Archos introduced a slew of products to the market. The most notable of these involved the product unveiled in February, which was the very first Android-powered scooter called Citee Connect. Several weeks later, the company announced the Archos Hello, which is touted as an A.I.-powered smart display to challenge the likes of Amazon Echo. The Saphir 50X joined these gadgets in April 2018. This new release was an update to the Archos 50 Saphir, the tech company's rugged phone brand.

Archos announced the launch of the X67 5G smartphone in 2021. The mobile device has 6.67-inch display, a Mediatek Dimensity 800 MT6873 chipset, 8 GB of RAM, and 128 GB of internal storage.

== Products ==
=== Handheld and portable computers with x86 compatible processors ===
==== Archos 9 PC Tablet ====
The Archos 9 PC Tablet is a 9" tablet computer launched October 22, 2009 and contains Microsoft's Windows 7 operating system.

==== Archos 133 PC 13.3" netbook ====
The Archos 133 PC is a notebook computer with a 13.3" screen. Intel Atom D510 Dual Core, 1 GB 667/800 MHz, Webcam, Windows 7.

=== Handheld computers with ARM compatible processors ===
==== Archos 5 Internet tablet ====
In September 2009 Archos announced the Archos 5 Internet tablet.

Being an extension of the Archos 5, this internet tablet uses Google's Android mobile operating system.

Specifications:

- Processor based on ARM Cortex-A8, 32 bit, dual-issue, superscalar core @ 800 MHz 65 nm
- 256 MB of RAM
- 4.8" display, 800 × 480 resolution
- Video playback
- Music playback
- Storage: 8 or 32 GB flash memory + microSD slot (SDHC compatible) or 160-500 GB with 2.5" hard drive (ext3 file-system)
- Built in GPS
- Bluetooth 2.0
- FM radio

==== Archos 7 home tablet series ====
The home tablet series includes 7 inches (18 cm) tablets that utilizes Google's Android mobile operating system. All versions have video and music playback and come equipped with a microSD slot that can support up to 32 GB cards.

	V1	V2	7c
Release date	2010.05	2010.12	2011.05
Display	7", 800x480		
Android version	1.5	2.1	
ARM 9 CPU by Rockchip	RK2808 600 MHz	RK2818 800 MHz	
RAM	128 MB		
Internal storage built-in	2 or 8 GB	8 GB	
WiFi	802.11g		
Accelerometer	No	Yes	

=== Archos 8 home tablet ===
The Archos 8 home tablet is a device that resembles a digital photo frame but is actually a full featured computer system that comes with an 8" touch screen with a resolution of 800x600 pixels.

==== Generation 8 ====
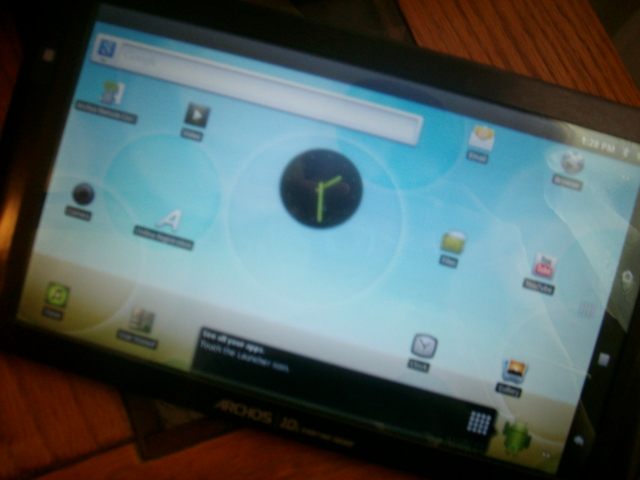
An Archos 101 Internet Tablet in landscape mode.

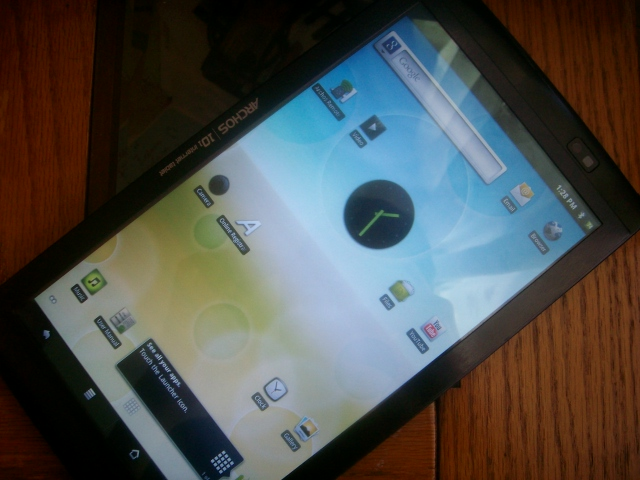
An Archos 101 Internet Tablet in portrait mode.

On August 31, 2010, Archos announced its eighth generation of tablets. The five tablets were supposed to be launched with Android 2.2 Froyo along with a hold-over release of the Archos 5 without its GPS. Froyo was not released until sometime around December, due to numerous delays with the Archos firmware development team.

	Archos 28	Archos 32	Archos 43	Archos 70	Archos 101
Storage	4 or 8 GB flash	8 GB flash	8 or 16 GB	8 GB flash or 250 GB HDD	8 or 16 GB
Display	2.8" 320x240	3.2" 400x240	4.3" 854x480	7.0" 800x480	10.1" 1024x600
Touchscreen	Resistive			Capacitive (2 points)	
CPU ARM Cortex-A8	800 MHz no DSP	800 MHz with DSP	1000 MHz (1 GHz) with DSP		
RAM memory	128 MB	256 MB			
Graphics abilities	OpenGL ES 2.0 compatible				
Video formats	MPEG-4, H.264, WMV/VC1, M-JPEG, AVI, MP4, MOV, 3GP, MPG, PS, TS, VOB, MKV, FLV, RM, RMVB, ASF, WMV				
Subtitle support	.srt, .ssa, .smi, .sub, MKV / VOB embedded subtitles				
Audio formats	MP3 CBR & VBR, WMA, WMA-Pro 5.1, WAV(PCM/ADPCM), AAC, OGG Vorbis, FLAC, AC3 5.1				
Image formats	JPEG, BMP, PNG, GIF				
I/O connections	USB 2.0				
Bluetooth 2.1 EDR	No	Yes			
Dimensions	100 x 54 x 9mm	105 x 55 x 9mm	135 x 65 x 9mm	201 x 114 x 10mm or 14mm	270 x 150 x 12mm
Weight	68g	72g	130g	300g or 400g	480g

==== Arnova series ====
Under the new brandname Arnova, in 2011 Archos released a series of low-cost Android tablets for the mass-consumer market. They are priced at 100 Euro to 200 Euro (in the U.S. $99 to $199). Older models have resistive touch screens, and uses the RK2818 Rockchip SoC. All versions have Wi-Fi (802.11 b/g). All currently come with the AppsLib application store. The official Android Market is not included out of box, but the Arnova devices may easily be rooted, and the Android Market is commonly installed by Arnova owners.

The Arnova 8.4's configuration is aimed at those who wish to use their tablet primarily as an e-book reader. The Arnova cG2 has a built-in GPS and limited video and audio format support.

	Arnova 7	Arnova 8	Arnova 8.4	Arnova 10	Arnova G2	Arnova cG2
Display	7"	8"	8.4"	10.1"	7" (800*480) or 10" (1024*600)	
Storage					4-8 GB Extendable via micro SDHC Slot	None internal; shipped with 4 GB microSDHC
SoC	RK2818 Rockchip				RK2918 Rockchip	Qualcomm MSM7227
OS	2.2	2.1			2.3	
Touchscreen	Resistive				Capacitive (2 point) multi-touch	
CPU ARM Cortex		ARM9 600 MHz		ARM9 600 MHz	ARM8 1 GHz	
RAM memory					512 MB DDR2	256-512? MB

==== Generation 9 ====
Archos announced in 2011 that it would release a $199 Honeycomb tablet. The G9 tablets are powered by the TI OMAP4 series of SoCs, using the 4430 and 4460 variants at 1 GHz, 1.2 GHz, or 1.5 GHz and are equipped with either 512 MB or 1 GB RAM. They have 8 GB or 16 GB of flash memory, and a microSDHC slot or a 250 GB hard drive. The earliest releases of these tablets utilized Android 3.0 and are upgradable to Android 4.0.3. All have official access to Google Play. Connectivity includes WiFi (802.11 b/g/n), Bluetooth 2.1 + EDR, and GPS and are upgradable to 3G using an Archos G9 3G stick.

	Archos 80 G9	Archos 101 G9
Storage	8 or 16 GB flash + microSD Slot (SDHC compatible) or 250 GB HDD	
Display	8.0" 1024×768	10.1" 1280×800
Touchscreen	Capacitive 4 points	
SoC	TI OMAP 4430 – 1.0/1.2 GHz (45 nm); TI OMAP 4460 – 1.5 GHz (45 nm)	
RAM	512 MB (467MB usable) / 1 GB	
Graphics abilities	OpenGL ES 2.0 compatible	
Video formats	MPEG-4, H.264/AVC, WMV/VC1, M-JPEG, AVI, MP4, MOV, 3GP, MPG, PS, TS, VOB, MKV, FLV, RM, RMVB, ASF, WMV	
Subtitle support	.srt, .ssa, .smi, .sub, MKV/VOB embedded subtitles	
Audio formats	MP3 CBR/VBR, WMA, WMA-Pro 5.1, WAV (PCM/ADPCM), AAC, Ogg Vorbis, FLAC, AC3 5.1	
Image formats	JPEG, BMP, PNG, GIF	
I/O connections	USB 2.0	
Bluetooth	Bluetooth 2.1 + EDR	
Dimensions	226 × 155 × 11.7 mm or 14.7 mm	276 × 167 × 12.6 mm or 15.6 mm
Weight	465 g or 595 g	649 g or 755 g

==== Generation 10 ====
Archos launched a new series of tablets, under the Name Gen 10 XS.

=== Digital camcorders, audio/video players and PDAs ===
==== Vision Line ====
Archos introduced their Vision line in 2009. The Archos 3cam Vision had similar features to the 3 Vision, adding an integrated camera for recording video and taking pictures. The Archos 43 Vision, a video media player, was released on March 3, 2010.

	Archos 24	Archos 3	Archos 43	Archos 18	Archos 15	Archos 14	Archos 1	Archos 2
Storage	8 GB				4 GB			8 GB or 16 GB
Display	2.4" color	3" color, 400x240 pixels	4.3" color	1.8" color	1.5" color	1.4" color		
Battery		14hr music, 4hr video	30hr	12hr			20hr	
Compatibility		Windows or Mac and Linux (with mass storage support)						
Recorder		Yes		Yes				
Audio formats	MP3	MP3, WMA (non protected files), WAV, OGG, FLAC				MP3		
Image formats		JPEG, BMP, GIF						
Video formats		RM, AVI, FLV, WMV, RMVB, MPEG-1, MPEG-2, MPEG-4						
Other formats		TXT, LRC						
I/O connections		USB 2.0 High Speed						
FM radio	Yes	Yes + wireless streaming			Yes			
Dimensions		95mm x 52mm x 9mm	10 mm		6 mm			
Weight		63 g	280 g		18 g			
Other		Clock, calendar, lyrics display, adjustable sound equalizer, multi-language interface					Lyric and photo display	

=== FamilyPad ===
Archos launched a 13.3" tablet in December 2012. Sold for €299, it was aggressively placed among the other large screen tablets (superior to 9.7"). Other 13.3" inch tables include Toshiba's Excite™ 13 Tablet, which has been discontinued.

In March 2013, the FamilyPad was quickly followed by the FamilyPad 2, with an improved dual core Cortex-A9 at 1.6 GHz and quadruple GPU Mali 400 (compared to the former mono Cortex-A8 at 1 GHz of the Familypad 1). Its technical specifications were:

- Display: 13.3": 1280 x 800 pixels
- Application Framework: Android 4.1, "Jelly Bean"
- Processor: Dual-core A9 @ 1.6 GHz and Quad-core GPU Mali 400 MP4
- Capacity: 8GB + micro SD (compatible with cards up to 64GB)
- RAM: 1GB
- Battery life: Video playback time: 10h / Standby: 6 days
- Dimensions / weight: 337 mm x 230 mm x 11.6 mm (13.3" x 9.0" x 0.45") / 1.3 kg (2.86 pounds)

=== Elements Series ===
In 2013 Archos introduced their Elements series which include Cobalt, Xenon, Carbon, Titanium, and recently the Platinum tablet line-ups. Archos has mostly been pushing to publicize the Titanium & Platinum series which they announced at CES 2013. In announcing their Titanium & Platinum series, Archos stated that each of the tablet models were made to compete against another major tablet range in the market, but at a lower price:

- 70 Titanium – Amazon
- 80 Titanium & Platinum – iPad mini
- 97 Titanium & Platinum – iPad 3 and iPad (4th generation)

=== Past products ===
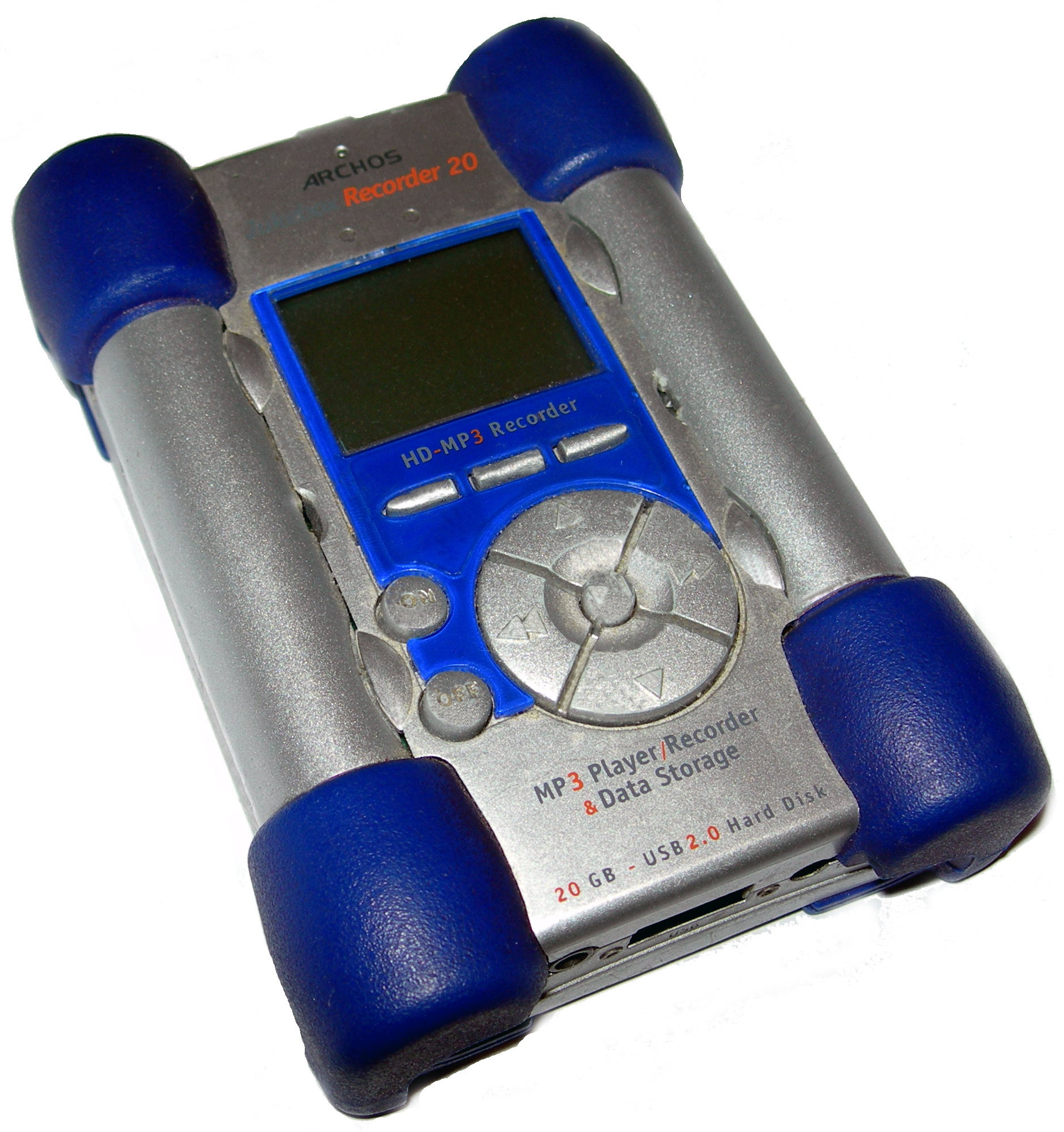
An early ARCHOS MP3 Player and recorder.

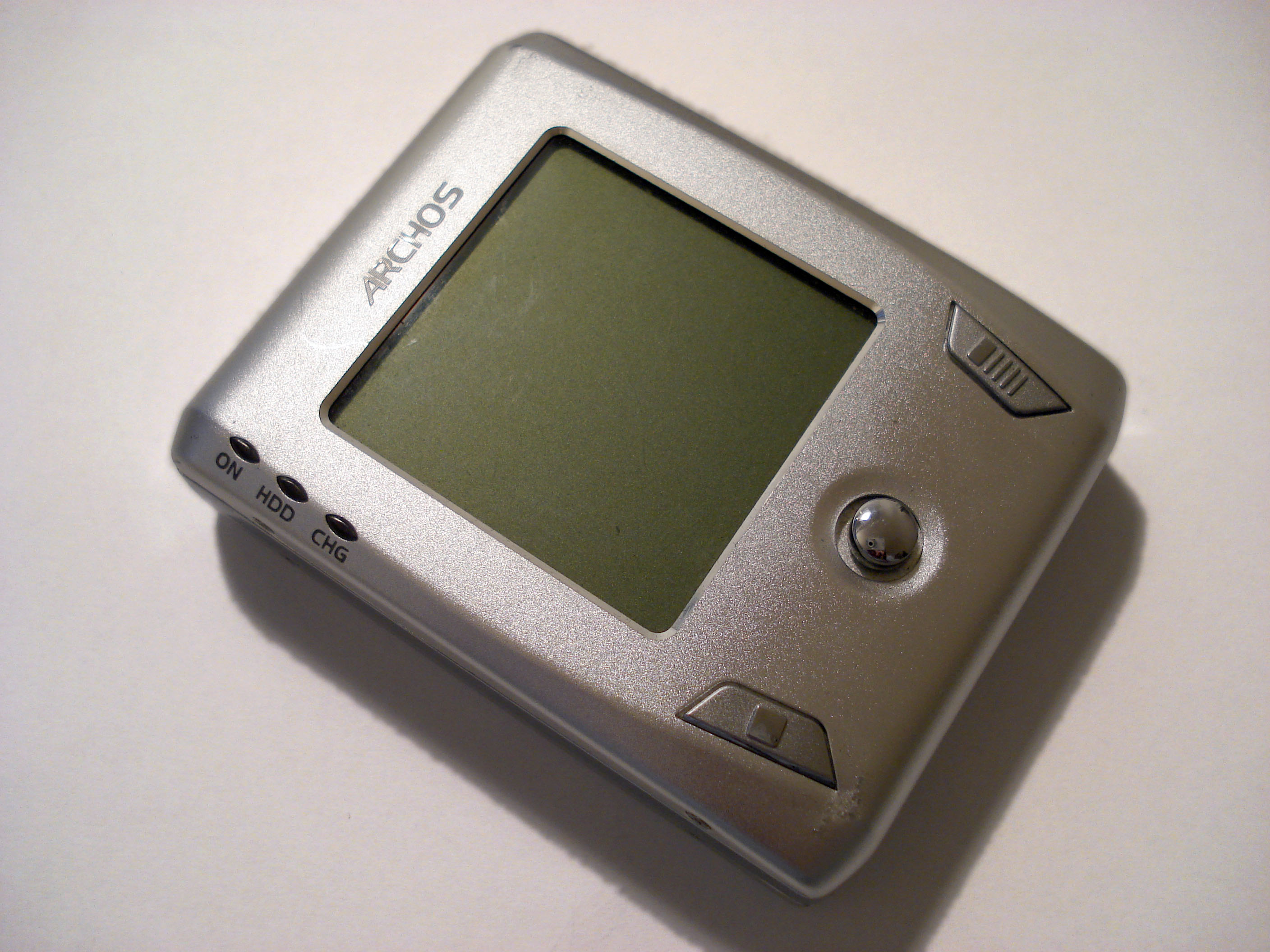
Archos XS202

Former Archos products since discontinued include handheld and portable computers, digital camcorders, audiovisual playback equipment, portable storage devices, and peripherals for the Amiga line.

== Partnerships ==
=== Content portals ===
Released along with the Generation 5 and Archos TV+ devices in 2007, the Archos Content Portal (ACP) provides video on demand purchase or rental directly to the internet enabled devices. However, there is no PC based software for the service such as iTunes. A major difference from similar services is that given "portals" are serviced by different distributors, such as CinemaNow in North America. Archos has numerous ACP partners worldwide but they vary by region.

=== MoovyPlay ===
In the summer of 2007 French-based Cinebank announced MoovyPlay. The device runs on a kiosk to harddrive rental service with Archos building the 40GB player. The Drive attaches to a Dock similar to those seen in Archos players and connects to a Video Display. The device was launched in France on December 10, 2007, with initial success.

=== PocketDish ===
DISH Network Corporation, which owns 19% of Archos since 2005, sold Archos PVPs under the PocketDish brand. There were three versions, the AV700E (AV700), AV500 (AV500), and the AV402E (Gmini 402). While the original products are no longer available, on December 18, 2007, Dish Network released info on a new similar deal with the current generation 605 and 705 Wi-Fi, allowing high speed transfers to the devices from their current HD receivers. Unlike with the original PocketDish, the products will not be sold a Dish rebranding, instead the software plug-in was made available for free for the two products. They are expected to be sold alongside Dish products in January. In 2008 Dish Network's PocketDish page was updated to show the new service and products.

=== American Airlines ===
In May 2007, American Airlines revealed plans of offering modified Archos 604 and 704s to first-class passengers for entertainment during their flight.

=== Opera ===
Opera Software has provided the web browser for Archos devices since the PMA400. They are a version of Opera for devices similar to that seen on the Wii video game console and the Nokia N800 Internet appliance. On Generation 5 devices Adobe Flash support was added. An update to full Flash 9 support was announced in April 2008 from the current Flash 7.

=== SFR ===
In late 2007, SFR, a French mobile phone company, announced to be building a new device with Archos that utilizes 3G communication. It was revealed to be the Archos 5g. The Archos 5g is currently available for a discounted price through SFR for a service contract.

=== Blockbuster ===
A similar deal to the one with Cinebank was announced with Blockbuster Inc. in 2008. The specifics were revealed and Blockbuster hinted that the service will not be Archos exclusive.

== See also ==
- Portable media player
- Tablet computer
