= Motorola Milestone XT720 =

Android-based smartphone

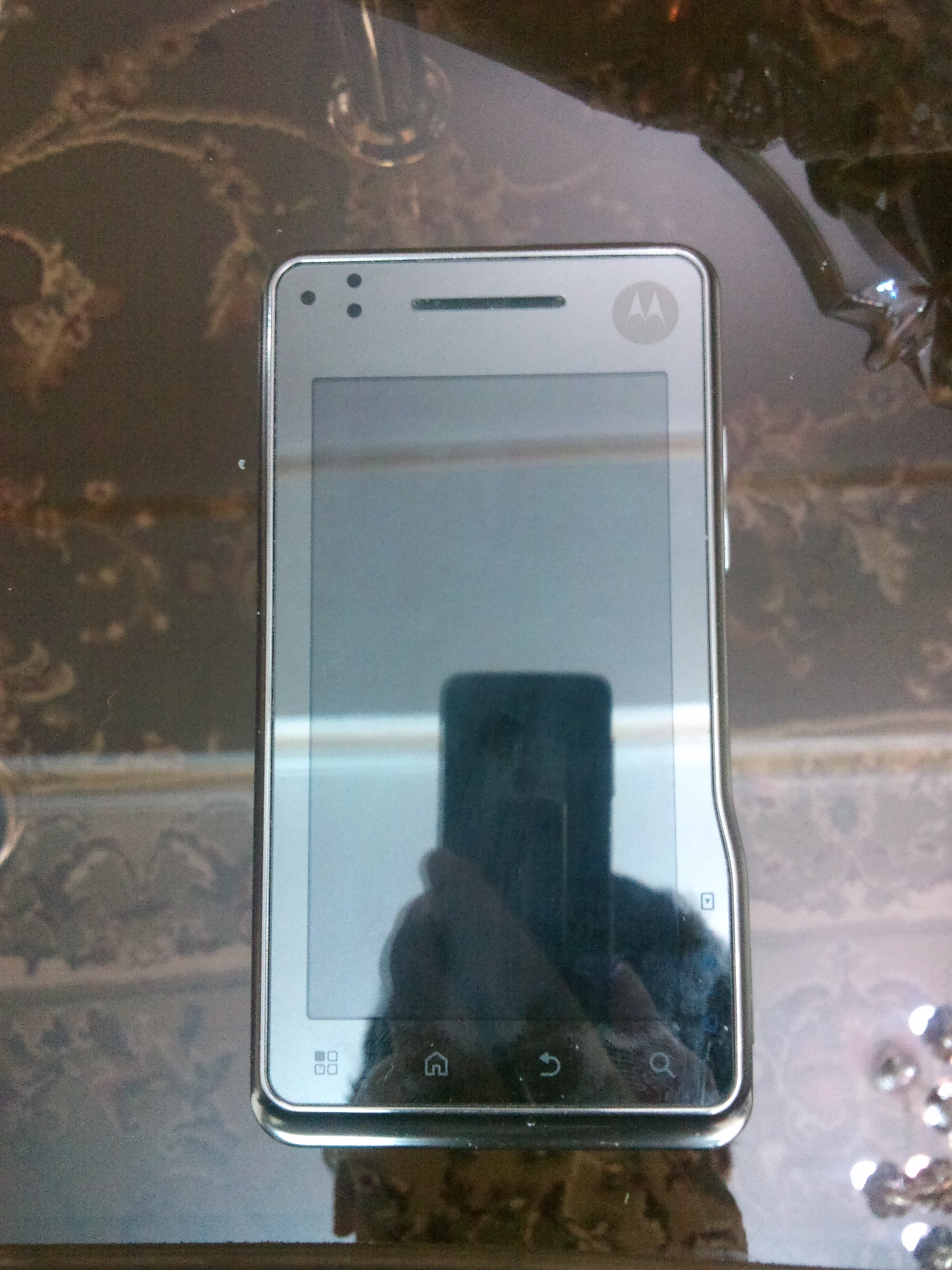
- Manufacturer: Motorola Mobility
- Product family: Milestone
- Type: Smartphone
- Released: July 2010; 16 years ago
- Introductory price: €558.99
- Operating system: Android 2.1 (customs up to 4.0.4)
- CPU: TI OMAP 3440 Arm Cortex A8 720 MHz
- Memory: 256 MB RAM
- Storage: Onboard flash memory: 512 MB; Removable microSDHC: 8 GB (included), expandable up to 32 GB
- Display: 854×480 px (0.41 MP) TFT LCD, 3.7 in (94 mm), FWVGA, 265 ppi, 16 million colors (24 bit), Gorilla Glass
- Graphics: PowerVR SGX 530
- Sound: Mono
- Input: Multi-touch capacitive touchscreen display; Ambient light sensors; Proximity sensor; Microphone; Magnetometer (compass); aGPS; 3-axis accelerometer
- Camera: Back: 8.0 MP, with 720p (1280×720 px) video at 24 fps or higher), geotagging, xenon flash, autofocus. Touch to focus with easy panorama, face detection, multi-shot (6 shots in a row), face filter, red eye reduction, camera shake prevention, scene controls and effects
- Connectivity: 3.5 mm jack TRRS; Bluetooth 2.1 + EDR, Class 1; micro-HDMI 1.4 (type D), 720p; micro-USB 2.0; FM stereo receiver; Wi-Fi 802.11b/g; Quad band: WCDMA 1700/2100; GSM 850/900/1800/1900; HSDPA 10.2 Mbps (category 9/10) / 7.2 Mbps (category 7/8); EDGE Class 12; GPRS Class 12; HSUPA 5.76 Mbps
- Power: 1390 mAh (BP6X); Internal rechargeable removable lithium-ion polymer battery, talk time: 270 minutes (3G), 540 minutes (2G), standby time: 320 hours
- Dimensions: 115.95 mm (4.565 in) H 60.9 mm (2.40 in) W 10.9 mm (0.43 in) D
- Weight: 160 g (5.6 oz)
- Website: Official website

The Motorola Milestone XT720 (known simply as "Motorola XT720") is an Android-based smartphone manufactured by Motorola Mobility, originally released in July 2010. Announced in June of that year, it was the first Motorola Android phone with xenon flash.

== Features ==
Features of the phone include a TI OMAP 3440 ARM Cortex A8 720 MHz CPU, 256 MB RAM, Wi-Fi 802.11b/g networking, Bluetooth 2.1 + EDR, micro-HDMI 1.4 (type D) port, with 720p video output, micro-USB 2.0.

It also features an 8 megapixel digital camera with xenon flash, a standard 3.5 mm headphone jack, interchangeable battery, 3.7 inch 854×480 px multi-touch capacitive touchscreen display. It also includes microSDHC support with bundled 8 GB card. It features the Gorilla Glass resistant coating.

It includes an ambient light sensor, a proximity sensor, a microphone, a magnetometer (Compass), a 3-axis accelerometer, and an aGPS.

The phone's "slide-to-unlock" feature was part of Apple Inc.'s German copyright infringement lawsuits against Motorola Mobility, which Apple won in two separate judgments in 2012.

=== Media ===
If supports the following media formats:

- Audio: AMR-NB/WB, MP3, PCM, WAV, AAC, WMA eAAC, eAAC+, OGG
- Video: MPEG-4, H263, H264, WMV

== Carriers ==
The following carriers sold the Motorola Milestone XT720:

- Cincinnati Bell
- Vidéotron
- Wind Mobile
- Ntelos
- Cellular One

== Software upgrades ==
Motorola is unwilling to upgrade the Android 2.1 operating system preloaded on the Milestone XT720. Nevertheless, wireless operator Cincinnati Bell as well as third-party developers have provided means to install the Android 2.2 operating system on the XT720. Such upgrades are not certified by Motorola and involve the rooting of the smartphone.

=== Cincinnati Bell ===
Cincinnati Bell certified a 2.2 software upgrade that can be installed by anyone who owns this phone or by the service provider's store representatives for their customers. It has slight differences compared to an earlier update provided by Hellmonger.

=== Third-party upgrades ===
Hellmonger, a xda-developers user, released an Android 2.2 upgrade six months prior to Cincinnati Bell's upgrade. RouthMape

== Gallery ==
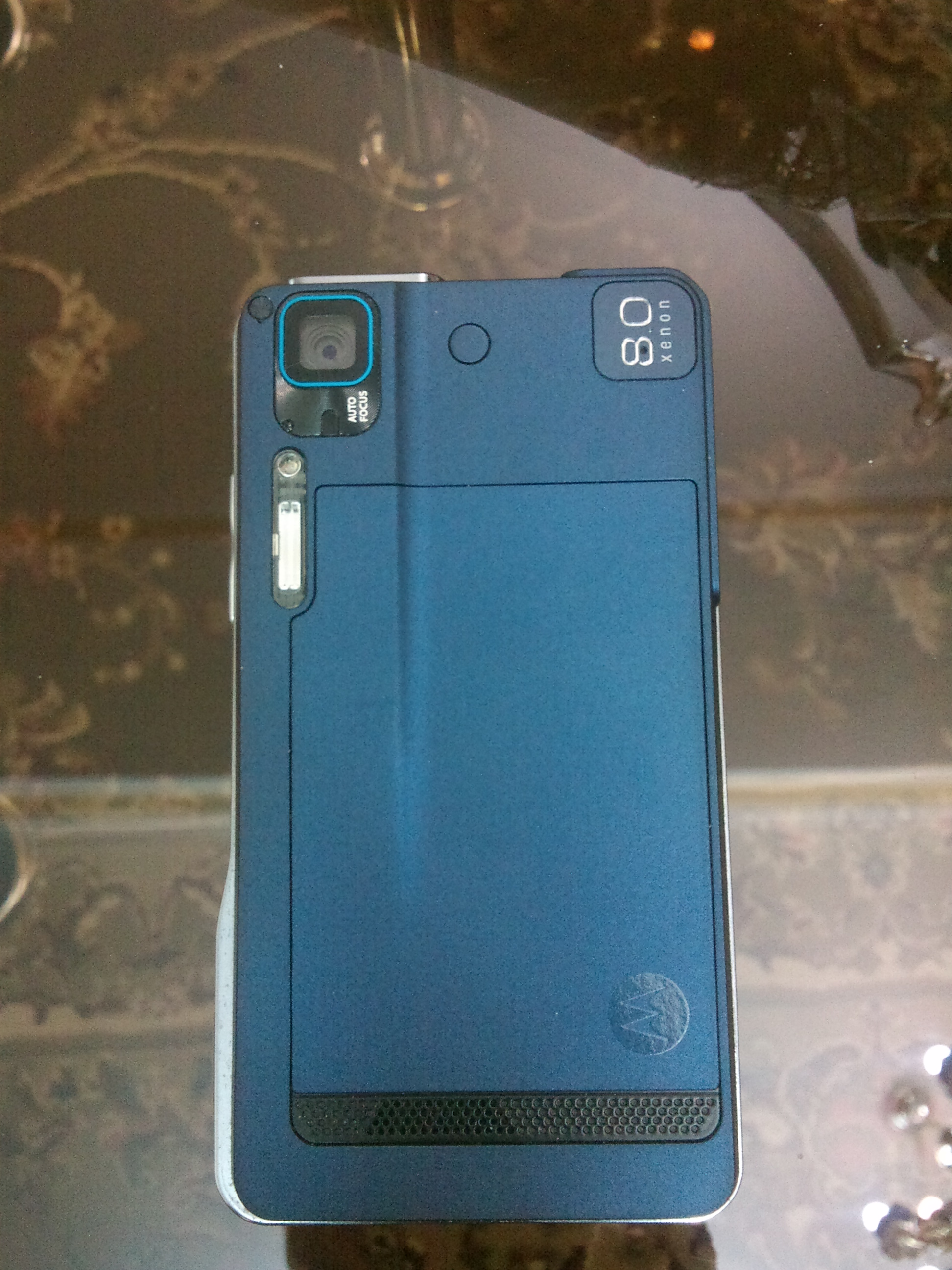
Rear side

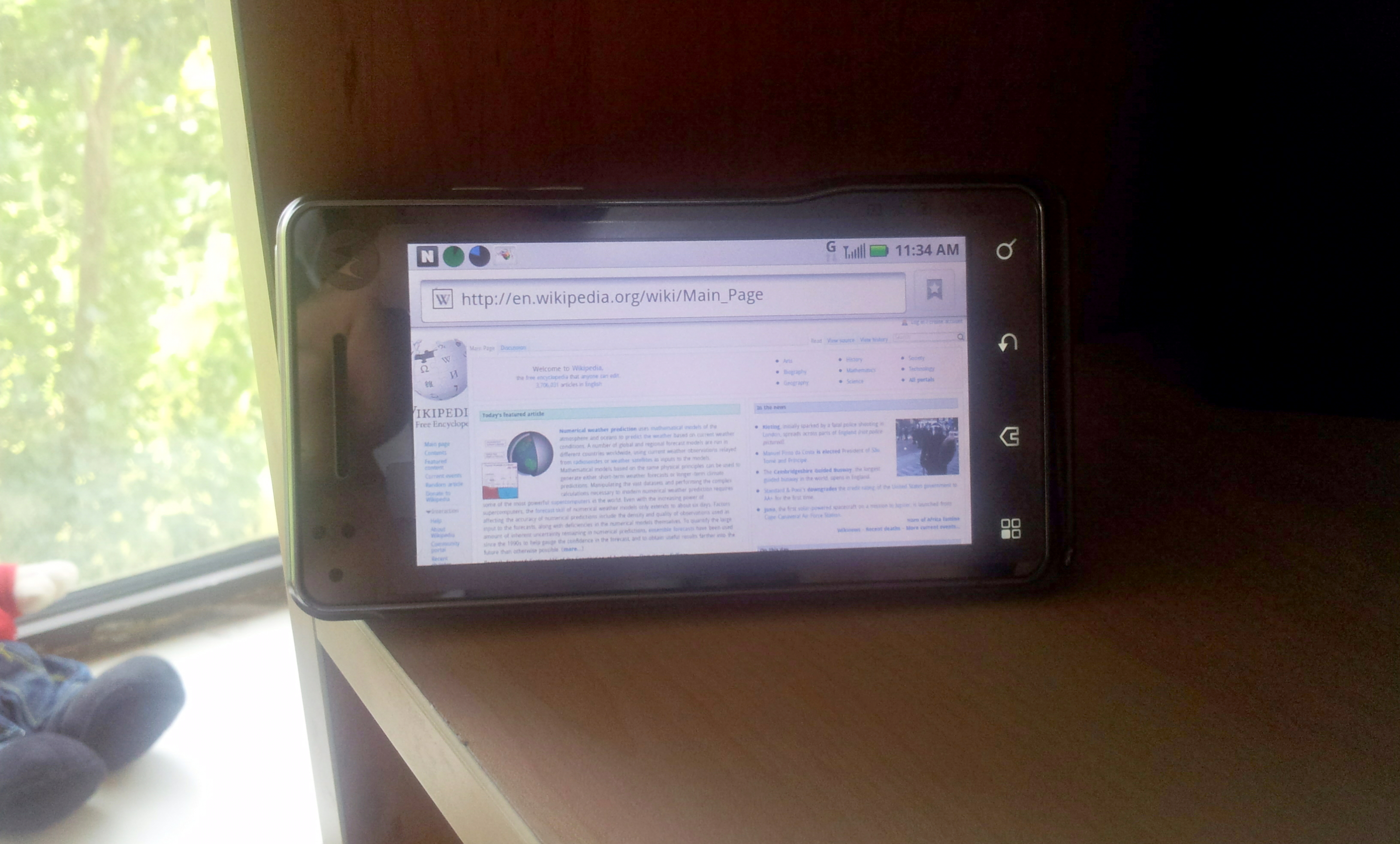
Default browser displaying Wikipedia

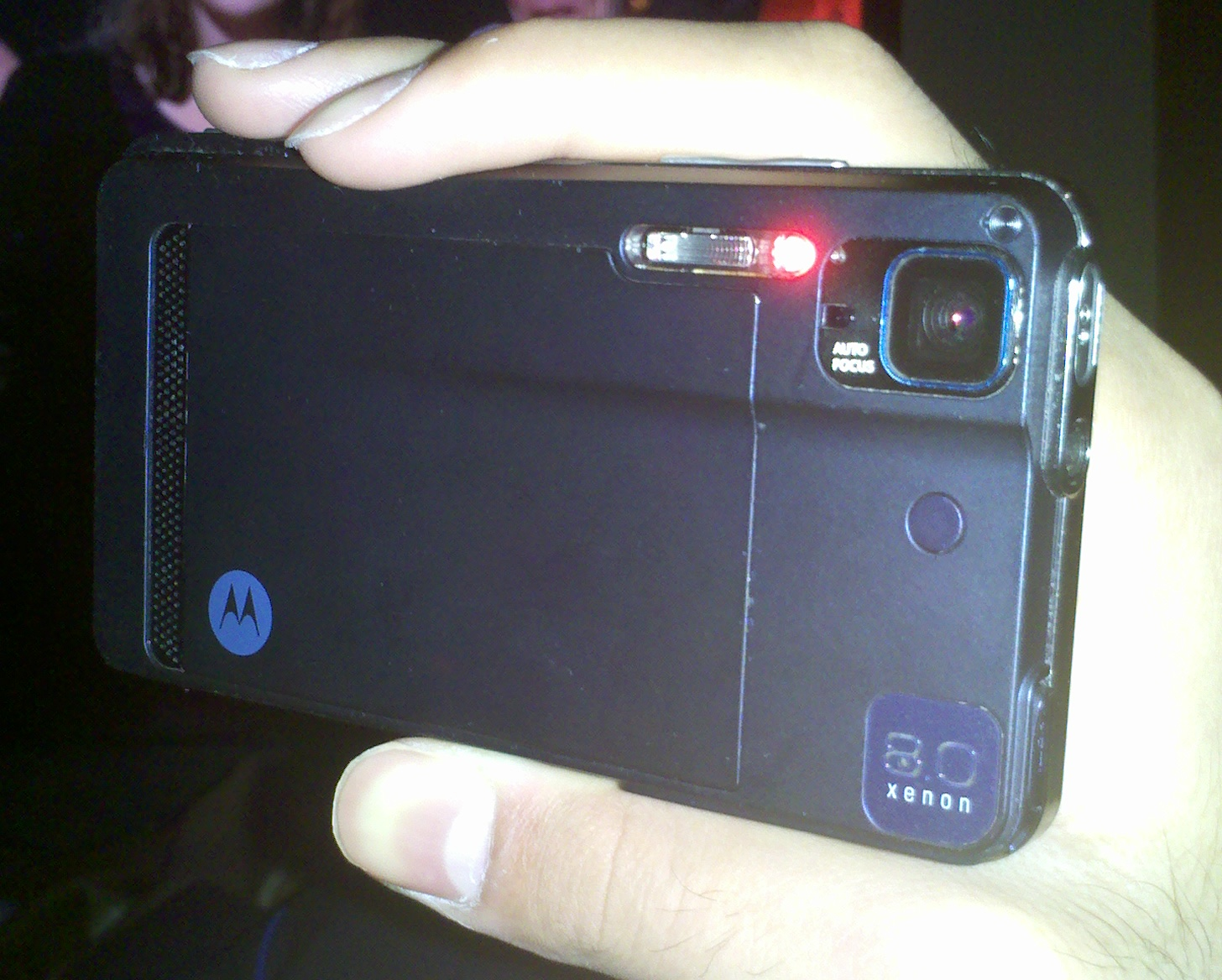
While capturing photo
