= Huawei Ascend D1 =

Huawei smartphone

- Manufacturer: Huawei
- Type: Smartphone
- First released: February 2012
- Successor: Huawei Ascend D2
- Compatible networks: GSM 900/1800/1900 MHz, 3G
- Form factor: Slate
- Dimensions: 129 mm (5.1 in) H 64 mm (2.5 in) W 8.9 mm (0.35 in) D
- Weight: 130 g (4.6 oz)
- Operating system: Android 4.0 Ice Cream Sandwich (Upgradable to 4.1.1 Jelly Bean with Huawei Emotion UI)
- System-on-chip: Texas Instruments OMAP 4460
- CPU: 1.5 GHz dual-core
- GPU: PowerVR SGX540
- Memory: 1 GB
- Storage: 8 GB
- Removable storage: microSD, up to 32 GB
- Battery: 1800 mAh lithium-polymer
- Rear camera: 8 MP with autofocus, 3264 × 2448 pixels, dual-LED flash, BSI, Full HD video recording, aperture f/2.4
- Front camera: 1.3 MP
- Display: 4.5-inch IPS+ capacitive touchscreen, 1280 × 720 pixels, 326 ppi, Gorilla Glass

The Huawei Ascend D1 (U9500) is an Android smartphone developed by the Chinese company Huawei, running the Android operating system. It was unveiled at the Mobile World Congress in February 2012. The smartphone is equipped with a dual-core Texas Instruments OMAP 4460 processor, an HD display, and an 8-megapixel camera.

== Technical specifications ==
=== Processor and performance ===
The Huawei Ascend D1 features a dual-core ARM Cortex-A9 Texas OMAP 4460 processor clocked at 1500 MHz. A PowerVR SGX540 graphics accelerator is used for graphics processing. Audio on the device is handled by an Audience earSmart™ ES305 chip.

=== Memory ===
The internal storage capacity is 8 GB, and there is also a MicroSD memory card slot supporting up to 32 gigabytes. The RAM capacity is 1 gigabyte.

=== Display ===
The device is equipped with a high-quality IPS+ matrix with a diagonal of 4.5 inches and a resolution of 1280x720 pixels, protected by Gorilla Glass. The display features natural color reproduction and good viewing angles, though the maximum brightness is 247 cd/m².

=== Camera ===
The Huawei Ascend D1 uses an 8-megapixel camera with autofocus and a dual-LED flash, capable of recording video at 1080p (Full HD). It also features a built-in 1.3-megapixel front-facing camera.

=== Software ===
The device comes pre-installed with Android 4.0.3 Ice Cream Sandwich. An update to Android 4.1.1 Jelly Bean with the proprietary Huawei Emotion UI shell is available exclusively for China.

== docomo with series Ascend HW-01E (Japan) ==
The docomo with series Ascend HW-01E is a dual-mode terminal for NTT Docomo's 3.9th generation mobile communication system (Xi) and 3rd generation mobile communication system (FOMA), developed by Huawei of China. It is one of the docomo with series devices.

It is Huawei's first Android-equipped smartphone for NTT Docomo, serving as a localized Japanese market model of the global model Ascend D1. Announced on August 28, 2012, by NTT Docomo, it was released on November 21, 2012.

This includes NOTTV.
