= Olio Model One =

Discontinued smartwatch sold from 2015 to 2016 by the now defunct Olio Devices, Inc.

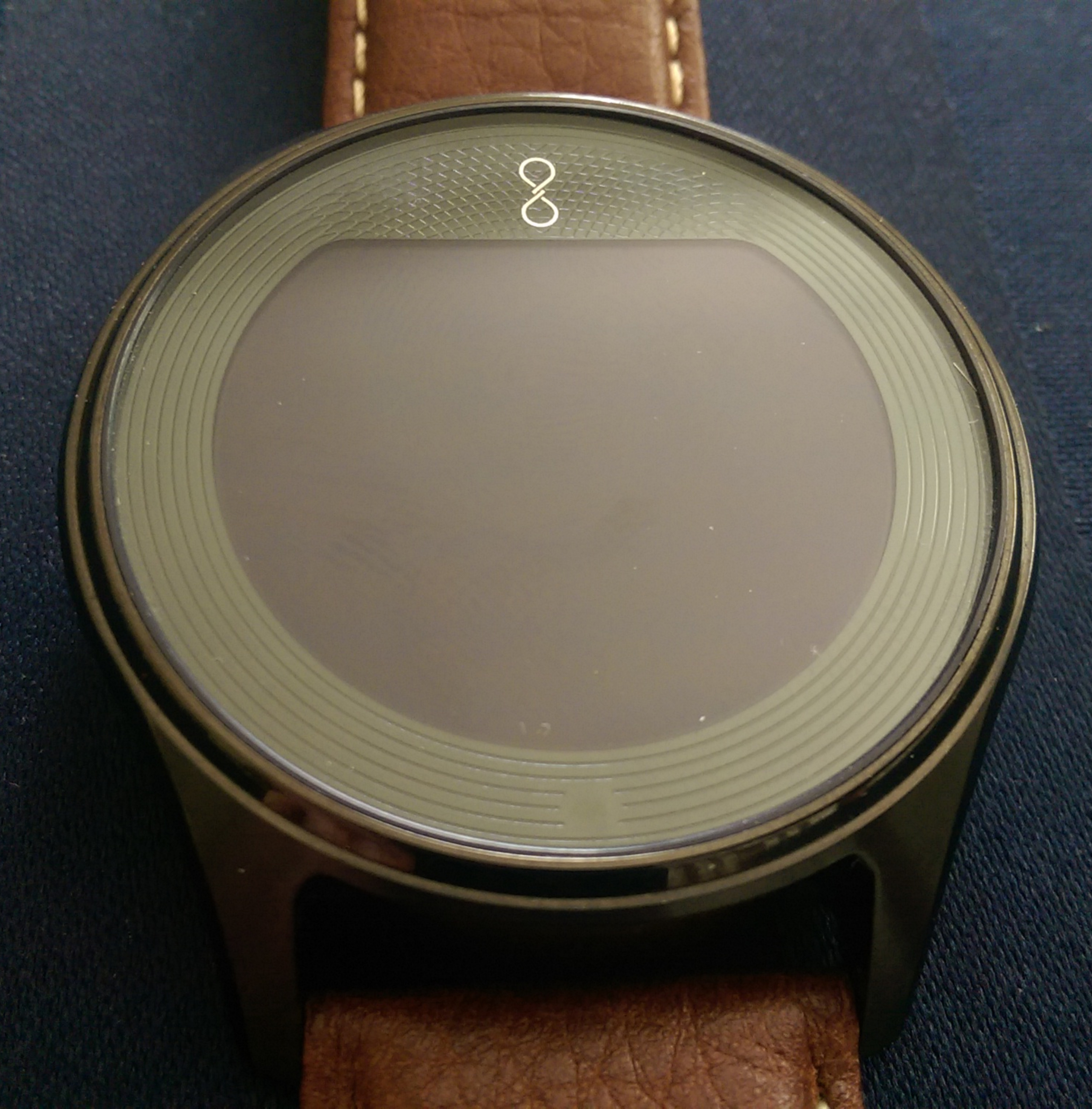
- Front side of a black Olio Model One smartwatch with a brown leather strap
- Manufacturer: Flex Ltd. (on contract)
- Type: Smartwatch
- Released: March 26, 2015
- Discontinued: November 23, 2016
- Units sold: 5000
- System on a chip: Texas Instruments OMAP3430
- CPU: Single-core ARM Cortex-A8
- Memory: 512 MB LPDDR RAM
- Storage: 1 GB NAND flash memory
- Sound: Microphone
- Input: Touchscreen, microphone, ambient light sensor
- Connectivity: Bluetooth 4.0 Low Energy
- Website: Olio Devices at the Wayback Machine (archived 3 June 2017)

The Olio Model One is a discontinued smartwatch sold from 2015 to 2016 by the now defunct Olio Devices, Inc.

== History ==
Olio Devices, Inc. was founded in 2013 by Steven K. Jacobs, Dr. Ashley J. "AJ" Cooper, and Evan Wilson. Two years later in 2015 they sold the first of their flagship watches. Olio Devices was acquired by Flex Ltd. in 2017. Olio Devices never sold any more watches after being acquired by Flex; later in 2017, Olio Devices' servers ceased to be online.

== Hardware ==
The Olio features a single-core 600 MHz Texas Instruments OMAP3430 CPU, 512 megabytes of LPDDR RAM, 1 gigabyte of NAND flash memory, a Broadcom BCM20702 Low Energy-capable Bluetooth 4.0 transceiver, a Texas Instruments DRV2605 Haptic Driver, an ambient light sensor, a microphone, a rechargeable lithium polymer battery, a wireless charging coil, and a touchscreen. The Bluetooth MAC address of every Olio watch starts with B0:C5:CA:D0.

== Software ==
The Olio watch comes preinstalled with the Android operating system with a custom user interface and startup logo. The system uses the Das U-Boot bootloader. At first boot, the watch will instruct the user to create a Bluetooth pairing between the watch and a smartphone. After doing so, the watch will display the text "Open Smartphone App". This is referring to the Olio Assist app, a companion smartphone app required to configure the Olio. Although previously available for iOS on the App Store and for Android on Google Play, the Olio Assist app is no longer available on either. The Olio Assist app can then be used to configure various features of the Olio watch. The app will automatically set the time on the watch from the phone's clock.

The Olio Smartwatch and the Olio Assist app communicate over a custom RFCOMM protocol. The app hosts the protocol on an available RFCOMM port and advertises that port over service discovery protocol with the UUID 11e63bf3-6baa-47d9-b31d-6045138c9add. The watch sends SDP queries to the phone (once every few seconds on the setup screen and once every time it turns its screen on after having been configured) until it sees that UUID, then connects to the RFCOMM port associated with it. At this point, the watch and app communicate with a binary format based on MessagePack. This protocol can be used to update the watch's underlying Android system: zip archives sent over this protocol will be extracted to the directory /data/media/0/olio/firmware_updates_apply/ in the internal filesystem; then, the watch executes the file /data/media/0/olio/firmware_updates_apply/update.sh (/update.sh in the archive) as root.

The Olio watch includes several pieces of software licensed under the GNU General Public License, such as the Linux kernel and U-Boot, but Olio Devices never released the source code to any of this software, thus violating the General Public License.

== Sales ==
Olio Devices sold the Olio in "batches" of 1,000 each. Five batches were completely sold out, for a total of 5,000 watches sold. The Olio was sold in four "collections" (colors): a black collection, a steel (silver) collection, a gold collection, and a rose gold collection.

== Production ==
The Olio watch was manufactured on contract by Flex Ltd., the company that would later acquire Olio Devices. Some of the watch's components were manufactured in China; this can be seen on the charger sold to consumers, which is engraved with "Made In China". Furthermore, prototype Olios had "ASSEMBLED IN CHINA" printed on the back casing. The Olio's motherboard, meanwhile, appears to have been manufactured in the United States, as it has "MADE IN USA" printed on it.

== Planned future generations ==
Olio Devices had planned to sell an Olio Model Two by 2016, but ultimately did not do so. According to Jacobs, the Model Two would have focused on variation, rather than being an enhancement to or exploiting planned obsolescence of the Model One. Furthermore, the Model One was designed to be modular, so that individual components could be upgraded without replacing the whole device. Olio Devices never utilized this, either.
