= Archos 43 =

Discontinued tablet computer

ARCHOS 43 Internet Tablet
- Developer: Archos
- Type: Tablet media player/PDA
- Released: Varies by region
- Operating system: Android 2.2 "Froyo"
- CPU: ARM Cortex A8 1 GHz Application Processor
- Storage: Flash memory 16 GB and microSD slot
- Display: 480 × 854 px, 4.3 in (11 cm) diagonal
- Graphics: 3D OpenGL ES 2.0
- Sound: speaker, microphone, headset jack
- Input: Touch screen
- Camera: HD Camcorder (2 MP; 720p)
- Connectivity: Wi-Fi 802.11a/b/g/n, Bluetooth, 2.1EDR
- Dimensions: 135 mm (5.3 in) (h); 65 mm (2.6 in) (w); 9 mm (0.35 in) (d)
- Weight: 130 g (0.29 lb)
- Website: archos.com/products/ta/archos_43it

ARCHOS 43 Internet Tablet is a discontinued 4.3-inch tablet computer designed and developed by Archos in the ARCHOS Generation 8 Internet Tablets line. The Archos 43 runs Android 2.2 Froyo of the Android operating system. It was released globally in early November 2010. It was met with mixed reviews, with its biggest overall complaint being its resistive touchscreen.

== Pre-installed applications ==
On the ARCHOS 43 Internet Tablet several applications are installed by default. Users are able to add applications through Appslib, an application marketplace.

- Webbrowser
- Email
- Contacts
- Appslib
- Twitter
- Wikipedia
- Weather Channel
- Ebuddy
- Deezer
- Mewbox For users from the United Kingdom
- Napster For users from the United States
- Racing Thunderlight
- World Newspaper

== See also ==
- Archos 70
- Archos 101
