= Motoactv =

Smartwatch sold by Motorola Mobility

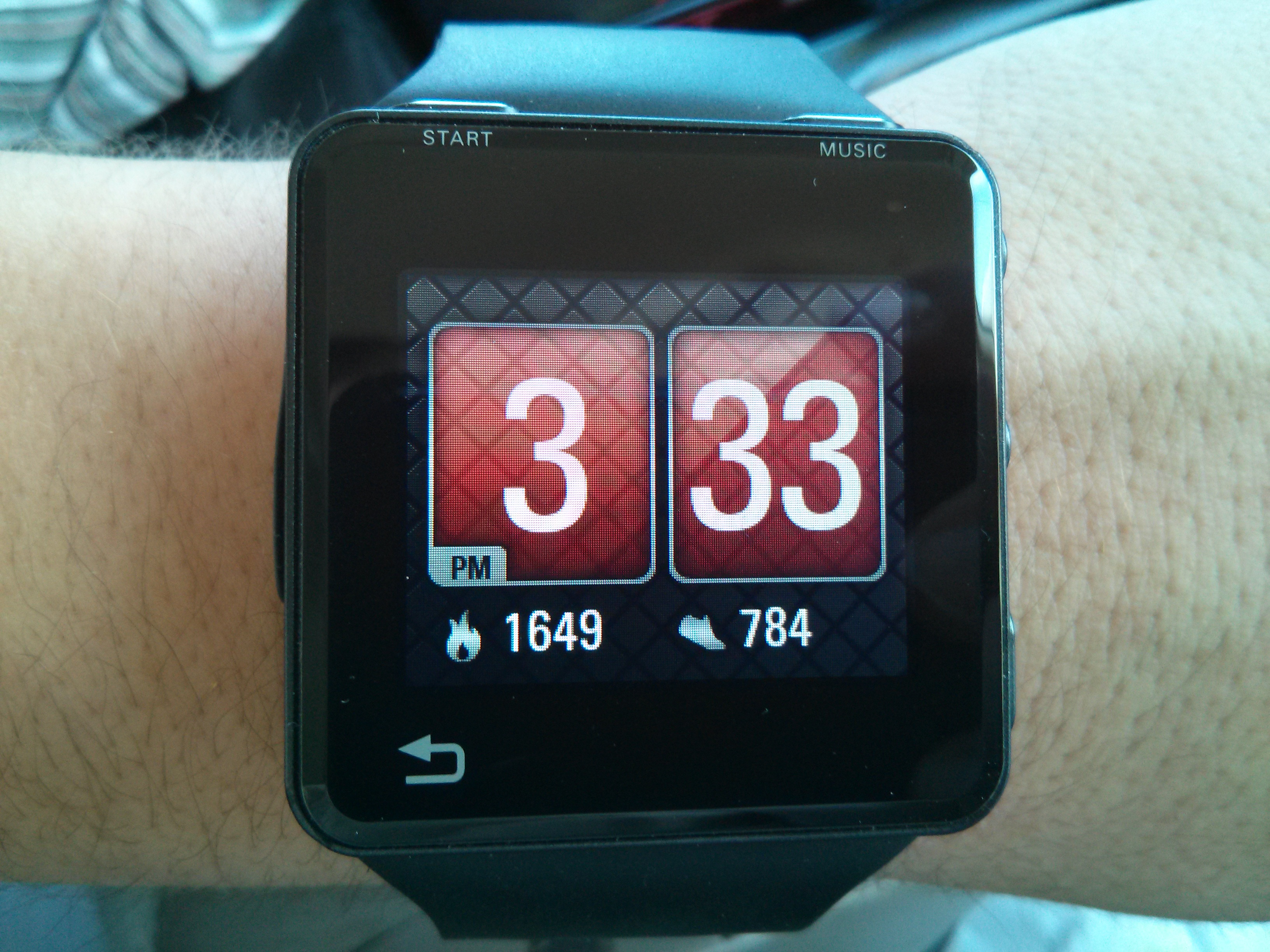
- Also known as: MOTOACTV
- Manufacturer: Motorola Mobility
- First released: November 6, 2011; 14 years ago
- Discontinued: 2013
- Operating system: Android 2.3.4
- CPU: 600 MHz OMAP3 (3630) ARMv7 CPU supporting ARM extensions thumb, vfp, vfpv3, edsp & neon.
- GPU: PowerVR GPU
- Memory: 256MB of RAM
- Storage: 8GB or 16GB of NAND Flash Memory
- Display: 1.6 in (41 mm) 220x176 capacitive multitouch LCD
- Other: ANT+ for connectivity to fitness sensors (heart rate, etc.)

Motoactv (styled MOTOACTV) is a smartwatch developed by Motorola Mobility, announced on October 18, 2011, and released to the US market on November 6, 2011. It contains a number of hardware features and software applications tailored to fitness training. The watch contains apps for monitoring athletic activity using a built-in accelerometer to measure strides and GPS to measure distance.

It can also be synced with a Speed/Cadence Bike Sensor or foot pod via ANT+ technology. The watch can communicate with external devices over Bluetooth 4.0 such as pulse sensor and Bluetooth stereo headphones for music. In addition, there is a DJ mode that will custom tailor the music dynamically to the workout.

When connected to a phone, the watch will display caller ID, text messages and calendar alerts. Plugins are available for Facebook, Twitter and Weather.

The device reports that it is running Android 2.3.4 which according to Google is the same API as Android 2.3 with some minor patches and bug fixes.

== Android software ==
Many apps install and run with the small 220x176 display, though not often very usably. CMW reports Angry Birds runs well. Google Earth performs well but with some UI issues. Google Maps not only runs well and utilizes the built-in GPS, it is very usable on the tiny screen. With the Street View addon installed, Motoactv. GPU impressively handles pseudo 3D Street View transitions at a fluid 60fps.

== Usability tweaks ==
One particular limitation with the Motoactv is the lack of either an on-screen or hardware "Menu" key, which is necessary to access most of the functionality of most Android apps. This can be remedied by remapping one of app-specific buttons at the top. For instance, the 'Music' key can be remapped to Menu simply by mapping key 387 to menu in file /system/usr/keylayout/sholes-keypad.kl. In order to change files in /system, an "adb remount" must be issued.
