= Hawkboard =

Single board computer

The Hawkboard is a low-power, low-cost Single-board computer based on the Texas Instruments OMAP-L138. Along with the usage of the OMAP ARM9 processor, it also has a floating point DSP. It is a community supported development platform.

As of date, Hawkboard project is closed because of common hardware issue.
