= Archos 101 Internet Tablet =

Android-based tablet computer

ARCHOS 101 Internet Tablet
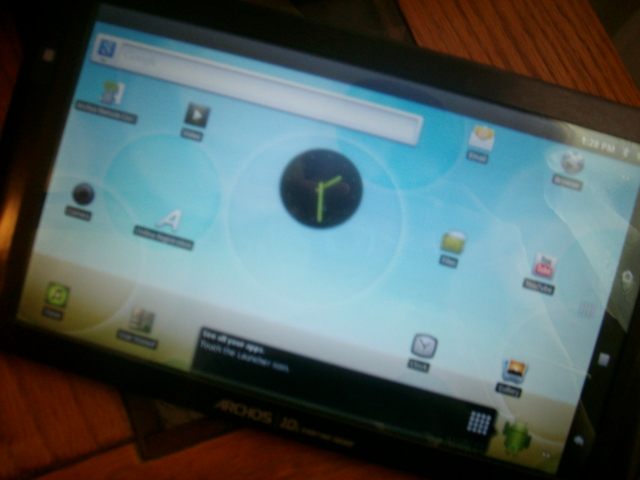
- Developer: Archos
- Manufacturer: Archos
- Type: Internet tablet
- Released: Varies by region
- CPU: TI OMAP 3630
- Storage: 8 GB or 16 GB, as well as microSD and microSDHC slot available

The ARCHOS 101 Internet Tablet is part of the Archos Generation 8 tablet range, distributed between 2010 and 2011. After a hardware upgrade, it was also part of Generation 9 range sold between 2011 and 2012. It is a 10.1-inch (256.5 mm) Internet tablet with dual-boot capability running Android out of the box.

== Features ==
=== Display ===
The Archos 101 IT is a 10.1-inch capacitive, multitouch screen tablet. It includes a WSVGA 1024×600 LCD screen with a pixel density of 118 ppi. The device also includes a light sensor and TFT technology.

=== Hardware & Battery ===
The devices uses a Li-Polymer irreplaceable battery. The battery's life for music playback is 36 hours while 7 hours for video playback.

The tablet includes an ARM Cortex-A8 single core processor, and 256 MB of RAM with a Texas Instruments OMAP 3660 chipset. It is sold with 8 GB and 16 GB version with expandable memory (microSD, microSDHC) of up to 32 GB.

=== Connectivity ===
The device includes Bluetooth support for 2.1, EDR Advanced Audio Distribution (A2DP), Audio/Video Control Transport Protocol (AVCTP), Audio/Video Distribution Transport Protocol (AVDTP), Audio/Visual Remote Control Profile (AVRCP), Generic Access (GAP), Generic Audio/Video Distribution (GAVDP), Object Push (OPP), Phone Book Access (PBAP), Service Discovery Protocol (SDP). It also includes 802.11 b/g/n Wi-Fi connectivity.

The Archos tablet also includes a USB 2.0 for mass storage device and USB charging, miniHDMI (Type C), 3.5 mm headphone jack, and computer/OTA sync.

=== Other Features ===
- Accelerometer
- .3 MP VGA camera for video calling.
- Sound recording.
- Built-In Loudspeakers
- Supports MP3, AAC, AAC+, FLAC, WMA, WAV, OGG for audio playback.
- Supports MPEG4, H.264, Motion JPG, WMV for video playback.
- Browsing supports HTML, HTML5, XHTML, WAP 2.0, Adobe Flash.
- Unlimited entries, caller groups, multiple numbers per contact, search by both first and last name, picture ID, ring ID.
- Includes Android Calendar, Alarm, Calculator.
- Supports E-mail, Instant Messaging, and Games.
