= Gumstix =

US company that makes single board computers

Gumstix, Inc.
- Type: Private
- Industry: Computer hardware
- Founded: 2003; 23 years ago
- Defunct: December 31, 2025; 5 months ago
- Fate: Dissolution
- Headquarters: Redwood City, California
- Key people: Gordon Kruberg, CEO
- Products: Complete computer systems, Gumstix Overo and verdex pro computer-on-modules, and a series of I/O expansion boards with accessories
- Number of employees: Under 25 (11-50)
- Website: www.gumstix.com

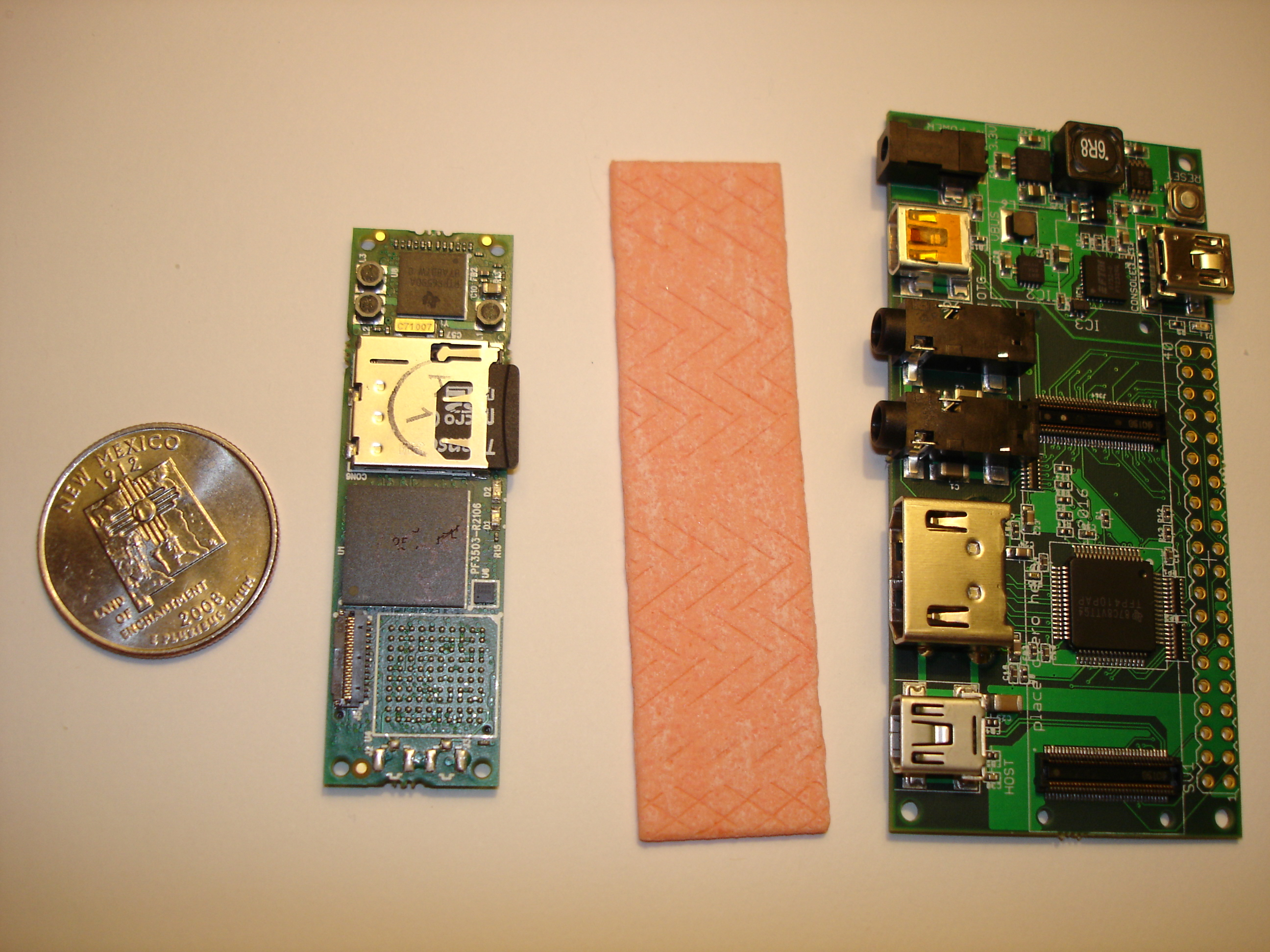
A side-by-side size comparison of a US Quarter, a Gumstix Overo Earth, a stick of gum, and the Gumstix Summit expansion board.

Gumstix, Inc., was an American multinational corporation headquartered in Redwood City, California. It developed and manufactured small system boards comparable in size to a stick of gum. In 2003, when it was first fully functional, it used ARM architecture system on a chip (SoC) and an operating system based on Linux 2.6 kernel. It had an online tool called Geppetto that allows users to design their own boards. In August 2013 it started a crowd-funding service to allow a group of users that want to get a custom design manufactured to share the setup costs.

Gumstix ceased operations on December 31, 2025.

== See also ==
- Arduino
- Embedded system
- Raspberry Pi
- Stick PC
