= Acorn Archimedes =

Personal computer

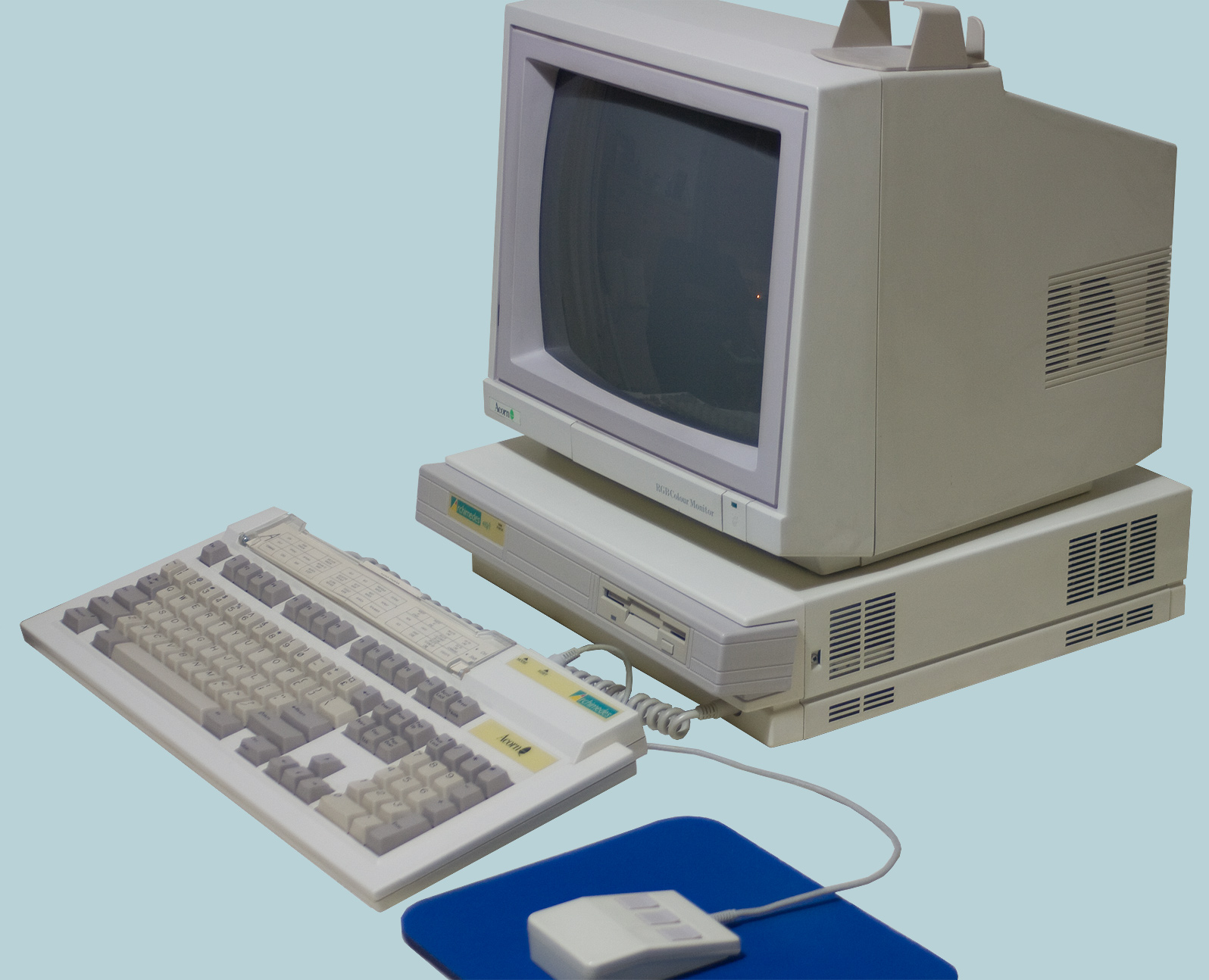
- Archimedes 400/1
- Developer: Acorn Computers
- Type: Personal computer
- Released: June 1987; 39 years ago
- Introductory price: £799–£2299 (circa £2300–£6700 today)
- Discontinued: Mid-1990s
- Operating system: RISC OS or RISC iX
- CPU: ARM
- Memory: 512 KB–16 MB
- Display: 1152×864 monochrome, 640×512 in 16 colours, 640×256 in 256 colours; 1056 × 256 in up to 256 colours (with RISC OS, 132-column modes) and higher, see: Graphical capabilities
- Graphics: VIDC1
- Sound: VIDC1 8 channels, 8-bit (logarithmic), stereo
- Predecessor: BBC Micro
- Successor: A7000, Risc PC

The Acorn Archimedes is a family of personal computers designed by Acorn Computers of Cambridge, England. The systems in this family use Acorn's own ARM architecture processors and initially ran the Arthur operating system, with later models introducing RISC OS and, in a separate workstation range, RISC iX. The first Archimedes models were introduced in 1987, and systems in the Archimedes family were sold until the mid-1990s alongside Acorn's newer Risc PC and A7000 models.

The first Archimedes models, featuring a 32-bit ARM2 RISC CPU running at 8 MHz, provided a significant upgrade from Acorn's previous machines and 8-bit home computers in general. Acorn's publicity claimed a performance rating of 4 MIPS. (Note: These being equivalent to VAX-11/750 instructions.) Later models featured the ARM3 CPU, delivering a substantial performance improvement, and the first ARM system-on-a-chip, the ARM250.

The Archimedes preserves a degree of compatibility with Acorn's earlier machines, offering BBC BASIC, support for running 8-bit applications, and display modes compatible with those earlier machines. Following on from Acorn's involvement with the BBC Micro, two of the first models—the A305 and A310—were given BBC branding.

The name "Acorn Archimedes" is commonly used to describe any of Acorn's contemporary designs based on the same architecture. This architecture can be broadly characterised as involving the ARM CPU and the first generation chipset consisting of MEMC (MEMory Controller), VIDC (VIDeo and sound Controller) and IOC (Input Output Controller).

== History ==
Having introduced the BBC Micro in 1981, Acorn established itself as a major supplier to primary and secondary education in the United Kingdom. However, attempts to replicate this dominance in other sectors, such as home computing with the BBC Micro and Acorn Electron, and in other markets, including the United States and West Germany, were less successful.

As microprocessor and computing technology advanced in the early 1980s, microcomputer manufacturers had to consider evolving their product lines to offer increased capabilities and performance. Acorn's strategy for business computing and development of more capable machines involved a range of "second processor" expansions, including a Z80 second processor running the CP/M operating system, a commitment made by Acorn when securing the BBC Micro contract.

Meanwhile, established platforms like CP/M running on Z80 processors faced competition from the IBM PC running PC DOS and computers with a variety of operating systems on Intel processors such as the 8088 and 8086. Systems using the Motorola 68000 and other processors running the Unix operating system also became available. Apple launched the Lisa and Macintosh computers, and Digital Research introduced its own GEM graphical user interface software, building on previous work by Xerox.

Acorn's strategy seemingly evolved to align with Torch Computers—a company that Acorn considered acquiring—which had already combined BBC Micro hardware with second processors (and modems) to produce their Communicator product line and derivatives. In 1984, Acorn introduced the Acorn Business Computer (ABC) range, based on the BBC Micro architecture, offering models with different second processors and capabilities to respond to computing trends at the time. These models received generally favourable reviews from the computing press. However, with Acorn facing financial strain, the company was rescued by Olivetti in 1985, leaving the ABC's future uncertain in the expected restructuring process. Ultimately, only one of the variants—the Acorn Cambridge Workstation—would reach the market, in a somewhat different form than originally planned.

The demise of the Acorn Business Computer left Acorn purely with a range of 8-bit microcomputer products, leaving the company vulnerable to competitors introducing 16-bit and 32-bit machines. The increasing dominance of MS-DOS in the business market and advocacy for the use of such software in the education sector left Acorn at risk of potential exclusion from its core market. Meanwhile, competing machines attempted to offer a degree of compatibility with the BBC Micro, enticing schools to upgrade to newer, more powerful non-Acorn machines while retaining access to software developed and purchased for Acorn's "aging machine". Acorn's ability to respond convincingly to these competitive threats was evidently constrained: the BBC Model B+ was merely a redesigned BBC Model B (with some heritage in the ABC endeavour) providing some extra memory but costing more than its predecessor, being labelled as a "stop gap" by Acorn User's technical editor, expressing frustration at opportunities not taken for cost reduction and at a general lack of technological innovation in that "Acorn has never shown interest in anything as exciting as the 68000". Disillusionment was sufficient for some software producers to signal a withdrawal from the Acorn market.

Other commentators who responded to the B+ suggested that Acorn pursue the second processor strategy more aggressively, leveraging the existing user base of the BBC Micro while those users were still using the machine. In 1986, Acorn introduced the BBC Master series, starting with the Master 128 which re-emphasised second processors in the form of internally fitted "co-processors". Although a modest evolution of the existing 6502-based platform, enthusiasm for the series was somewhat greater than that for the B+ models, with dealers and software developers citing the expansion capabilities and improved compatibility over the B+. However, the competitiveness of these co-processors proved to be constrained by hardware limitations, compatibility and pricing, with a Master 512 system featuring a Master 128 and 80186 co-processor comparing unfavourably to complete IBM PC-compatible systems. The planned Master Scientific product was never launched, leaving potential customers with the existing Cambridge Co-Processor expansion as their only available option.

Attitudes towards Acorn and its technological position changed somewhat in late 1985 as news of its RISC microprocessor development effort emerged, potentially encouraging Olivetti to continue its support for the company at "a critical stage" in its refinancing of Acorn. Subsequent commentary suggested the availability of this microprocessor—the Acorn RISC Machine—in future computers as well as in an evaluation board for the BBC Micro, although such a board—the ARM Evaluation System—would only be announced in mid-1986 at a cost of £4500. Having also developed the additional support chips required to make up a complete microcomputer, Acorn was regarded as having leapt ahead of its nearest competitors.

On the eve of the announcement of Acorn's 32-bit ARM-based microcomputer products, prototypes designated A1 and A500 were demonstrated on the BBC television programme Micro Live exhibiting BASIC language performance ten times faster than a newly introduced 80386-based computer from perennial education sector rival Research Machines, with suggestions made that the machines would carry the BBC branding. Revealingly, Acorn's managing director noted, "Over the past two years we've paid the price of having no 16-bit micro." (Note: Acorn had, in fact, produced the 16-bit Acorn Communicator for specialised markets, the Master 512 variant of the BBC Master series, and had sold the Olivetti M19 under its own brand. The company had also sold the 32-bit Acorn Cambridge Workstation to academic and scientific markets.)

== Models ==
The first available models in the family were the A305, A310 and A440, introduced in 1987, followed by the A3000, A410/1, A420/1 and A440/1 in 1989, A540 in 1990, A5000 in 1991, A4 in 1992, with the A3010, A3020 and A4000 being the final models, also introduced in 1992.

=== A300 and A400 series ===
Powered by an ARM2 (Acorn RISC Machine) processor, the Acorn Archimedes was variously described as "the first RISC machine inexpensive enough for home use", and "the first commercially-available RISC-based microcomputer". (Note: Note that the IBM RT PC, and certain HP PA-RISC workstations were already available in 1986. The SGI IRIS 4D series was also introduced in March 1987.) The first models were released in June 1987, as the 300 and 400 series. The 400 series included four expansion slots and an ST-506 controller for an internal hard drive, whereas the 300 series required the addition of a backplane to gain expansion slot capabilities. A two slot backplane could be added to the 300 series as an official upgrade, with the possibility of 4-slot backplane being available from third parties, but a hard drive expansion card was also required for these machines, occupying one slot.

Both series included the Arthur operating system (later replaced by RISC OS as a paid-for upgrade), BBC BASIC programming language, and an emulator for Acorn's earlier BBC Micro, and were mounted in two-part cases with a small central unit, monitor on top, and a separate keyboard and three-button mouse (the middle one used for pop-up context menus of the operating system). All models featured eight-channel 8-bit stereo sound and were capable of displaying 256 colours on screen.

Three models were initially released with different amounts of memory, the A305, A310 and A440. The 400 series models were replaced in 1989 by the A410/1, the A420/1 and A440/1, these featuring an upgraded MEMC1a and RISC OS. Earlier models which shipped with Arthur could be upgraded to RISC OS 2 by replacing the ROM chip containing the operating system. Because the ROM chips contained the operating system, the computer booted instantly into its GUI system, familiar from the Atari ST.

Despite the A310 being limited to 1 MB of RAM officially, several companies made upgrades to 2 MB and 4 MB, with the smaller upgrades augmenting the built-in RAM and the larger upgrades replacing it entirely. The 400 series were officially limited to 4 MB of RAM, but several companies released 8 MB upgrades that provided an extra MEMC chip plus 4 MB of RAM to complement an existing 4 MB of fitted RAM.

=== A3000 ===
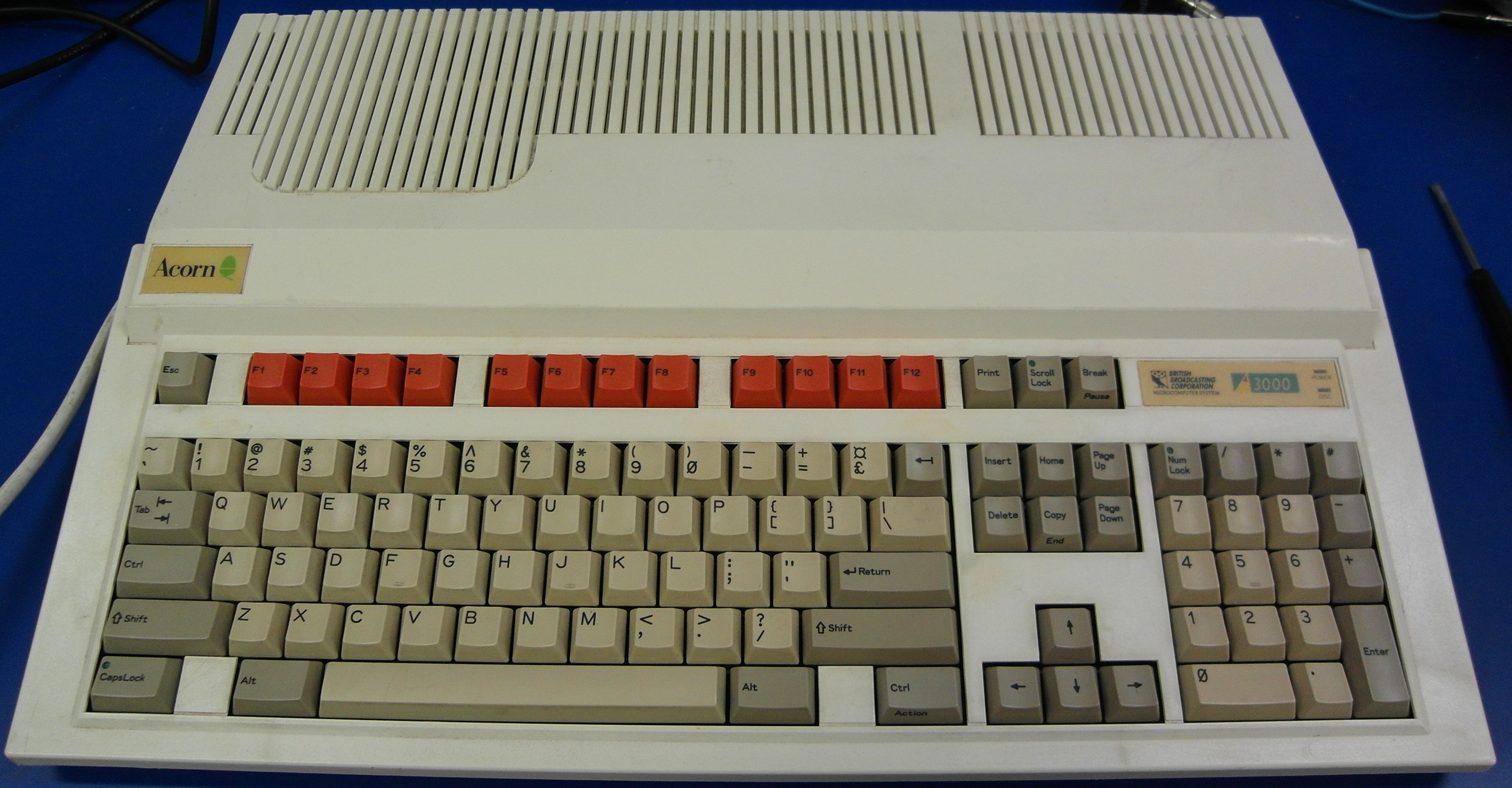
Acorn Archimedes A3000 computer main unit

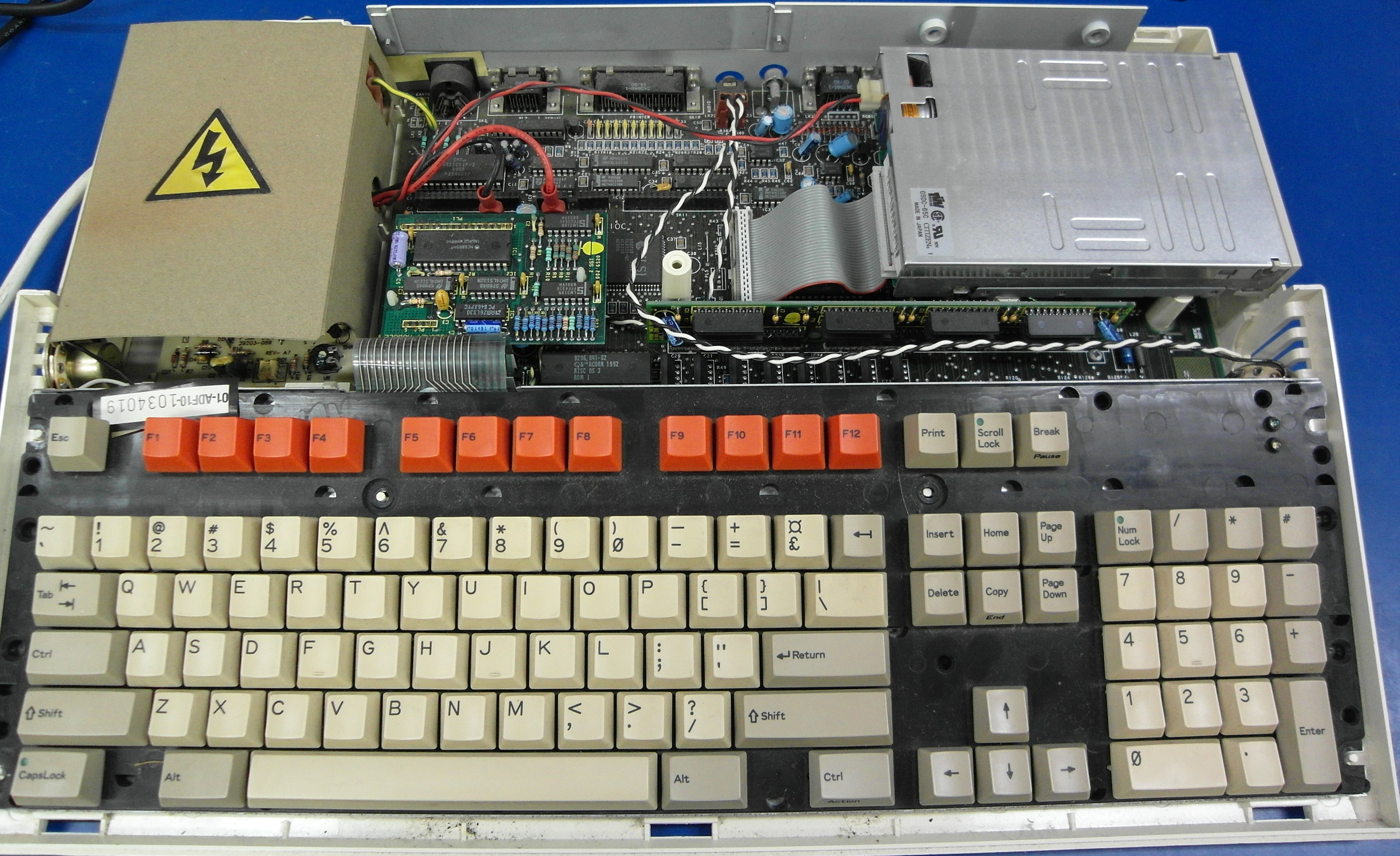
Acorn Archimedes A3000 computer with cover removed

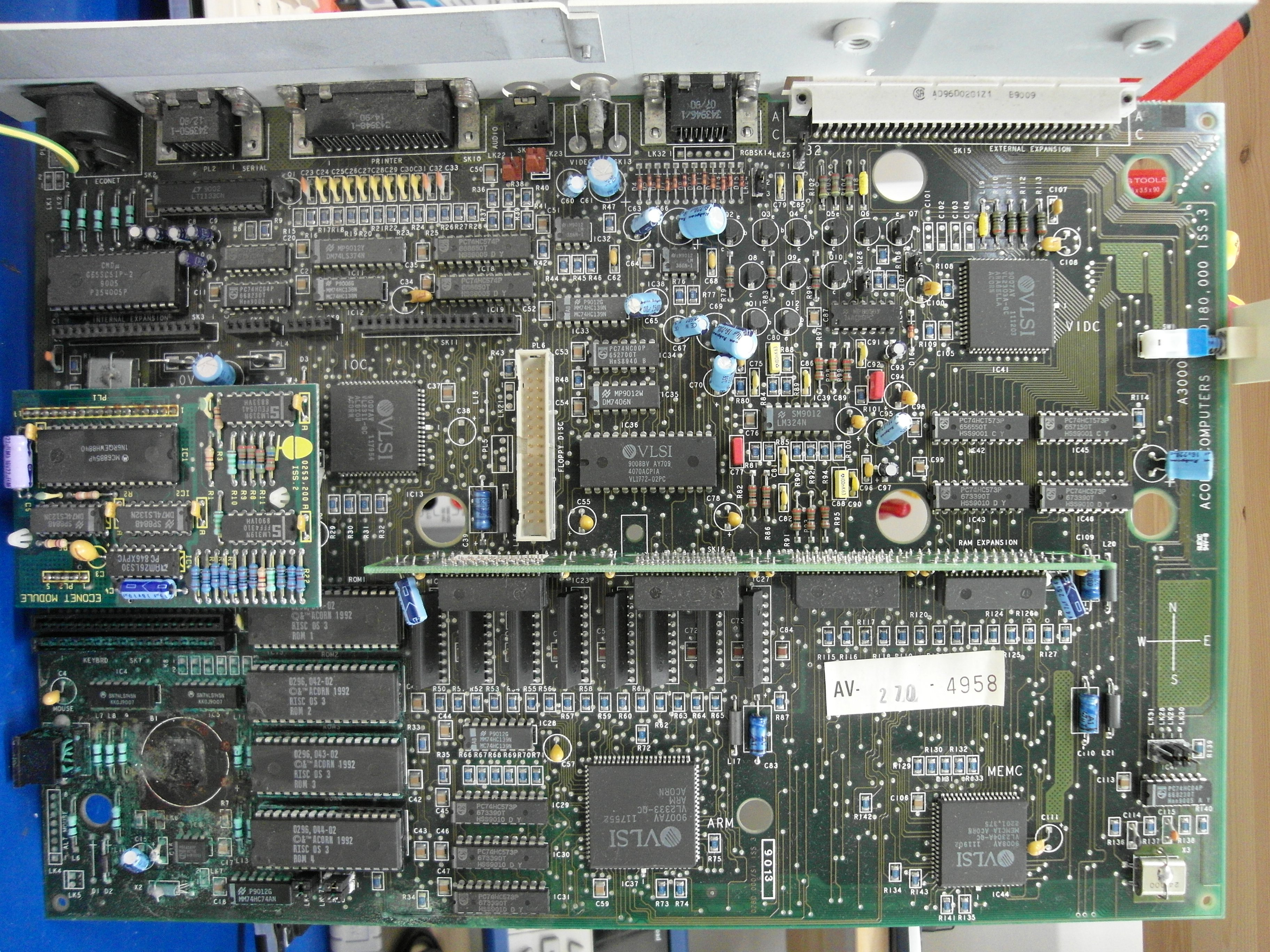
Acorn Archimedes A3000 main PCB. Corrosion from a leaky NiCd battery can be seen in the bottom left corner.

In early 1989, speculation about new machines in the Archimedes range envisaged a low-cost, cut-down model with 512 KB of RAM to replace the A305 in a fashion reminiscent of the Master Compact. This speculation evolved to more accurately predict a machine with 1 MB of RAM aimed at junior or primary schools. Other commentators correctly predicted the provision of an internal disc drive and a single "special" podule slot. However, any new, low-cost product providing support for up to 2 MB of RAM also raised questions about the future of the 300 series, given the limitation of the 300 series to a maximum of 1 MB at that time.

Concurrently with these rumoured product development efforts, work had commenced on a successor to the Arthur operating system, initially named Arthur 2 but renamed to RISC OS 2 for launch. In May 1989, a number of new machines were introduced along with RISC OS 2: the 300 series was phased out in favour of the new BBC A3000, and the 400 series were replaced by the improved 400/1 series models. Having been developed in a "remarkably short timescale of nine months", the machine was the "major learning vehicle" for an integrated CAD system introduced at Acorn employing products from Valid Logic Systems, and it was reported that the A3000 was the first home microcomputer to use surface mount technology in its construction, with the machine being built at Acorn's longstanding manufacturing partner, AB Electronics.

The A3000 used an 8 MHz ARM2 and was supplied with 1 MB of RAM and RISC OS on 512 KB of ROM. Unlike the previous models, the A3000 came in a single-part case similar to the BBC Micro, Amiga 500 and Atari ST computers, with the keyboard and disc drive integrated into a base unit "slightly smaller than the Master 128". Despite the machine's desktop footprint, being larger than a simple keyboard, the case was not designed to support a monitor. Acorn offered a monitor stand that attached to the machine, this being bundled with Acorn's Learning Curve package, and PRES announced a monitor plinth and external disc drive case.

The new model sported only a single internal expansion slot, which was physically different from that of the earlier models, although electrically similar. An external connector could interface to existing expansion cards, with an external case for such cards being recommended and anticipated at the machine's launch, and one such solution subsequently being provided by PRES's expansion system. Acorn announced a combined user port and MIDI expansion for the internal slot at the machine's launch, priced at £49. To enable the machine's serial port, an upgrade costing £19 was required, and Econet support was also an optional extra.

Although only intended to be upgradeable to 2 MB of RAM, third-party vendors offered upgrades to 4 MB along with expansions offering additional disc drive connections and combinations of user and analogue ports, both of these helping those upgrading from Acorn's 8-bit products, particularly in education, to make use of existing peripherals such as 5.25-inch drives, input devices and data logging equipment. Simtec Electronics even offered a RAM upgrade to 8 MB for the A3000 alongside other models. In 1996, IFEL announced a memory upgrade for the A3000 utilising a generic 72-pin SIMM module to provide 4 MB of RAM. Hard drive expansions based on ST506, SCSI and IDE technologies were also offered by a range of vendors.

With the "British Broadcasting Corporation Computer System" branding, the "main market" for the A3000 was schools and education authorities, and the educational price of £529—not considerably more expensive than the BBC Master—was considered to be competitive and persuasive in getting this particular audience to upgrade to Acorn's 32-bit systems. The retail price of £649 plus VAT was considered an "expensive alternative" to the intended competition—the Commodore Amiga and Atari ST—but many times faster than similarly priced models of those ranges. The Amiga 500, it was noted, cost a "not-so-bargain" £550 once upgraded to 1 MB of RAM.

The relative affordability of the A3000 compared to the first Archimedes machines and the release of RISC OS helped to convince educational software producers of the viability of the platform. Shortly after the A3000's launch, one local education authority had already ordered 500 machines, aiming to introduce the A3000 to its primary schools in addition to other levels of education. Such was the success of the model that it alone had 37 percent of the UK schools market in a nine-month period in 1991 and, by the end of that year, was estimated to represent 15 percent of the 500,000 or more computers installed in the country's schools.

The appeal of the A3000 to education may also have motivated the return of Microvitec to the Acorn market with the Cub3000 monitor: a re-engineered version of the Cub monitor that was popular amongst institutional users of the original BBC Micro. Having been "nowhere to be seen" when the Archimedes was released, Microvitec had sought to introduce its own Cubpack range of IBM PC-compatible personal computers for the education market offering some BBC BASIC compatibility, building on an estimated 80 percent market share for 14-inch colour monitors in the sector, and aspiring to launch an "interactive video workstation".

The introduction of the A3000 also saw Acorn regaining a presence in mainstream retail channels, through a deal with high street retailer Dixons to sell the computer at "business centre" outlets, followed by agreements with the John Lewis and Alders chains. Acorn also sought to secure the interest of games publishers, hosting a conference in August 1989 for representatives of "the top 30 software houses, including Ocean, Domark, US Gold, Grand Slam and Electronic Arts".

Marketing efforts towards home users continued in 1990 with the introduction of The Learning Curve: a bundle of A3000 and application software priced at £699 plus VAT, requiring a SCART capable television (and appropriate "active" cable), or bundled with a colour monitor and Acorn's monitor stand for £949 plus VAT. The software, having a retail value of around £200, consisted of the second, RISC OS compliant version of Acorn's First Word Plus, the hypermedia application Genesis, and the PC Emulator software, with an introductory video presented by Fred Harris, formerly of Micro Live. Aiming at the "pre-Christmas market" in 1990, another bundle called Jet Set offered a more entertainment-focused collection of software valued at £200 including Clares' Interdictor flight simulator, Domark's Trivial Pursuit, Superior Golf, and the Euclid 3D modelling package from Ace Computing. The price of this bundle was £747.50 which also included a television modulator developed by the bundle's distributor, ZCL, designed for use with "any TV set" and offering a "monitor quality" picture.

Pre-launch speculation for the A3000 had suggested the inclusion of a TV modulator and a possible price of £399 for a 512 KB "Archimedes 205" machine aimed at the home market. Rumours about the integration of various elements of Acorn's chipset—specifically, MEMC and VIDC—to "do an Electron" were regarded as logistically demanding and thus unlikely to reduce cost. Such increased integration and targeting of the home market was later pursued with the introduction of the A3010 in 1992.

=== A540 ===
The A540, introduced in late 1990, was an anticipated consequence of Acorn's Unix workstation development, offering the same general specification as Acorn's R260 Unix workstation (running RISC iX) but without built-in Ethernet support and running RISC OS 2 instead of Unix. It was Acorn's first machine to be fitted with the ARM3 processor as standard, supporting up to 16 MB of RAM, and included higher speed SCSI and provision for connecting genlock devices. The memory access frequency was raised to 12 MHz in the A540, compared to 8 MHz in earlier models, thus providing enhanced system performance over earlier models upgraded with ARM3 processors. The hardware design featured memory modules, each providing their own memory controller and 4 MB of RAM, and a processor module providing the ARM3 and including a slot for a floating point accelerator (FPA) chip, the latter offering the possibility (subsequently unrealised) of processor upgrades. The FPA, replacing Acorn's previous floating point podule, was scheduled to be available in 1991. Much delayed, the FPA finally became available in 1993.

=== A5000 and A4 laptop ===
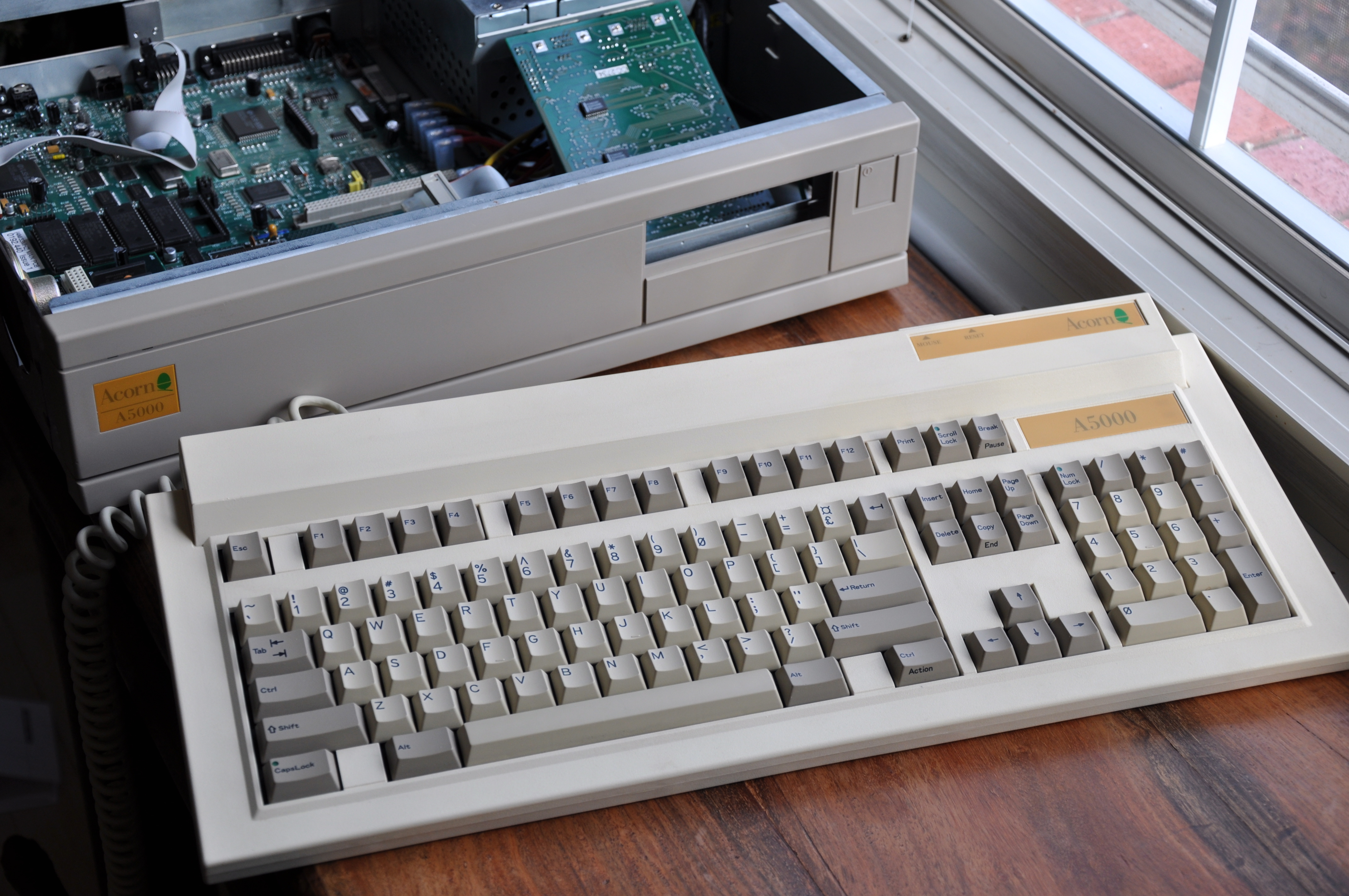
A5000 with top removed

In late 1991, the A5000 was launched to replace the A440/1 machine in the existing product range. With the existing A400/1 series regarded as "a little tired", being largely unchanged from the A400 models introduced four years previously, the A5000 was regarded (by one reviewer, at least) as "the biggest leap forward for Acorn since the introduction of the Archimedes in 1987", introducing a combination of the ARM3 processor and RISC OS 3 for the first time in a new Acorn product, being "the machine the A540 should have been - smaller, neater, with higher capacity drives and all the same speed for about half the cost". The A5000 initially ran RISC OS 3.0, although after bug fixes most shipped with RISC OS 3.10 or 3.11.

The A5000 featured the new 25 MHz ARM3 processor, 2 or 4 MB of RAM, either a 40 MB or an 80 MB hard drive and a more conventional pizza box-style two-part case. With IBM-compatible PCs offering increasingly better graphical capabilities, they had not merely matched the capabilities of Acorn's machines, but in offering resolutions of 1024 × 768 in 16 or 256 colours and with 24-bit palettes, they had surpassed them. The A5000 was the first Acorn to adopt a 15-pin VGA connector and (along with the earlier A540) supported the SVGA resolution of 800 × 600 in 16 colours, although the observation that "Archimedes machines have simply not kept pace" arguably remained. Earlier models could also benefit from the video performance of the A5000 via third party upgrades such as the Computer Concepts ColourCard Gold.

It was also the first Archimedes to feature a high density capable floppy disc drive as standard. This natively supported various formats including MS-DOS and Atari ST discs with formatted capacities of 720 KB and 1.44 MB. The native ADFS floppy format had a slightly larger capacity of 800 KB for double density or 1.6 MB for high density. Later A5000s featured a 33 MHz ARM3, 2 or 4 MB of RAM, and an 80 or 160 MB hard drive. Particularly useful in this revised A5000 was the use of a socket for the MEMC1a chip, meaning that memory expansions beyond 4 MB could more easily replace the single MEMC1a, plugging in a card providing the two MEMC1a devices required to support 8 MB. Earlier A5000s required desoldering of the fitted MEMC1a to provide such a socket.

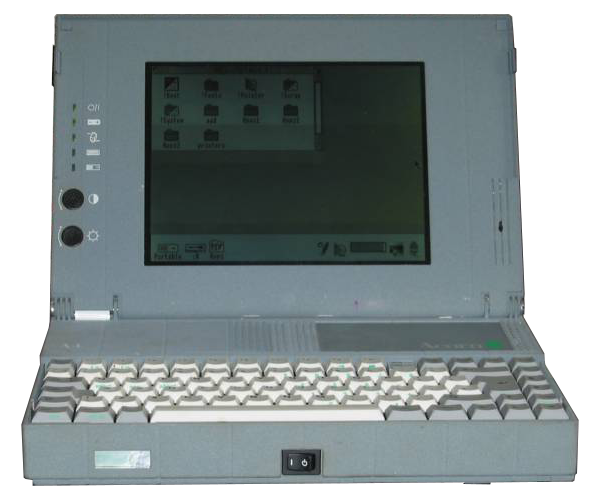
A4 laptop

In 1992, Acorn introduced the A4 laptop computer featuring a slower 24 MHz version of the ARM3 processor (compared to the 25 MHz ARM3 in the A5000), supporting a 6 MHz power-saving mode, and providing between 2.5 and 4 hours of usage on battery power. The machine featured a 9-inch passive matrix LCD screen capable of displaying a maximum resolution of 640 × 480 pixels in 15 levels of grey, also featuring a monitor port which offered the same display capabilities as an A5000. No colour version was planned. A notable omission from the machine was a built-in pointing device, requiring users to navigate with the cursor keys or attach a conventional Acorn three-button mouse, such as the Logitech mouse bundled with the machine.

Other expansion ports available on the A4 were serial and parallel ports, a PS/2 connector for an external keyboard, a headphone connector, and support for an Econet expansion (as opposed to an Econet port itself). No other provision for expansion was made beyond the fitting of the Econet card and a hard drive. The A4 effectively fit an A5000 into a portable case, having a motherboard "roughly half the size of a sheet of A4 paper", adding extra hardware for power management and driving the LCD, the latter employing an Acorn-designed controller chip using "time-domain dithering" to produce the different grey levels. Just as the processor could be slowed down to save power, so the 12 MHz RAM could be slowed to 3 MHz, with various subsystems also being switched off as appropriate, and with power saving being activated after "more than a second or so" of user inactivity. The A4's case itself was used by Olivetti and Triumph-Adler models, particularly the Triumph-Adler Walkstation which did integrate a built-in pointing device, this being described as an "all-but-unusable touchpad mouse-controller" by one reviewer.

Launch pricing of the A4 set the entry-level model with 2 MB of RAM at £1399 plus VAT, with the higher-tier model with 4 MB of RAM and 60 MB hard drive at £1699 plus VAT. Education pricing was £1099 and £1399 respectively. Acorn foresaw educational establishments taking to the machine where existing models were needing to be moved around between classrooms or even taken on field trips, although review commentary noted that "the A4 is too expensive for schools to afford in large numbers" and that contemporary Apple and IBM PC-compatible models offered strong competition for business users.

Peripherals for the A4 were eventually produced, with Acorn providing the previously announced Econet card, and with Atomwide providing Ethernet and SCSI adapters utilising the bidirectional parallel port present on the A4 (and also the A5000 and later machines). Atomwide also offered the "Hi-Point" trackball peripheral modified to work as an Acorn-compatible mouse which attached to the side of the unit.

=== A3010, A3020, A4000 ===
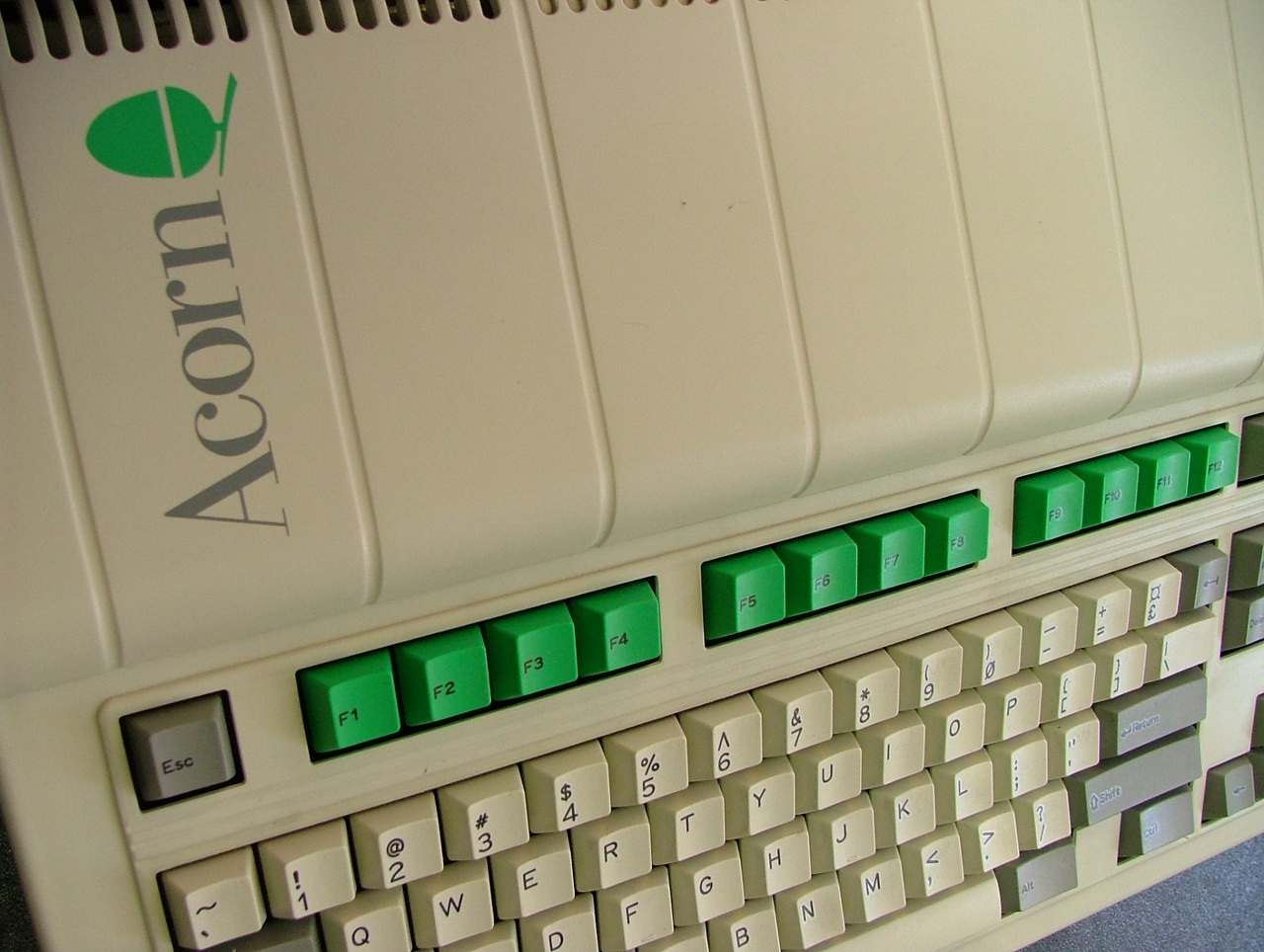
A3010

In 1992, several new models were introduced to complement the A3000 and to replace the low-end A400 series models: the A3010, A3020 and A4000. Launched alongside the Acorn Pocket Book, a distinct product based on the Psion Series 3, the machines heralded "a changed company, with new direction" and the availability of Acorn products in mainstream high street stores including Dixons, John Lewis and Argos as well as mail order catalogues. Thus, a transition had begun from a range of machines of different vintages that still included the A3000 (at the low end) and the A540 (at the high end) to a range that purely featured more recently designed models including the A5000 as the high-end offering and the A4 portable.

These new models utilised the first ARM system-on-a-chip—the ARM250 microprocessor—a single-chip design including the functionality of an ARM2 (or ARM3 without cache), the IOC1, VIDC1a and MEMC1a chips all "integrated into a single giant chip" and fabricated using a 1 micron process. The ARM250, running at a higher 12 MHz clock frequency and used in conjunction with faster 80ns memory chips, compared to the 8 MHz of the ARM2 and the 125ns memory of the A3000, gave a potential 50% performance increase over such older systems, achieving a reported 7 MIPS. (Note: This presumably being stated as VAX-11/750 MIPS and therefore approximately equivalent to around 4.3 VAX MIPS.)

Some early units of the A3010 did not actually utilise the ARM250, instead embodying a "mezzanine" board carrying the four separate devices comprising the complete chipset, with this board plugged into the motherboard in place of the ARM250. An Acorn representative indicated this solution was pursued to meet retailing deadlines, whereas an ARM representative denied that any "serious delays" had occurred in the development of the ARM250, noting the mezzanine board had been useful during the design process; owners did not need to upgrade this board to a genuine ARM250 as it was "functionally identical" to the ARM250. One inadvertent advantage that the mezzanine board conferred was the ability to upgrade the ARM2 on the board to an ARM3, this being a popular upgrade for previous ARM2-based models that was incompatible with the ARM250. (Note: In a review in Personal Computer World, it was noted that there was "no prospect of 'an ARM350'" to provide an equivalent upgrade. Subsequent system-on-a-chip products were eventually made and used in the A7000 and A7000+, albeit of a different generation, and such parts have since become commonplace.) However, performing such an upgrade involves modifications to both the "Adelaide" mezzanine board and the ARM3 upgrade board employed in the refit. For machines fitted with an actual ARM250 processor, the closest alternative to an ARM3 upgrade in terms of performance enhancement was the Simtec "Turbo RAM" upgrade which provided 4 MB of faster RAM and gave a 40 percent improvement in overall system performance.

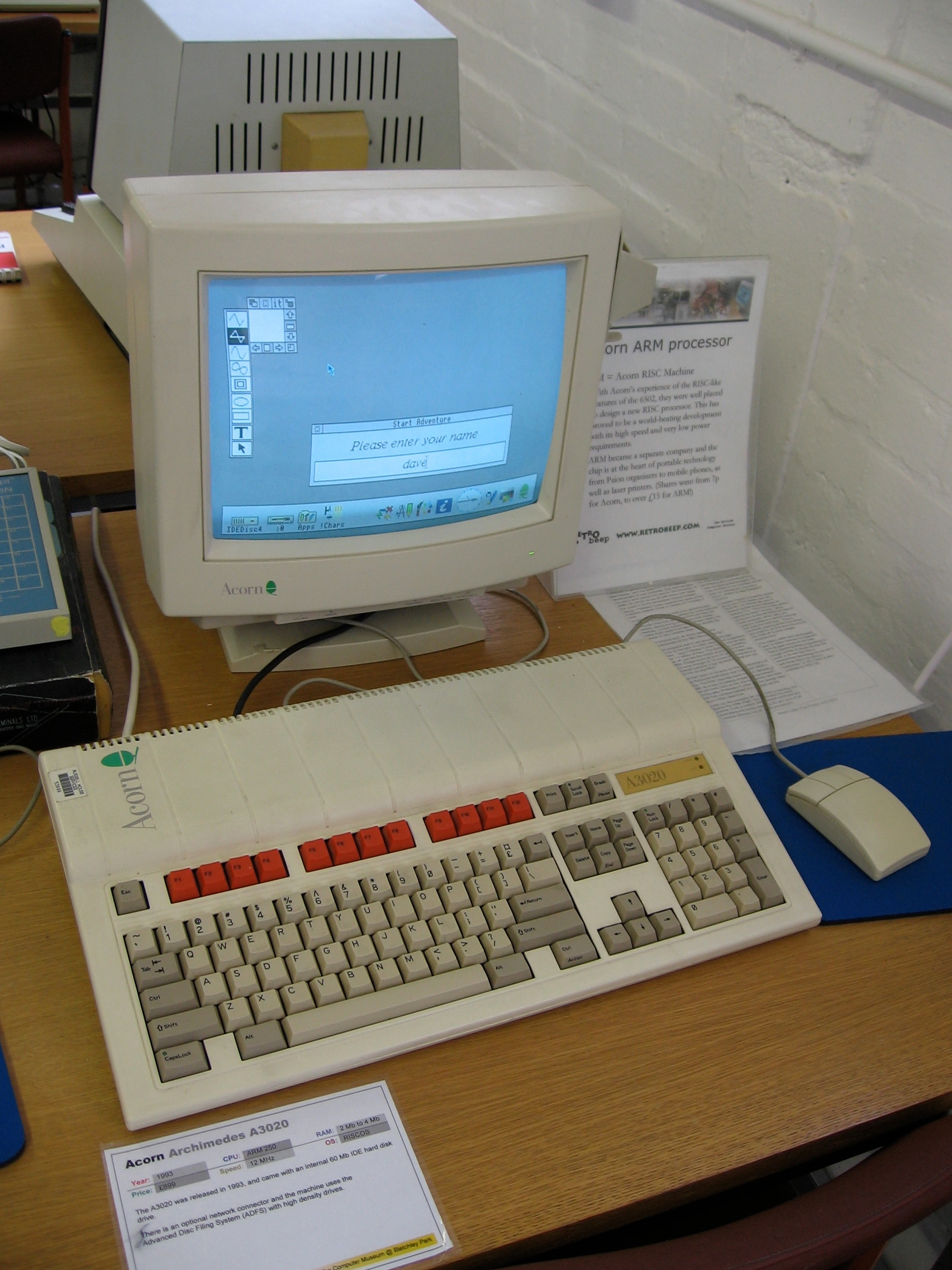
Acorn Archimedes A3020 GUI

These machines were supplied with RISC OS 3.10 or 3.11. The A30x0 series had a one-piece design, similar to the A3000 but slightly more shallow, while the A4000 looked like a slightly slimmer A5000. The A3010 model was intended to be a home computer, featuring a TV modulator (for use with traditional PAL-standard televisions, SCART televisions already being supported by all of these models) and standard 9-pin joystick ports, while the A3020 targeted the primary and middle school educational markets, featuring an optional built-in 2.5-inch hard drive and a dedicated network interface socket, both capabilities being provided without requiring the machine's "mini-podule" expansion slot. Meanwhile, the A4000 was aimed at the secondary education and office markets, offering a separate adjustable keyboard to comply with ergonomics regulations deemed applicable to these users. Technically, the A4000 was almost functionally identical to the A3020, only differing in the supported hard disk size (3.5-inch in the A4000), this due to the machine's different casing. Despite the resemblance to the A5000, the A4000 along with the other models only provided a single "mini-podule" expansion slot, just as the A3000 did. All three ARM250-based machines could be upgraded to 4 MB with plug-in chips: though the A3010 was designed for 2 MB, third party upgrades overcame this. In 1996, IFEL announced a memory upgrade for the range utilising a generic 72-pin SIMM module to provide 4 MB of RAM.

Pricing started at just under £500 including VAT for the Family Solution bundle: an unexpanded A3010 with no monitor (to be used with a television), combined with the EasiWord word processor and one game (initially Quest for Gold). The existing Learning Curve bundle, updated to incorporate the A3010 upgraded to 2 MB of RAM in place of the A3000, included an Acorn colour monitor, the PC Emulator and a suite of Genesis hypermedia applications for a price of £799. The A4000 Home Office bundle combined the A4000 with Acorn colour monitor, Icon Technology's EasiWriter 2 "professional word processor" and Iota's Desktop Database application for a price of around £1175. The retail pricing of the A3010 was notable as making it the cheapest of any Archimedes machine sold. With games consoles gaining popularity, Acorn apparently attempted to target the "games machine plus" market with the A3010 by appealing to "the more knowledgeable, sophisticated and educationally concerned parents", this against a backdrop of established competing products having been heavily discounted: the Amiga 500 having been reduced to £299, for instance. In 1993, Commodore would subsequently offer the entry-level Amiga 600 at a price of only £199, although with Commodore "losing money on a big scale" while Acorn remained profitable, such discounting was not regarded as a threat to the A3010.

The pricing and bundles involving these machines were updated in late 1993, introducing a new Action Pack in place of the Family Solution, featuring the game Zool plus Icon Technology's StartWrite word processor. This bundle effectively reduced the price of the A3010 to £399 including VAT, reportedly making it "the cheapest Risc machine yet". The Learning Curve was revised to feature Acorn's own Advance integrated suite, together with the PC Emulator and DR DOS 6, and the bundle was also made available in conjunction with the A4000. The Home Office bundle was updated with Iota's DataPower replacing Desktop Database, and with Colton Software's PipeDream 4 and Acorn's PC Emulator being added to augment EasiWriter. A variety of demonstration programs and an audio training tape were also provided with the bundles. At the time of these product revisions, the A3020 had become absent from related promotional material, even material aimed at the educational purchaser, although it remained in Acorn's price list presumably for the interest of institutional purchasers.

Acorn's marketing relationships with high street retailers were somewhat problematic. While outlets such as the John Lewis Partnership proved to be successful marketing partners, electrical retailer Dixons seemingly made relatively little effort to sell Acorn machines despite promising "greater opportunities" in 1993 after earlier criticism. In late 1994, Acorn appointed a sole distributor for the A3010 Action Pack and Learning Curve bundles, with the pricing of the former reduced to only £299. Persisting with the strategy that some purchasers might choose a product positioned between games consoles and traditional PC-compatibles, the distributor, ZCL, aimed to take advantage of the absence of Commodore during the Christmas 1994 season. As the Christmas 1995 season approached, Beebug purchased Acorn's "entire remaining inventory", offering the machine for £135 including VAT together with various "value-added packs".

Production of the A3020 and A4000 ceased in 1995, with remaining stocks to be sold during 1996, due to their lack of conformance with newly introduced European Union electrical and electronics regulations. This left the A7000 as Acorn's entry-level desktop system, and appropriate pricing adjustments were expected, particularly as faster versions of the A7000 were anticipated (and eventually delivered in the form of the A7000+).

=== Later A-series models ===
The A7000, despite its name being reminiscent of the Archimedes naming conventions, was actually more similar to the Risc PC, the line of RISC OS computers that succeeded the Archimedes in 1994. It lacked, however, the DEBI expansion slots and multi-slice case that characterized the Risc PC (though by removing the CD-ROM drive, a backplane with one slot could be fitted).

=== List of models ===
Model	Memory (RAM)	Hard disk space	ARM processor (single core)	Launch date	UK retail price at launch	Notes
BBC Archimedes 305	512 KB	—	ARM2	July 1987	£799	
BBC Archimedes 310	1 MB	—	ARM2	July 1987	£875	
BBC Archimedes 310M	1 MB	—	ARM2	July 1987	£960	Includes PC emulation software
Acorn Archimedes 410	1 MB	—	ARM2	July 1987	£1,399	Announced but not produced
Acorn Archimedes 440	4 MB	20 MB	ARM2	July 1987	£2,299	
BBC A3000	1 MB	—	ARM2	May 1989	£649	This model was the last BBC-branded microcomputer until the BBC Micro Bit
Acorn Archimedes 410/1	1 MB	(ST506 interface on motherboard)	ARM2	June 1989	£999	Improved MEMC1A memory controller over previous 4x0 model
Acorn Archimedes 420/1	2 MB	20 MB ST506	ARM2	June 1989	£1,099	
Acorn Archimedes 440/1	4 MB	40 MB ST506	ARM2	June 1989	£1,299	Improved MEMC1A memory controller over previous 4x0 model
Acorn R140	4 MB	47 MB ST506	ARM2	June 1989	£3,500	RISC iX workstation
Acorn Archimedes 540	4 MB (max. 16 MB)	100 MB SCSI	ARM3	June 1990	£3,444	
Acorn R225	4 MB	—	ARM3	July 1990	£1,995	RISC iX network workstation
Acorn R260	8 MB	100 MB SCSI	ARM3	July 1990	£3,995	RISC iX workstation
Acorn A5000	1, 2, 4 or 8 MB	20 MB to 160 MB IDE	ARM3	September 1991	£999 or £1,499	25 or 33 MHz ARM3 processor, launched with various sub-models
Acorn A4	2 or 4 MB	40 or 60 MB IDE (2.5")	ARM3	June 1992	£1,399 or £1,699	Notebook model with ARM3 processor clocked at 24 MHz, 640x480 greyscale LCD screen
Acorn A3010	1 MB	—	ARM2/ARM250	September 1992	£499	Early models had an ARM2 mezzanine processor board codenamed "Adelaide"
Acorn A3020	2 MB	Optional 60 MB (or 80 MB) IDE (2.5")	ARM250	September 1992	£880	Price included colour monitor
Acorn A4000	2 MB	80 MB IDE (3.5")	ARM250	September 1992	£1115	Price included colour monitor

Also produced, but never sold commercially were:

- A500: 4 MB RAM, ST506 interface, Archimedes development machine
- A680 and M4: 8 MB RAM, SCSI on motherboard, RISC iX development machines

== Software ==
=== Arthur operating system ===
Reminiscent of the BBC Micro upon its release, the earliest Archimedes models were delivered with provisional versions of the Arthur operating system, for which upgrades were apparently issued free of charge, thus avoiding the controversy around early ROM upgrades for the BBC Micro. In early 1988, Arthur 1.2 was delivered in an attempt to fix the deficiencies and problems in the earlier versions of the software. However, even after Arthur 1.2 had been released, a reported 100 documented bugs regarded as "mostly quite obscure" persisted, with Acorn indicating that a "new, enhanced version" of the operating system was under development.

=== Early applications ===
Following on from the release of Arthur 1.2, Acorn itself offered a "basic word processor", ArcWriter, intended for "personal correspondence, notices and short articles" and to demonstrate the window, menu and pointer features of the system, employing built-in printer fonts for rapid printed output. The software was issued free of charge for registered users, although Acorn indicated that it would not produce a "definitive" word processor for the platform, in contrast to the BBC Micro where the View word processor had been central to Acorn's office software range. However, Acorn did also announce a port of the 1st Word package, First Word Plus, for the platform. ArcWriter was poorly received, with window repainting issues demonstrated as a particular problem, and with users complaining of "serious bugs". Although taking advantage of the Arthur desktop environment and using anti-aliased fonts, complaints were made about "blurred and smudged" characters and slow display updates when changing fonts or styles on low-memory machines like the A305. An early competitor, Graphic Writer, was received more favourably but provided its own full-screen user interface. Neither were regarded as competitive with established products on other platforms.

Several software companies immediately promised software for the Archimedes, most notably Computer Concepts, Clares and Minerva, with Advanced Memory Systems, BBC Soft and Logotron being other familiar software publishers. Autodesk, Grafox and GST were newcomers to the Acorn market. However, in early 1988, many software developers were reportedly holding off on releasing software for the Archimedes until the release of a stable operating system, with Acorn offering to lend Arthur 1.2 to developers. Claims had been made of confusion amongst potential purchasers of the machine caused by the lack of available software, with Acorn having pursued a strategy of launching the machine first so that independent software developers might have hardware to work with. In order to make the Archimedes more attractive to certain sectors, Acorn announced a £250,000 investment in educational software and indicated a commitment to business software development. Alongside First Word Plus, the Logistix spreadsheet-based business planning package was also commissioned by Acorn from Grafox Limited as a port to the platform. Autodesk released AutoSketch for the Archimedes in 1988, having launched the product in March the same year. Priced at £79 plus VAT, it offered the precision drawing functionality familiar from AutoCad but with "none of the frills" that made the latter product professionally suitable for various markets at pricing that could exceed £2500. On the Archimedes, AutoSketch was reported to run at about five times the speed of a "standard PC-compatible machine".

Although Acorn had restricted itself to supporting the use of its View word processor under BBC emulation on the Archimedes, View Professional—the final iteration of the View suite on Acorn's 8-bit computers—had been advertised as a future product in June 1987 for November availability. View Professional, like the View series, had been developed for Acorn by Mark Colton, and his company—Colton Software—delivered the successor to this product as PipeDream for the Cambridge Computer Z88. In mid-1988, Colton Software announced PipeDream for the Archimedes, priced at £114, following on from the announcement of a version for MS-DOS, establishing a long history of product development for the platform, leading to PipeDream 4 in 1992, followed by PipeDream's eventual successor, Fireworkz, in 1994.

Much early software had consisted of titles converted from the BBC Micro, taking advantage of a degree of compatibility between the different series of machines, with Computer Concepts even going as far as to produce a ROM/RAM hardware expansion for use with the company's existing BBC Micro series products, and Acorn also offering such an expansion alongside a BBC-compatible interfacing expansion. Another element of Acorn's early marketing strategy for the Archimedes was to emphasise the PC Emulator product which was a software-based emulator for IBM PC-compatible systems based on the 8088 processor running "legal MS-DOS programs". Alongside this, plans were also made for the launch of a podule (peripheral module) hardware expansion providing its own 80186 processor, a disk controller and connector for a disk drive.

The PC Emulator in its initial form shipped with MS-DOS 3.21 and required a system with 4 MB of RAM to be able to provide the "full" 640 KB of RAM for DOS programs, with early versions of Arthur only providing 384 KB to DOS on 1 MB systems, but with Arthur 1.2 aiming to provide the more usable 512 KB to DOS on such systems. The emulator was described as having "very few compatibility problems" and was reported by diagnostic utilities as providing an 80188-based system, but the performance of the emulated system was regarded as slow. Acorn reportedly acknowledged this by indicating the imminent availability of "an 80186 co-processor". The podule expansion (or "co-processor") was subsequently postponed in early 1988 (and ultimately cancelled), with Acorn indicating that its price of £300 would have been uncompetitive against complete PC systems costing as little as £500, and that the hardware capabilities to be offered, such as the provision of CGA graphics, would be likely to become outdated as the industry moved to support EGA and VGA graphical standards.

Commentators were disappointed with the incoherent user interface provided by the software platform, with "Logistix looking like a PC, First Word slavishly copying GEM" and "101 other 'user interfaces'" amongst the early offerings. The result was the lack of a "personality" for the machine which risked becoming a system that would "never look as easy or as slick as the Mac". Alongside the introduction of visual and behavioural consistency between applications, personal computer user environments had also evolved from running a single application at a time, moved beyond "desk accessories" (or pop-up programs), normalised the practice of switching between applications, and had begun to provide the ability to run different applications at the same time, with the Macintosh having already done so with its MultiFinder enhancement. Computer Concepts, having begun development of various new applications for the Archimedes, was sufficiently frustrated with Arthur and its lack of "true multi-tasking" that it announced a rival operating system, Impulse, intended to host those applications on the machine.

=== RISC OS ===
Remedying various criticisms of the early operating environment, Acorn previewed RISC OS (or, more formally, RISC OS 2) in late 1988 and announced availability for April 1989. Internally at Acorn, the realisation had dawned that multitasking had become essential in any mainstream computing environment where "the user is likely to use lots of small applications at once, rather than one large application alone", with other graphical environments such as Hewlett Packard's NewWave and IBM's Presentation Manager being considered as the contemporary competition.

Reactions to the upgraded operating system were positive and even enthusiastic, describing RISC OS as giving software developers "the stable platform they have been waiting for" and "a viable alternative to the PC or Mac", also crediting Acorn for having improved on the original nine-month effort in developing Arthur in the following twelve months leading up to the unveiling of RISC OS. For a modest upgrade cost of £29, users received four ROM chips, three discs including several applications, and documentation.

New facilities in RISC OS included co-operative multitasking, a task manager to monitor tasks and memory, versatile file management, "solid" window manipulation ("the whole window moves - not just the outline"), and adaptive rendering of bitmaps and colours, using dithering where necessary, depending on the nature of the selected screen mode. A common printing framework was introduced, with dot-matrix and PostScript printer drivers supplied, with such drivers available for use by all desktop applications. Amongst the selection of applications and tools included with RISC OS were the Draw graphics editor, featuring vector graphics editing and rudimentary manipulation of text (using the anti-aliased fonts familiar from Arthur) and bitmaps, the Edit text editor, the Paint bitmap editor, and the Maestro music editor.

With RISC OS available, Acorn launched new and updated applications to take advantage of the improved desktop environment. One of these, deferred until after the launch of RISC OS, was Acorn Desktop Publisher, a port of Timeworks Publisher, which introduced a significant improvement to the anti-aliased font capabilities through a new outline font manager, offering scalable fonts that were anti-aliased on screen but rendered at the appropriate resolution when printed, even on dot-matrix printers. First Word Plus was also updated to support the new RISC OS desktop environment, albeit retaining its own printer drivers, being positioned as complementing Acorn Desktop Publisher whose emphasis was on page layout as opposed to textual document creation.

As part of an effort to grow the company's share of the home market, Acorn introduced a bundle called The Learning Curve, initially featuring the A3000, optional monitor and a set of applications (First Word Plus, the PC Emulator, and Genesis). This bundle was enhanced later in 1990 to attract buyers to the A420/1, adding Acorn Desktop Publisher and some additional Genesis applications. Acorn's document processing applications also began to see broader competition around this time, with Impression from Computer Concepts and Ovation from Beebug also providing competitive solutions for desktop publishing. Also in 1990, PipeDream 3 became the first version of the PipeDream integrated suite, descended from Acorn's View Professional but developed and marketed by Colton Software, to be made available for the RISC OS desktop.

The launch of the A5000 in late 1991 brought a new version of RISC OS to the market: RISC OS 3. This delivered a range of enhancements to the operating system including multitasking filer operations (meaning that file copying, moving and deletion no longer took over the computer), support for reading and writing DOS format discs, the provision of various bundled applications (Alarm, Calc, Chars, Configure, Draw, Edit, Help and Paint), commonly used outline fonts, and software modules in ROM (instead of needing to be loaded from accompanying floppy discs into RAM), the removal or raising of limits on windows and tasks, the ability to "iconise" windows and pin them to the desktop background (or pinboard), desktop session saving and restoring, screen blanking support, and other printing and networking improvements. Providing the bundled applications and other resources in ROM saved an estimated 150 KB of workspace, thus being beneficial to users of 1 MB machines.

The bundled RISC OS 3 applications were enhanced from their RISC OS 2 versions in various general ways, such as the introduction of keyboard shortcuts, but also with new, specific features. The printing system was also updated to support multiple printers at once, but in this first version of RISC OS 3 background printing was still not supported. The "most obviously improved" application was Draw, acquiring new features including multiple levels of "undo" and "redo" operations, rotated text (benefiting from an updated outline font manager), graduated fills, shape interpolation (or in-betweening) support, and built-in support for converting text into paths. Edit gained improved formatting and searching support plus transparent BASIC program editing facilities. One somewhat visually obvious improvement delivered in RISC OS 3 was the use of "3D window borders" or, more accurately, dedicated bitmaps for window furniture, allowing different desktop styling effects. The appearance of the desktop would eventually shift towards Acorn's "NewLook" desktop theme, previewed in late 1993.

In late 1992, RISC OS 3 was itself updated, becoming RISC OS 3.1 (as opposed to the initial RISC OS 3.0 provided with the A5000) and being made available for all existing Archimedes machines, although A300 series and the original A400 series machines needed a hardware modification to be able to accept the larger 2 MB ROMs, employing a special daughterboard. Various bugs in RISC OS 3.0 were fixed and various other improvements made, making it a worthwhile upgrade for A5000 users. Notably, support for background printing was introduced. VAT-inclusive introductory pricing for the upgrade was £19 for RISC OS 3.0 users and £49 for RISC OS 2.0 users, with the upgrade package including ROMs, support discs and manuals. The non-introductory price of the upgrade was stated as being £89.

The limitations of RISC OS became steadily more apparent, particularly with the appearance of the Risc PC and the demands made on applications taking advantage of its improved hardware capabilities (although merely highlighting issues that were always present), and when contrasted with the gradually evolving Windows and Macintosh System software, these competitors offering or promising new features and usability improvements over their predecessors. Two fundamental deficiencies perceived with RISC OS were a lack of virtual memory support, this permitting larger volumes of data to be handled by using hard disc storage as "slow, auxiliary RAM" (attempted by application-level solutions in certain cases), and the use of cooperative multitasking as opposed to preemptive multitasking to allow multiple applications to run at the same time, with the former relying on applications functioning correctly and considerately, and with the latter putting the system in control of allocating time to applications and thus preventing faulty or inconsiderate applications from hanging or dominating the system. Problems with the storage management and filing systems were also identified. In 1994, the FileCore functionality in RISC OS was still limited to accessing 512 MB of any hard drive, with this being barely larger than the largest supplied Risc PC hard drive at the time. Filing system limitations were also increasingly archaic: 77 files per directory and 10-character filenames, in contrast to more generous constraints imposed by the then-"imminent" Windows 95 and then-current Macintosh System 7 release.

Although an update to the FileCore functionality was delivered in 1995, initially to members of Acorn's enthusiast community, providing support for larger storage partitions (raising the limit to 128 GB), other improvements, such as those providing support for the use of longer filenames, were still only provided by third parties. With adverse financial results and a restructuring of the company in late 1995, Acorn appeared to be considering a more responsive strategy towards customer demands, potentially offering rebadged PC and Mac products alongside Acorn's existing computers, while cultivating a relationship with IBM whose PowerPC-based server hardware had already been featured in Acorn's SchoolServer product running Windows NT. In the context of such a relationship, the possibility was raised of "bolting a RISC OS 'personality' on top of a low level IBM-developed operating system" to address RISC OS's deficiencies and to support virtual memory and long filenames. At this time, IBM was pursuing its Workplace OS strategy which emphasised a common operating system foundation supporting different system personalities.

=== PC emulation ===
In mid-1991, the PC Emulator was eventually updated to work as a multitasking application on the RISC OS desktop, requiring 2 MB of RAM to do so, and supporting access to DOS files from the RISC OS desktop filer interface. The emulator itself permitted access to CD-ROM devices and ran MS-DOS 3.3 with a special mouse driver to permit the host machine's mouse to behave like a Microsoft bus mouse. CGA, EGA, MDA and partial VGA graphics support was implemented, and the emulated system could run Windows 3. The product cost £99, with an upgrade costing £29 for users of previous versions. Although technically compatible with 1 MB systems, and with 2 MB of RAM considered necessary for multitasking operation, offering facilities to capture the emulated display as a bitmap or as text, 4 MB was recommended to take advantage of such features, along with a high resolution multiscan monitor and VIDC enhancer to be able to display most of the emulated screen without needing to scroll its contents. An ARM3 processor was considered essential for "a workable turn of speed", this giving performance comparable with a 4.77 MHz 8086 PC-XT system.

Regarded as a "programming wonder", the PC Emulator was nevertheless regarded as being "too slow for intensive PC use". Shortly after the introduction of the updated PC Emulator, a hardware PC compatibility solution was announced by Aleph One, offering a 20 MHz 80386SX processor and VGA display capability, effectively delivering Acorn's envisaged PC podule in updated form. A low-cost alternative to Acorn's PC Emulator called FasterPC became available in 1993, priced at around £20 but with DOS not included (to be provided by the user at an estimated additional cost of £50). The software provided PC emulation outside the desktop environment, with considerable performance benefits claimed relative to Acorn's product. Regarded as being "considerably faster than the Acorn emulator when displaying graphics", with a two-times speed improvement observed for various tested programs, the product was considered appropriate for gaming, albeit at lower than VGA resolution. It was also unable to run Windows 3.1: the Aleph One PC expansion cards being the only solutions able to do so at that time.

=== Bitmap image editing ===
Having considerably improved graphical capabilities compared to those provided with Acorn's 8-bit machines, a number of art packages were released for the Archimedes to exploit this particular area of opportunity, albeit rather cautiously at first. One of the first available packages, Clares' Artisan, supported image editing at the high resolution of 640 × 256 but only in the 16-colour mode 12, despite the availability of the 256-colour mode 15 as standard. Favourably received as being "streets ahead" of art software on the BBC Micro, it was considered as barely the start of any real exploitation of the machine's potential. Typical of software of the era, only months after the launch of the machine, Artisan provided its own graphical interface and, continuing the tradition of BBC Micro software, took over the machine entirely even to the point of editing the machine configuration and restoring it upon exiting. Clares released a successor, Artisan 2, two years later to provide compatibility with RISC OS, replacing special-purpose printer support with use of the system's printer drivers, but not making the software a desktop application. The program's user interface deficiencies were regarded as less forgivable with the availability of a common desktop interface that would have addressed such problems and made the program "easier to use and a more powerful program as a result".

Clares also produced a 256-colour package called ProArtisan, also with its own special user interface (despite the impending arrival of RISC OS), costing considerably more than its predecessor (£170, compared to £40 for Artisan), offering a wider range of tools than Artisan including sprays, washes and path editing (using Bézier curves) to define areas of the canvas. Although regarded as powerful, the pricing was considered rather high from the perspective of those more familiar with the 8-bit software market, and the user interface was regarded as "only just bearable". Competitors to ProArtisan during 1989 included Art Nouveau from Computer Assisted Learning and Atelier from Minerva. Both of these programs, like ProArtisan, ran in full-screen mode outside the desktop, used the 256-colour mode 15, and offered their own interfaces. Atelier, however, was able to multi-task, providing the ability to switch back to the desktop and find applications still running and accessible. Unlike other contemporary art programs, it also took advantage of the system's own anti-aliased fonts. One unusual feature was the ability to wrap areas of the canvas around solid objects. Both programs also offered similar path editing facilities to ProArtisan, with it being noted that Art Nouveau's limitations in this regard might be remedied by using the support already present in RISC OS and provided by the Draw application functionality, as ProArtisan 2 eventually demonstrated.

In 1989, RISC OS was provided with the Paint application on one of the accompanying application discs. It featured a multi-document, desktop-based interface with a range of elementary painting and drawing tools, also allowing images to be created in arbitrary sizes for any of the display modes, even permitting editing of images in display modes with different numbers of colours, albeit with limitations in the representation of image colours when the desktop mode had fewer colours available. Along with its companion applications, Paint supported the system's anti-aliased fonts and printer driver framework, and by embracing the system's user interface conventions, images could be exported directly to applications such as Draw by dragging an image's file icon from the save dialogue directly to the target application.

Despite a trend of gradual adoption of desktop functionality, in 1990, Arcol from ExpLAN offered a single-tasking, full-screen, 256-colour editing experience using the lower resolution 320 × 256 mode 13, supporting only bitmap fonts. Aimed at educational users, its strengths apparently included real-time transformation of canvas areas, rapid zooming, and the absence of limitations on tools when zooming: arguably demonstrating more a limitation of contemporary packages with their own peculiar interfaces. ExpLAN subsequently released Arcol Desktop, although the "desktop" label only indicated that the program would multi-task with desktop applications and offer some desktop functionality, particularly for the loading and saving of images: the program still employed a special full-screen user interface, albeit allowing other 256-colour modes to be used, with the 320 × 256 mode of the original being the default. With expectations having evolved with regard to user interfaces and desktop compatibility, this updated product was judged less favourably, with the partitioning of functionality between the desktop and painting interface being "awkward" and the behavioural differences "confusing", leaving the product looking "rather dated" when compared to its modern contemporaries.

In early 1991, in the context of remarks that, at that point in time, the Paint application bundled with RISC OS was "the only true Risc OS art program" operating in the desktop and not restricting users to specific display modes, Longman Logotron released Revelation, an application running in the desktop environment, providing interoperability with other applications through support for the platform's standard Sprite and Drawfile formats, with vector graphics import being provided by a companion tool, and utilising the system's printing framework. Apart from observations of limited functionality in some areas, one significant limitation reminiscent of earlier products was the inability to change display mode without affecting the picture being edited. This limitation was not convincingly removed in the second version, sold as Revelation 2 around a year later, with colours being redefined when selecting a 16-colour display mode while editing a 256-colour image, preserving the inability to edit 256-colour images in 16-colour modes. A further version update was delivered as the Revelation ImagePro product, being considered "the best art package that I have used on the Archimedes" by Acorn User's graphics columnist in late 1992.

In response to the evolving competitive situation and market expectations, Clares released ProArtisan 2, a successor to its earlier product, in late 1993 as "a completely new program" with some familiar features from the company's earlier products but offering display mode independence, 24-bit colour support (including support for ColourCard and G8/G16 graphics cards), multi-document editing, and desktop compliance. The path editing tools familiar from its predecessor were supported using functionality from Acorn's Draw application, and the image enhancement capabilities had also "undergone a major revamp". At a reduced price of £135, and with use of the RISC OS desktop contributing to overall ease of use, the package was considered by one reviewer as "the best art package around at the moment for the Archimedes".

Late in the Archimedes era, this being prior to the release of the Risc PC, a consensus amongst some reviewers formed in recommending Revelation ImagePro and ProArtisan 2 as the most capable bitmap-based art packages on the platform, with Arcol Desktop and First Paint also being reviewer favourites. With the release of the Risc PC and A7000, offering improved hardware capabilities and built-in support for 24-bit colour, the art package market changed significantly. New packages supplanted older ones as recommendations, some from new entrants within the broader Acorn market (Spacetech's Photodesk, Pineapple Software's Studio24), others coming from established vendors (Clares' ProArt24 and Longman Logotron's The Big Picture), and still others from beyond the Acorn market (Digital Arts' Picture). However, the platform and hardware requirements of such packages were generally beyond Archimedes era machines, demanding 8 MB of RAM or 24-bit colour display modes (using 2 MB of dedicated video RAM) in some cases. A notable exception was Studio24 which, having been significantly updated in its second version, was reportedly "completely compatible" with the earlier machines.

=== Vector image editing ===
RISC OS was supplied with the Draw application, offering a range of tools for creating diagrams and pictures using vector graphics primitives, also permitting the incorporation of bitmap images and text into documents, and managing the different elements of documents as a hierarchy of objects. A significant capability provided by the application (and exploited by art packages) was that of Bézier curve editing, allowing shapes with smooth curves to be created, rendered and printed.

The file format used by Draw was documented and extensible, and a range of tools emerged to manipulate Draw files for such purposes as distorting or transforming images or objects within images. Amongst them was the Draw+ (or DrawPlus) application which defined other object types and also added other editing features, such as support for multiple levels or layers in documents. DrawPlus became available in 1991 and was released "at nominal cost" via public domain and shareware channels. The author of DrawPlus, Jonathan Marten, subsequently developed an application called Vector, released by an educational software publisher, 4Mation, in early 1992. (Note: A more recent development by the same author is the DrawView application based on the portable Qt graphical user interface toolkit.) Described as "effectively an enhanced Draw", the program improved on Draw's text handling by allowing editing of imported text, continued DrawPlus's support for layers and object libraries, provided efficient handling of replicated or repeated objects, and introduced masks that acted as "windows" onto other objects. Priced at £100, even for site-wide usage, the software was considered "ideal... for technical drawing, to graphic design and even limited desktop publishing". A version of Draw was also developed for Microsoft Windows by Oak Solutions.

A significant introduction to the Archimedes' software portfolio came with the release of ArtWorks by Computer Concepts in late 1992. Described in one preview as "perhaps the easiest to use, but most advanced graphic illustration package, on any personal computer today", ArtWorks provided an object-based editing paradigm reminiscent of Draw, refining the user interface, and augmenting the basic functionality with additional tools. A notable improvement over Draw was the introduction of graduated fills, permitting smooth gradients of colour within shapes, employing dithering to simulate a larger colour palette. The image rendering engine was also a distinguishing feature, offering different levels of rendering detail, with the highest level introducing anti-aliasing for individual lines. Aimed at professional use, and complementing its sibling product, the Impression desktop publishing application, 24-bit colour depths and different colour models were supported. A key selling point of the package was its rendering speed, with it being reported that redraw speeds were up to five times faster in ArtWorks on an ARM3-based machine than those experienced with CorelDRAW running on a 486-based IBM PC-compatible system. ArtWorks would have broader significance as predecessor to the Xara Studio application and subsequent Windows-based products.

=== Document processing and productivity ===
Although document processing and productivity or office software applications were addressed by a few packages released in the Arthur era of the Archimedes, bringing titles such as First Word Plus, Logistix, and PipeDream, it was not until the availability of RISC OS that the Archimedes would see the more compelling software developed for the platform being delivered, with Acorn even delaying its own Desktop Publisher to take advantage of this substantial upgrade to the operating system.

Alongside Acorn Desktop Publisher, Computer Concepts' "document processor" Impression and Beebug's Ovation provided a small selection of solutions in the realm of desktop publishing. Acorn pursued the publishing industry with software and hardware system bundles, with Impression typically featuring prominently, even in the era of the Archimedes' successor, the Risc PC. Ovation was eventually succeeded by Ovation Pro in 1996, offering stronger competition to Impression Publisher—itself the professional package in the range that had developed from Impression—and to industry-favoured applications such as QuarkXPress.

Amongst a variety of word processor applications, one enduring product family for the platform was developed by Icon Technology who had already released a word processor, MacAuthor, for the Apple Macintosh. This existing product was ported to RISC OS and released as EasiWriter in 1991, fully supporting the outline fonts and printing architecture of the host system. Icon followed up to EasiWriter with an enhanced version ("EasiWriter's big brother") in 1992, TechWriter, featuring mathematical formula editing. Both products were upgraded to provide mail-merge capabilities—a noted deficiency of the first release of EasiWriter—and both provided convenient table editing, with TechWriter also offering automatic footnote handling, being promoted as "a complete package for producing academic and technical documents". Upgraded "Professional" editions of EasiWriter and TechWriter were released in 1995, with the latter adding the notable feature of being able to save documents in TeX format.

Given the platform's presence in education, various educational word processing and publishing applications were available. Longman Logotron supplied a "cost-effective introduction to DTP" in the form of FirstPage, retailing at £49 plus VAT with "unlimited" educational site licences costing up to £190. Targeting machines with only 1 MB of RAM, various traditional word processing features such as a spelling checker and integrated help were omitted, but as a frame-based document processor it was considered "excellent value for money" when compared to the pricing and capabilities of some of its competitors, even appealing to the home market. Similarly, Softease's "object-based" document processor, Textease, also had potential appeal beyond the educational market, freeing the user from having to design page layouts using frames, instead permitting them to click and type at the desired position or to drag and drop graphical objects directly into the page, providing a user interface paradigm reminiscent of the Draw application provided with RISC OS. Document layout capabilities were nevertheless available, supporting multiple column layouts, as were the traditional features such as spellchecking and integrated help absent from FirstPage. Pricing was even more competitive at around £30, or £40 with spellchecking support.

Aside from the hybrid word processor and spreadsheet application, PipeDream, being released in versions 3 and 4 for the RISC OS desktop environment, Colton Software released a standalone word processor, Wordz, in 1993, with plans for companion applications and a degree of integration between them. The first of these companion applications was Resultz, and the two applications were combined to make Fireworkz, itself incorporating the editing capabilities of both applications within a single interface, offering the ability to combine textual and spreadsheet data on the same page within documents. Colton subsequently expanded the family in 1995 with the Recordz database product, combining it with the existing Fireworkz functionality to make the Fireworkz Pro product, this bringing it into direct competition with Acorn's Advance and Minerva's Desktop Office suites, but ostensibly offering a much deeper level of integration than those competitors. PipeDream itself was later updated to version 4.5, conforming more closely to the RISC OS look and feel, being initially offered as an upgrade for users of version 4.0.

Acorn's own interest in developing applications led it to initiate work on the Schema spreadsheet application, only to disengage from application development and to transfer the product to Clares who, with assistance from the originally commissioned developers, brought the product to market. Despite its origins as one component in an application suite that was never delivered as envisaged, a cut-down version of Schema 2 was later incorporated into Acorn's Advance application suite alongside variants of Computer Concepts' Impression Junior and Iota Software's DataPower. Schema 2 itself was enhanced with a "powerful macro language" and released in 1994.

In the spreadsheet category, Longman Logotron's Eureka, released in 1992, provided robust competition to Schema and PipeDream, seeking to emulate Microsoft Excel in terms of functionality and user interface conventions. The interoperability benefits of the updated product, Eureka 2, were later given as a reason for Acorn to adopt the software internally, acquiring a 300-user site licence and thus allowing its employees to convert "substantial spreadsheet data which needed converting from Lotus 1-2-3". Updated again as Eureka 3, with new features remedying "what was badly missing in the earlier version", but with the manual regarded as inadequate and with online help still absent from the application, the application was nevertheless regarded as the most powerful of the platform's principal spreadsheet offerings, attempting to be "the Excel of the Acorn world".

A number of database applications were made available for the Archimedes, with Minerva Software following up from its early applications on the system, DeltaBase and System Delta Plus, with the RISC OS desktop-compliant Multistore in early 1990: a relational database with a graphical "record card" interface and report generation functionality. A broadly similar approach, albeit without any claimed "relational" capabilities, was offered by Digital Services' Squirrel database manager software, emphasising customisation of the presentation of data and reporting, but also introducing a flowchart-based method of querying, this feature causing one reviewer to regard the product as "the most innovative database manager on the Archimedes" with its usability being comparable to FileMaker on the Apple Macintosh.

Aimed at the education market, with a focus more on "computerised data handling" than data management, Longman Logotron's PinPoint framed the structuring and retention of data around a questionnaire format, with a form editor offering "DTP-style facilities", and with data entry performed interactively via the on-screen questionnaire. Some analysis and graphing capabilities were also provided. A version of PinPoint would eventually be made available for Windows, ostensibly aimed at market research as opposed to education, as its producer attempted to broaden its audience and availability for different platforms. Also emphasising a desktop publishing style of presentation was Iota Software's DataPower, employing these facilities to customise record entry to "make data collection as much like form-filling as possible" and in the reporting functionality of the software.

In 1993, Longman Logotron introduced S-Base, a programmable database offering the possibility of customised database application development. Described as "a more disciplined, less graphical approach to database design", the software enforced a degree of discipline around data type and table definition, but it also retained various graphical techniques to design forms for interaction with the database. Building on such foundations, programs could be written in a language called S to handle user interaction, graphical user interface events, and to interact with data in the database. Being compared to the contemporary DOS-based Paradox software, it was regarded as having more of an emphasis on "database applications" than actual databases, also being considered as similar to the contemporary RISC OS application, Archway, as a kind of "application generator" tool.

DataPower, S-Base and Squirrel were all subsequently upgraded, S-Base 2 being enhanced with features to simplify the setting up of applications and consequently being regarded as "without doubt the most powerful database management system available for the Archimedes" due to its programmable nature, Squirrel 2 gaining relational capabilities and being recommended for its "amazing flexibility" and for its searching and sorting functionality, with DataPower being recommended more for "the majority of users" for its usability and "attractive graphs and reports".

Despite spreadsheet and database applications offering graphing capabilities, dedicated applications were also available to produce a wider range of graphs and charts. Amongst these were Chartwell from Risc Developments and the Graphbox and Graphbox Professional packages from Minerva Software. Arriving somewhat later than these packages, being released by Clares in January 1994, Plot also sought to cater for mathematical and educational users by offering support for function plotting, this having been largely ignored by the existing packages which tended "to be based on producing bar and pie charts from tables of figures".

=== Full-motion video ===
With the introduction of CD-ROM and the broader adoption of multimedia, Acorn announced a full-motion video system called Acorn Replay in early 1992, supporting simultaneous audio and video at up to 25 frames per second in the RISC OS desktop or in "a low resolution full screen mode". Unlike certain other full-motion video technologies, Replay offered the ability to read compressed video data from mass storage in real time and to maintain a constant frame rate, all on standard computing hardware without the need for dedicated video decoding hardware. The compression techniques employed by Replay reportedly offered "compression factors of between 25 and 40" on the source video data, with the software decompression requiring a computer with 2 MB of RAM or more.

Given a slower access medium such as CD-ROM or floppy disk, video could be played back at up to 12.5 frames per second, with up to 25 frames per second from a hard disk. One 800 KB floppy disk could reportedly hold 12 seconds of video. In the introductory phase of the technology, support for Replay files was quickly introduced into hypermedia applications such as Genesis and Magpie, with software developers being the primary audience for the creation of content, largely due to the expense of the equipment required to capture and store large volumes of video data. Software developers would engage the services of a suitably equipped company to convert source material to digital form, with the Replay software then used to process the video frame by frame, employing image compression techniques and "a form of Delta compression", ultimately producing a movie file.

Acorn's introduction of Replay prompted comparisons with Apple's QuickTime system which was already broadly available to users of Macintosh systems. Replay's advantages included the efficiency of the solution on existing hardware, with even an entry-level A3000 upgraded to 2 MB of RAM being able to handle 2 MB of data per second to achieve the advertised 12.5 frames per second playback. In contrast, a Macintosh system with 2 MB of RAM was reportedly unable to sustain smooth video playback, although audio playback was unaffected by the dropped video frames, whereas a 4 MB system could achieve 15 frames per second from a CD-ROM drive, although such a system was more expensive than Acorn's ARM3-based systems that could more readily achieve higher frame rates. QuickTime was also reported as only able to play video smoothly at 1/16th of the size of the screen, also favouring 32,000 colour display modes that were available on Macintosh systems with 68020 or faster processors. One disadvantage of Replay on the Acorn systems was the limitation of playback to 256 colours imposed by the built-in video system.

Educational software and resources providers saw the potential of Replay to deliver interactive video at a more affordable price than existing Laservision content, although it was noted that, at that time, Laservision still provided "the best quality, full-screen, moving image to date". Opportunities were perceived for making compilations of video clips available on CD-ROM for multimedia authoring purposes, although educational developers felt that the true value of the technology would be realised by making video like other forms of information, permitting its use in different contexts and works and thus offering children "control over the media". Educators also looked forward to more accessible authoring possibilities, with children being able to record, edit and incorporate their own video into their projects. However, the expense associated with handling video data, with the storage of one minute of video estimated at 60 MB, combined with the expense of commercial video digitisation, estimated at £100 per minute of video, meant that such possibilities would remain inaccessible for most users at that time. Indications that this situation would change were present in the QuickTime market, with it already supporting the creation of short movies in conjunction with video digitiser cards and editing tools such as Adobe Premiere.

Support for video authoring on the desktop emerged in 1993 with the Replay DIY product from Irlam Instruments: a single-width podule suitable for A540 and A5000 computers with 2 MB of RAM or more, these being the only models available at the time with the necessary performance. The podule accepted analogue video input from video cameras, recorders and laserdisc players, allowing the video to be previewed in a window on the desktop. While recording, no preview would be shown, and the hardware would digitise the audio and video input, transfer the data to the computer's memory, and this would then be sent straight to a hard disk. At its introduction, the video quality was limited to "normal Arm2 Replay, that is 256-colour, 160x128 pixels at 12.5 frames per second", although an upgrade to capture 25 frames per second was anticipated. Uncompressed video occupied around 21 MB per minute, but processing of such video using the provided Acorn Replay compression software would bring the size of the resulting video down to around 4 or 5 MB per minute. Compression was, however, relatively slow, since the compression scheme was asymmetric, meaning that decompression was fast enough to facilitate playback in real time, but compression could take "a few minutes for every few seconds of video". Nevertheless, the possibilities of video capture were predicted to "generate and maintain immense interest in the classroom, or even at home", and the digitiser's low cost (at £250 plus VAT) together with low-cost editing software such as Uniqueway's Empire (at £50 plus VAT) was regarded as surprising, possibly in light of the high cost of services previously needed to achieve similar results.

Further developments in the video authoring domain were brought to the platform by Eidos, who had developed an "offline non-linear editing system" around the Archimedes in 1989, involving the digitisation of source video and its storage on hard disks or magneto-optical media for use with editing software. Such software would be used to produce an "edit schedule list" based on editing operations performed on the digitised, "offline" video, and these editing details would subsequently be applied in an "online" editing session involving the source video, this typically residing on "linear" media such as tape. To support the more convenient offline editing environment, a highly efficient symmetric compression scheme known as ESCaPE (Eidos Software Compression and Playback Engine) had been devised, offering movie sizes of around 1.5 MB per minute. To remedy the time-consuming process of using Acorn's Replay compression software with the Replay DIY product, this being a consequence of the "Moving Lines" compression scheme emphasised by Replay at that time, Eidos introduced its own compression software for Replay DIY based on ESCaPE and given the same name. Together with the Eidoscope software, based on Eidos' professional Optima software, it was claimed that "no other computer platform has anything to match in terms of convenience and sheer usability" and that these developments would "encourage a lot more Archimedes users to have a go at making movies". In 1995, Computer Concepts offered a bundle featuring Eidoscope and the company's Eagle M2 "multimedia card" which featured audio and video capture, improved audio playback, and MIDI ports. Aimed at non-professional applications, Eidoscope was limited to editing movies up to a resolution of 160 × 128 and did not support time codes.

=== Development tools ===
With the introduction of the Archimedes, Acorn continued the practice established for its earlier machines of offering languages in addition to BASIC, albeit priced somewhat higher than the earlier implementations, these including Pascal, C, Prolog, Fortran and Lisp. Other vendors produced implementations of Forth, such as Silicon Vision's RiscForth, and Logo, such as Logotron Logo. Other Acornsoft languages such as BCPL and COMAL were not ported to the new platform and had to be run under emulation. A Smalltalk-80 implementation was also made available by Smalltalk Express costing £620, offering the familiar window-based environment, but requiring a 4 MB machine and a hard drive.

==== BASIC ====
Acorn had always emphasised its implementation of BBC BASIC in its earlier machines, and the Archimedes was delivered with an enhanced version, BASIC V, that provided additional control-flow structures such as while loops, case statements, and multi-line if statements. Graphics primitives and operations were also accessible via special-case keywords such as ELLIPSE, CIRCLE, RECTANGLE and FILL, and the specification of colours was extended to access the broader colour palette supported by the hardware. Various commands were also added for sprite plotting and manipulation and to enable, confine, disable and read the position and state of the mouse pointer. Assembly language support was included, as it had been in the BASIC provided by Acorn's 8-bit models, with the language updated to describe instructions for the ARM processor instead of the 6502 (or other processor families) familiar from the earlier machines. Access to operating system functionality was provided from BASIC, with some of the demonstration programs provided with the Arthur operating system employing the font and window manager operating system modules, (Note: Pountain mistakenly identified the three-dimensional "Lander" game as being written in BASIC, which was not the case.) including the rudimentary desktop environment.

The arrival of RISC OS brought the possibility of developing desktop, or WIMP, applications in BASIC and other languages. Being available as standard, BASIC was a natural choice for many developers of desktop applications, although "the complexity of the Wimp" and the need to defer to operating system functionality described in the RISC OS Programmer's Reference Manual, this consisting of "a staggering 52 Wimp calls", required some mitigation by tutorials seeking to guide programmers through the mechanisms and techniques involved. To ease the development of such applications, various products offering toolkits or libraries were announced, one of the earliest being Archway, this providing tools to define different aspects of an application, including window layout design and menu editing, along with BASIC library routines. More ambitious attempts were later made to extend BASIC to access desktop functionality. For instance, HelixBasic added extra keywords to BASIC V whilst also making it possible for traditional BASIC programs, including graphical programs, to run in the window-based environment transparently and concurrently.

Although the performance of the supplied BASIC interpreter had been regarded as competitive, various BASIC compilers were produced for the system, such as Dabs Press' Archimedes Basic Compiler (ABC) and Silicon Vision's RiscBASIC. Both products focused on improving the performance of the input programs, but Silicon Vision subsequently introduced a separate product, WimpGEN, as an accessory for desktop application developers. This product provided window and menu editors that would generate BASIC source code implementing the functionality required to support operation in the desktop environment. Specific application functionality would then be added, and the resulting program could also be compiled using RiscBASIC before being run.

BBC BASIC on the Archimedes was considered as a vehicle for cross-platform game development by David Braben and other developers before the Archimedes was released, Braben being the author of the three-dimensional Lander game supplied with the machine. Since the BBC Micro had been used as a development host for the Commodore 64 version of Elite and reportedly by Commodore to assist Amiga development "in the early days", a similar role was anticipated for the Archimedes in game development, this role also having the potential to expose games developers for established platforms (such as the Amiga, Atari ST, and the Sega and Nintendo consoles) to the Acorn machine. The ability to cross-assemble code in the BASIC assembler for processors other than the ARM was devised, and support from key individuals at Acorn was secured, but the company's management were reluctant to incorporate support for other systems in its product, thus curtailing the effort.

==== C ====
Despite the use of BASIC and ARM assembly language by some software houses, notably at Computer Concepts whose developers regarded the ARM processor as having been "designed to be programmed in Assembler" and where Impression and ArtWorks were implemented in ARM assembly language using the BASIC assembler, the use of higher-level languages such as C became increasingly desirable for productivity and portability reasons. That Acorn had been in a position to offer its own C compiler was reportedly the consequence of "a stroke of luck": this product having been originally developed by Arthur Norman and Alan Mycroft for a mainframe at Cambridge University and subsequently offered to Acorn.

Acorn's original C compiler and assembler products were superseded by its Desktop C and Desktop Assembler products in mid-1991. These products comprised Acorn's Desktop Development Environment, aiming to reduce the time and effort involved in developing applications and modules along with supporting such activities in the desktop environment itself. Both products provided an enhanced version of Edit known as SrcEdit for source code editing that supported "throwback": navigation to locations in source code produced by other tools such as the C compiler. The Desktop Debugging Tool (DDT) was described as "a rather impressive line by line debugger" supporting breakpoints and watchpoints and allowing conventional application code (as opposed to modules) to be stepped through by "actually stopping the desktop", with control over this activity exercised through desktop-like windows operating separately from the actual desktop. Alongside compiler, assembler and linker tools, a build utility known as Make and supporting Makefiles was provided along with an improved version of the FormEd tool used for application window design. Desktop C cost £229 plus VAT, and Desktop Assembler cost £149 plus VAT.

==== C++ ====
Acorn's C++ strategy was the subject of a degree of criticism. Initially, the company announced the availability of AT&T's Cfront to its registered developer community, this translating C++ code for further compilation by Acorn's Desktop C product. Acorn followed up by offering a new product, replacing Desktop C, that integrated CFront 3.0 to support C and C++ compilation, albeit without support for exceptions. Feedback from developers had been negative, however, citing poor-quality code and slow compilation times, with developers apparently wanting "a true native C++ compiler with good RISC OS environment support". Despite the adoption of C++ class libraries on other platforms, Acorn chose to provide user interface component functionality using a collection of modules, known as the Toolbox, accessible at the system call level instead. Apart from a port of the GNU C++ compiler, itself requiring at least 4 MB of RAM to run, the only significant competition to Acorn's C and C++ products were the Easy C and Easy C++ products from Beebug, with the former being announced in late 1993 as a Risc Developments product costing £49 plus VAT. Priced significantly less than Acorn's compiler, Easy C provided a narrower range of tools, lacking the debugger of Acorn's product in particular, and had also not been validated as conforming to the ANSI language standard, unlike Acorn's compiler. Nevertheless, it did provide the essential compiler, assembler, linker and build tools, aiming to be "an easy to use C development system aimed at the lower end of the market". In late 1994, Beebug followed up by announcing Easy C++ in advance of the availability of Acorn's own C++ product. Easy C++ compiled C++ source code directly to ARM object code and supported both templates and exceptions. It was priced at £99 plus VAT or £49 plus VAT as an upgrade from Easy C. The product was seemingly positively received, with the developers having "achieved the target they set themselves" by delivering a native C++ compiler, although the lack of updated documentation and the need for further development to improve the product were also identified.

Ultimately, the stated lack of a suitable C++ compiler and accompanying class libraries for the platform led prominent development houses to focus on products for other platforms and to abandon plans to release new software for RISC OS. In 1994, Mark Colton of Colton Software criticised Acorn for not complementing its C compiler with "C toolbox" libraries to assist with application development, and regarded Acorn as being "at a standstill" relative to broader development tool trends such as the introduction of Visual Basic and the increasing adoption of C++ together with class libraries for application development. Charles Moir of Computer Concepts justified the development of Xara Studio, a graphics application described as effectively "ArtWorks for the PC", indicating that only the larger market for Windows software could make the necessary investment in such a sophisticated application worthwhile. Since Windows development could leverage C++ and platform-specific class libraries, Computer Concepts had expected Acorn to deliver comparable tools and resources to make the development of such software possible on the Acorn platform "to no avail". Ben Finn of Sibelius Software indicated that Sibelius 7 had been a "completely new piece of software" written in C++, in contrast to earlier versions written in assembly language, primarily due to the difficulties of implementing requested features in such a low-level language. The portability of C++ software also permitted Sibelius to be made available for the PC and Mac platforms. However, with Acorn unable to provide a suitably updated C++ development suite, the company was unable to deliver its new product on RISC OS.

=== Games ===
There are 400 commercial games for Acorn Archimedes.

Game Name	Publisher	Year
10 out of 10 - Dinosaurs	Ten Out of Ten Educational Systems	1993
10 out of 10 - Dinosaurs	Ten Out of Ten Educational Systems	1993
10 out of 10 - Driving Test	Ten Out of Ten Educational Systems	1994
10 out of 10 - Early Essentials	Ten Out of Ten Educational Systems	1993
10 out of 10 - English	Ten Out of Ten Educational Systems	1994
10 out of 10 - Essential I.T.	Ten Out of Ten Educational Systems	1996
10 out of 10 - Essential Maths	Ten Out of Ten Educational Systems	1994
10 out of 10 - Essential Science	Ten Out of Ten Educational Systems	1994
10 out of 10 - French	Ten Out of Ten Educational Systems	1993
10 out of 10 - German	Ten Out of Ten Educational Systems	1994
10 out of 10 - Junior Essentials	Ten Out of Ten Educational Systems	1993
10 out of 10 - Maths - Algebra	Ten Out of Ten Educational Systems	1993
10 out of 10 - Maths - Geometry	Ten Out of Ten Educational Systems	1995
10 out of 10 - Maths - Number	Ten Out of Ten Educational Systems	1994
10 out of 10 - Maths - Statistics	Ten Out of Ten Educational Systems	1993
10 out of 10 - Spelling & Punctuation	Ten Out of Ten Educational Systems	1994
10 out of 10 - Tables	Ten Out of Ten Educational Systems	1997
10 out of 10 - Words	Ten Out of Ten Educational Systems	1997
2067 BC	Oregan Developments	1993
3D Construction Kit	Domark	1991
Abuse	R-Comp Interactive	1998
Acheton and Kingdom of Hamil	TOPOLOGIKA	1987
Adventure Collection, The	Alpine Software	1993
Adventure Pack	Cambridge International Software	1989
Adventures classic compilation	TOPOLOGIKA	1988
Aggressor	Atomic Software	1992
Aggressor 2	Atomic Software	1994
Aggressor Macho Edition	Matt Black	1992
Air Supremacy	Superior Software	1991
Aldebaran	Evolution Trading	1993
Alerion	DABS Press	1988
AlfaXL5	Generation Design	1997
Alien Fighter	Cambridge International Software	1990
Alien Invasion	Alien Images	1990
Aliped	DABS Press	1990
All-In Boxing	Alien Images	1989
Alone In the Dark	Krisalis Software	1995
ALPS	Alpine Software	1992
Ankh: The Tales of Mystery	R-Comp Interactive	1998
Anti-Grav	Delta Software	1994
Antigrav 2	The Fourth Dimension	1997
Apocalypse	The Fourth Dimension	1990
Arc/A3000 Christmas Box, The	RTFM Software	1990
Arcade 3	Clares Micro Supplies	1988
Arcade Soccer	The Fourth Dimension	1989
Arcendium	Alien Images	1988
ArcOmnibus	Beebug	1990
ArcPinball	Shibumi Soft	1990
Arcturus	Oregan Developments	1994
Armatron	Z&Z Software	1990
Asylum	Acorn Arcade	2002
Avon and Murdac	TOPOLOGIKA	1989
Axis	TBA Software	1993
Aztecs	Sherston Software	1993
Badger Trails	Sherston Software	1993
Ballarena	Sisteme	1990
Bambuzle	Arxe Systems	1991
Battle Chess	Krisalis Software	1993
Battle Tank	Minerva	1990
Big Bang	Psycore	1995
Birds of War	The Fourth Dimension	1993
Black Angel	The Fourth Dimension	1992
Blaston	Eterna	1991
Blitz!	Arxe Systems	1991
Blood Sport	Matt Black	1993
BloodLust	The Fourth Dimension	1998
BlowPipe	Eclipse	1990
Bobby Blockhead vs The Dark Planet	Atomic Software	1991
Boogie Buggy	The Fourth Dimension	1991
Botkiller	Artex Software	1995
Botkiller2	Artex Software	1999
Bouncer	RTFM Software	1991
Break 147 & Superpool	The Fourth Dimension	2000
Brian Clough's Football Fortunes	CDS Software	1992
Brutal Horse Power	TBA Software	1997
Bubble Fair	Eterna	1991
Bug Hunter & Moondash	Minerva	1990
Bug Hunter in Space	Minerva	1990
Burn'Out	Oregan Developments	1995
Cannon Fodder	Krisalis Software	1994
Card-Mania	Cambridge International Software	1993
Carnage Inc.	The Fourth Dimension	1993
Cartoon Line part one	Eterna	1991
Casino	Minerva	1989
Cataclysm	The Fourth Dimension	1991
Caverns	Minerva	1991
Caves of ConFusion	Generation Design	1994
Champions	Krisalis Software	1992
Chaos Engine, The	R-Comp Interactive	2000
Chequered Flag	Cambridge International Software	1991
Chequered Flag Extra Circuits (expansion)	Cambridge International Software	1992
Chess3D	MicroPower	1991
Chocks Away	The Fourth Dimension	1990
Chocks Away Extra Missions (expansion)	The Fourth Dimension	1991
Chopper Force	The Fourth Dimension	1992
Chuck Rock	Krisalis Software	1991
Clix	Uffenkamp Computer Systeme	1994
Cobalt Seed, The	TBA Software	1995
Colony Rescue	Alien Images	1992
Command Ship	TBA Software	1995
Confusion	Cambridge International Software	1989
Confusion II	Cambridge International Software	1990
Conqueror	Superior Software	1988
COPS	Alpine Software	1989
Corruption	Rainbird	1989
Countdown to Doom	TOPOLOGIKA	1989
Creator 2	Alpine Software	1993
Crisis	Cambridge International Software	1990
Crystal Maze, The	Sherston Software	1993
Crystal Rainforest 2, The - Mission Control	Sherston Software	1995
Crystal Rainforest, The	Sherston Software	1992
Cyber Ape	TBA Software	1995
Cyber Chess	The Fourth Dimension	1992
CyberZone	Uffenkamp Computer Systeme	1992
Cyborg	Alpine Software	1992
Cycloids	Software 42	1993
DarkWood	Eclipse	1995
Deeva	Calderglen Computers	1990
Demon's Lair	The Fourth Dimension	1993
Descent	R-Comp Interactive	1998
Descent 2: Counterstrike (expansion)	R-Comp Interactive	2002
Descent II	R-Comp Interactive	1998
Desktop Repton	ProAction	2002
Detritus	Byte Back Computing	1995
Diggers	Millennium Interactive	1994
Dinosaur Discovery	4Mation	1993
DinoSaw	Five Star Marketing	1993
Dominate	RTFM Software	1991
Doom Trilogy	R-Comp Interactive	1998
Doom+	R-Comp Interactive	1998
DragonBall	TBA Software	1993
Dreadnaughts	Turcan Research Systems	1992
Dreadnoughts - Bismark (expansion)	Turcan Research Systems	1992
Dreadnoughts - Ironclad (expansion)	Turcan Research Systems	1992
Drifter	The Fourth Dimension	1997
Drop Ship	The Fourth Dimension	1990
Dune II	Eclipse	1995
Dungeon, The	The Fourth Dimension	1993
Ego: Repton 4	Superior Software	1992
Elite	Hybrid Technology	1991
Elite Gold Edition	Hybrid Technology	1991
Emotions - Search for Humanity	The Datafile	1997
Empire Soccer 94	Empire Software	1995
Enter The Realm	The Fourth Dimension	1991
Enthar Seven	Robico Software	1988
Entropy	Oregan Developments	1993
E-Numix	Cambridge International Software	1993
E-Type	The Fourth Dimension	1989
E-Type Extra 100 Miles (expansion)	The Fourth Dimension	1990
E-Type II	The Fourth Dimension	1994
Exodus	Artex Software	1997
Exotic Adventures of Sylvia Layne, The	The Fourth Dimension	1993
Explore with Flossy the Frog	4Mation	1993
F.R.E.D.	Software 42	1993
Family Favourites	Minerva	1989
Farmonopoly	Cambridge International Software	1994
Fast 'n' Loose	Pirate Software	1990
Fat Controller	Shibumi Soft	1990
Fervour	Clares Micro Supplies	1992
Final Doom	R-Comp Interactive	1999
Fine Racer	Eterna	1991
Fire & Ice	Warner Interactive Entertainment	1995
Fireball	Go-dax	1988
Fireball II	Cambridge International Software	1990
Fish!	Rainbird	1988
Fist Lore	ICS	1996
Flashback	U.S. Gold	1994
Flight Sim Toolkit	Simis	1992
Flying High	The Datafile	1997
Formula Two Thousand	TBA Software	1994
Frak!	R-Comp Interactive	1998
Freddy's Folly	Minerva	1988
Fugative's Quest	Robico Software	1989
Galactic Dan	The Fourth Dimension	1992
Games Hyperpack	Cambridge International Software	1989
Games Minipack Five	Cambridge International Software	1990
Games Minipack Four	Cambridge International Software	1989
Games Minipack One	Cambridge International Software	1989
Games Minipack Three	Cambridge International Software	1989
Games Minipack Two	Cambridge International Software	1989
Giant Killer	TOPOLOGIKA	1990
Global Effect	Eclipse	1995
Gods	Krisalis Software	1992
Gold Run, The	Generation Design	1998
Granny's Garden	4Mation	
Gribbly's Day Out	Coin-Age	1992
Grievous Bodily 'ARM	The Fourth Dimension	1992
Groundhog	The Fourth Dimension	1998
Guild of Thieves, The	Rainbird	1987
Guile	Dream	1992
Haunted House	The Fourth Dimension	1993
Heimdall	Krisalis Software	1993
Herewith the Clues	CRL	1990
HeroQuest	Krisalis Software	1991
Heroes of Might and Magic 2: The Price of Loyalty	R-Comp Interactive	2000
Heroes of Might and Magic 2: The Succession Wars	R-Comp Interactive	2000
High Risc Racing	Modus Software	1995
High-Noon	Uffenkamp Computer Systeme	
Holed Out!!	The Fourth Dimension	1989
Holed Out!! Extra Courses Volume 1 (expansion)	The Fourth Dimension	1989
Holed Out!! Extra Courses Volume 2 (expansion)	The Fourth Dimension	1989
Hostages	Superior Software	1990
Hoverbod	Minerva	1988
Humanoids and Robotix	Cambridge International Software	1993
Ibix the Viking	Minerva	1989
Inertia	The Fourth Dimension	1990
Interdictor	Clares Micro Supplies	1989
Interdictor II	Clares Micro Supplies	1990
International 3D-Golf	Q Soft	1991
Iron Lord	Cygnus Software	1990
Ixion	Software 42	1992
Jahangir Khan World Championship Squash	Krisalis Software	1991
James Pond	Krisalis Software	1990
James Pond II Robocod	Eclipse	1993
James Pond II+ Robocod	Eclipse	1995
James Pond Underwater Agent and Running Water	SkillsWare	1995
Jet Fighter	Minerva	1988
Jigsaw	4Mation	
Jinxter	Rainbird	1989
Kaptain Konflict	Calderglen Computers	1990
Karma - The Flight Traine	Periscope Software	1992
KerBang!	Eterna	1991
Killerbugs	Cambridge International Software	1993
Labyrinth	Acornsoft	2000
Land Sea and Air	UK Software	1996
Last Cybermoch, The	Generation Design	1996
Last Days of Doom, The	TOPOLOGIKA	1990
Last Ninja, The	Superior Software	1992
Last Offence	Modus Software	1997
Leeds United	CDS Software	1993
Legend of the Lost Temple, The	Eterna	1992
Lemmings	Krisalis Software	1991
Lemmings 2: The Tribes	Krisalis Software	1994
Letrouve	Superior Software	1993
Logic Mania	The Fourth Dimension	1996
Loopz	Audiogenic Software	1991
Lotus Turbo Challenge 2	Krisalis Software	1992
Mad Professor Mariarti	Krisalis Software	1990
Maddingly Hall	Minerva	1989
Magic Pockets	Renegade	1993
Magnetoids	Oregan Developments	1994
Mah-Jong Patience	Cambridge International Software	1990
Man at Arms	The Fourth Dimension	1990
Manchester United	Krisalis Software	1990
Manchester United Europe	Krisalis Software	1991
Master Break	Superior Software	1990
Memory Magic	Cambridge International Software	1990
MetalFighters 4000	The Datafile	1997
MicroDrive	Cambridge International Software	1990
MicroDrive Extra Courses U.S.A. (expansion)	Cambridge International Software	1991
MicroDrive World Edition (expansion)	Cambridge International Software	1991
MiG-29 Fulcrum	Domark	1991
MiG-29M Super Fulcrum	Domark	1991
Minotaur	Minerva	1987
Mirror Image and Merp	TBA Software	1996
Missile Control	Minerva	1988
Money Chaser	Uffenkamp Computer Systeme	1994
Morph	The Fourth Dimension	1998
Mr Doo	Image Systems	1992
My World 2: Castles	Northwest SEMEREC	1993
Myth of Moby, The	TOPOLOGIKA	1989
Nautilus	Uffenkamp Computer Systeme	1993
Nebulus	Krisalis Software	1992
Nevryon	The Fourth Dimension	1990
Nevryon and Technodream Uncovered	ProAction	2000
No Excuses	Arcana Software	1991
Oh No! More Lemmings	Krisalis Software	1992
Olympics, The	The Fourth Dimension	1990
Omar Sharif's Bridge	Krisalis Software	1992
Orion	Minerva	1988
Overload	Clares Micro Supplies	1989
Pac-mania	Grandslam Entertainments	1989
Pandora's Box	The Fourth Dimension	1991
Paradroid 2000	Coin-Age	1993
Pawn, The	Rainbird	1990
Pesky Muskrats	Coin-Age	1992
Pharaoh's Secret Tombs, The	Generation Design	1996
Pipe Mania	Krisalis Software	1989
Plague Planet	Alpine Software	1988
Poizone	Eterna	1991
PON!	RTFM Software	1990
Populous	Krisalis Software	1992
PowerBand	The Fourth Dimension	1990
Premier Manager	Gremlin Graphics	1994
Provocator	Computer Tutorial Services	1991
Psycho Squadron	TBA Software	1993
Pushy	The Fourth Dimension	1997
Put It!	Uffenkamp Computer Systeme	1991
Puzzle Games Collection	The Fourth Dimension	
Pysanki	The Fourth Dimension	1990
Quad	Trax Software	1993
Quake Resurrection	R-Comp Interactive	2000
Quark	Oregan Developments	1993
Quazer	Impact Software	1988
Quest For Gold	Krisalis Software	1992
Quizmaster	GamesWare	1994
Race, The	Uffenkamp Computer Systeme	
Racer	Cambridge International Software	
Ravenskull	ProAction	1997
Raw Power	Software 42	1993
Real McCoy 2, The	The Fourth Dimension	1991
Real McCoy 3, The	The Fourth Dimension	1992
Real McCoy 4, The	The Fourth Dimension	1993
Real McCoy 5, The	The Fourth Dimension	1996
Real McCoy 6, The	The Fourth Dimension	1998
Real McCoy, The	The Fourth Dimension	1990
Redshift	Minerva	1990
Rekall	RTFM Software	1990
Repton 1	ProAction	1997
Repton 2	ProAction	1997
Repton 3	Superior Software	1988
Return to Doom	TOPOLOGIKA	1989
Revelation!	Krisalis Software	1992
Revolver	Psycore	1995
Rick Dangerous	The Hitmen Software	1995
Rise in Crime	Robico Software	1988
Robocatch	Generation Design	1994
Rockfall	Eterna	1991
Romans	Anglia Multimedia	1996
Rotor	Arcana Software	1989
S.W.I.V.	Krisalis Software	1992
Saddam's Revenge	MAPS	
Sally and Wally	Oregan Developments	1995
Saloon Cars	The Fourth Dimension	1991
Saloon Cars Deluxe	The Fourth Dimension	1992
Saloon Cars Deluxe Extra Courses Vol. 1 (expansion)	The Fourth Dimension	1992
Scrabble	U.S. Gold	1994
SeaTrek	Generation Design	1996
Siege	Shibumi Soft	1990
Sensible Soccer	Renegade	1993
Serpents	Cambridge International Software	1993
Shovy 3D	The Fourth Dimension	1999
Shuggy	Werewolf Software	1997
Silver Ball	The Fourth Dimension	1997
SimCity	Krisalis Software	1993
SimCity 2000	Krisalis Software	1994
Simon the Sorcerer	GamesWare	1994
Slappit	RTFM Software	1990
Small	Virgo Software	1993
Speech!	Superior Software	1991
SpeedBall 2	Krisalis Software	1994
Spheres of Chaos	Matt Black	1992
Spheres of Chaos 2	R-Comp Interactive	2000
Spobbleoid	Cybernation Entertainment Systems	1994
Spobbleoid Fantasy	Cybernation Entertainment Systems	1994
Sporting Triangles	CDS Software	1990
SpySnatcher	TOPOLOGIKA	1992
Square Route	ComputerEyes	1991
Star Fighter 3000	Fednet Software	1994
Starch	Alien Images	1990
StarTrader	GEM Electronics	1989
Stranded!	Robico Software	1989
Stunt Racer 2000	The Fourth Dimension	1993
Stunt Racer 2000 Extra Tracks (expansion)	The Fourth Dimension	1994
Super Snail	The Fourth Dimension	1998
Superior Golf	Superior Software	1990
Syndicate+	R-Comp Interactive	1998
T.A.N.K.S.	Werewolf Software	1996
Table Aliens	Sherston Software	1996
Tactic	Eterna	1990
Talisman	Minerva	1989
Technodream	Superior Software	1993
TEK 1608	R-Comp Interactive	2002
Terramex	Grandslam Entertainments	1988
Thundermonk	Minerva	1989
Time Detectives	Sherston Software	1994
Time Machine, The	The Fourth Dimension	1994
Top Banana	Hex	1991
Touch Games 1	Brilliant Computing	1991
Tower of Babel	Cygnus Software	1991
Towers of Darkness	R-Comp Interactive	
Triumvirate I, Das	Uffenkamp Computer Systeme	1991
Triumvirate II, Das	Uffenkamp Computer Systeme	1991
Trivial Pursuit	Domark	1989
Trix	Uffenkamp Computer Systeme	
Twinworld	Cygnus Software	1990
UIM	The Fourth Dimension	1990
Virtual Golf	The Fourth Dimension	1993
Virtual Golf Augusta Course	The Fourth Dimension	1993
Waterloo	Turcan Research Systems	1992
WaveLength	GamesWare	1994
White Magic	The Fourth Dimension	1989
White Magic 2	The Fourth Dimension	1989
Wimp Game, The	The Fourth Dimension	1990
Wizard Apprentice	The Datafile	1997
Wolfenstein 3D	Powerslave Software	1994
WolfPack	Software 42	1992
Wonderland	Virgin Mastertronic	1991
Word Up Word Down	GEM Electronics	1989
World Championship Boxing Manager	Krisalis Software	1991
World Class Leaderboard	Krisalis Software	1988
WorldScape	Eclipse	1990
Xenon 2: Megablast	Eclipse	1993
X-Fire	The Fourth Dimension	1992
X-Run	XFM Software	1990
Zalaga	ProAction	1996
Zarch	Superior Software	1987
Zelanites	MicroPower	1991
Zodiac	GamesWare	1994
Zool	Gremlin Graphics	1993

== Hardware ==
=== Graphical capabilities ===
The Archimedes machines (and their equivalents running RISC iX) used the VIDC1a video chip to provide a wide variety of screen resolutions, expanding on those available on the BBC Micro, including the following:

Resolution	Colours	Notes
160 × 256	4, 16, 256	
320 × 256	2, 4, 16, 256	
640 × 256	2, 4, 16, 256	
640 × 512	2, 4, 16, 256	Multisync monitor required

Since the video controller would not support display modes smaller than 20 KB, the lowest resolution modes were supported in the operating system by employing modes with twice the horizontal resolution and duplicating horizontally adjacent pixels. (Note: The claimed 20 KB limitation is actually a consequence of the minimum pixel clock frequency supported by the VIDC of 8 MHz, together with the typical display frequencies of supported monitors, notably the horizontal sync frequency of 15 kHz, and the colour depths of the defined modes.)

The introduction of RISC OS brought support for a number of new display modes including the following:

Resolution	Colours	Notes
640 × 480	2, 4, 16, 256	Multisync or 60 Hz VGA-type monitor required
1056 × 256	16, 256	132-column modes

The A540 and A5000 supported additional display modes:

Resolution	Colours
800 × 600	2, 4, 16

High-resolution monochrome display modes were offered by the A440, A400/1 series and A540:

Resolution	Mode	Availability
1280 × 976	22	A440 running the Arthur operating system, this mode being dropped from RISC OS
1152 × 864	23	A440 running Arthur, A400/1 series running RISC OS, A540 (Note: Given as 1152 × 900 for A400/1 series and A540)

Apparent confusion about monochrome monitor support upon the launch of the Archimedes models led Acorn to clarify that the A400 series had "extra circuitry" offering two additional display modes "of up to 1280 by 976 in monochrome, and 160 columns by 122 lines of text, but only using a special monitor", this being connected using two BNC sockets (one for signal and one for sync).

The A540 (and corresponding R-series workstations) offered three BNC sockets, adding one for a separate horizontal sync connection for certain monitors. Acorn suggested the 19-inch Taxan Viking and Philips M19P114 monitors, with the former being offered in a bundle with the R140 workstation. The Taxan Viking R140 product bundled the existing Viking product with appropriate cabling and produced a "rock steady" 66 Hz mode 23 display, albeit with mouse pointer corruption at the extreme right of the screen due to "a bug in the VIDC chip".

The A5000 unlike its predecessor, the A540, did not support high resolution monochrome modes.

==== Graphics expansions ====
An expansion to speed up the VIDC chip in the Archimedes from 24 MHz to 36 MHz was announced by Atomwide in 1990, offering higher-resolution display modes for machines connected to multisync monitors. Although resolutions up to 1280 × 480 and 1024 × 640 were supported, flicker due to a decreased refresh rate was reported as a problem, with 1152 × 486 appearing to be more comfortable in this regard. The SVGA resolution of 800 × 600 was also supported in up to 16 colours. One side-effect of increasing the frequency of the VIDC was to also increase the frequency of generated sounds, since the VIDC was also responsible for sound generation. VIDC enhancers were supplied by some monitor vendors together with the appropriate cable for Archimedes machines, although fitting the device still required approved service work to be performed. Monitors such as the Taxan 795 Multivision were only usable in multisync modes without the VIDC enhancer whose accompanying software sought to "redefine all modes" to be compatible with the display as well as providing new modes.

One drawback of VIDC enhancer solutions was the increased memory bandwidth used by the VIDC at its newly elevated frequency, slowing down machines when using higher resolution modes, particularly machines with ARM2 processors and slower memory busses. Consequently, other solutions were adopted to work around the limitations of the built-in display hardware, notably "graphics enhancers" such as the PCATS graphics enhancer from The Serial Port, and "colour cards" such as Computer Concepts' ColourCard and State Machine's G8 which provided a separate framebuffer, holding a copy of the normal screen memory, for use in generating a video signal independently of the system's main memory. This permitted higher refresh rates (up to 70 Hz) even for higher resolution modes, although the maximum size of the screen memory imposed by the VIDC (480 KB) also imposed a limit on available resolutions and colour depths, with 800 × 600 being the highest-resolution 256 colour mode that could be supported. However, such cards were also able to support more flexible palettes in 256 colour modes than the VIDC, and for lower resolutions, greater colour depths offering over 32,000 colours could be supported. The ColourCard was reported to allow an ARM2 system to use a 1600 × 600 display mode with 16 colours (occupying 480 KB) with an operating speed of "160% of the speed of the considerably lower resolution Acorn mode 28", this being 640 × 480 with 256 colours (occupying 300 KB).

State Machine, founded by former hardware designers from Computer Concepts and Watford Electronics, announced a range of colour card peripherals, starting with the G8 and G8+ in late 1992, followed by the G8 Professional, these cards being demonstrated at the BBC Acorn User show in 1992, as was the Computer Concepts ColourCard. One potentially significant difference between the different product ranges was the role of the VIDC, with the ColourCard employing a "video switch" that permitted the VIDC to generate an output signal independent of the card for traditional display modes, with the card only generating output for enhanced modes, whereas the State Machine cards were entirely responsible for output and thereby provided emulations of the traditional modes, this leading to a "letter-box" effect for some modes in early versions of the State Machine software and also causing compatibility issues with software, particularly games, that accessed VIDC registers directly to configure the display. Subsequent developments from State Machine brought the G16 card, offering application-specific support for 15 and 16 bits per pixel modes.

Alongside bandwidth constraints, a fundamental limitation to the size of VIDC framebuffers was imposed by the memory controller, limiting the size of framebuffers transferred to the VIDC through DMA to a specific 512 KB physical memory region. State Machine's ColourBurst card, announced together with its G16 card, employed memory mapping techniques to provide 1 MB of video RAM instead of the 512 KB of earlier cards and thus supporting larger screen modes. The ColourBurst was, when reviewed in late 1993, the first 24-bit colour card available for the Archimedes, also supporting various upgrades including the "video switch" capability absent from earlier cards, PAL encoding, and other professional capabilities.

Coincidentally, ARM Limited announced the VIDC20—the successor to the VIDC10 in the Archimedes—at around the same time as the introduction of the Computer Concepts and State Machine product ranges in late 1992. By late 1993, rumours about Acorn's next-generation system (eventually released as the Risc PC), particularly 24-bit colour support, led to suggestions of improved support for higher colour depths in RISC OS, accompanied by the observation in the context of State Machine's ColourBurst card that "it seems unlikely that another manufacturer will release such a powerful device before the launch of Acorn's new baby". In late 1993, Computer Concepts announced the ColourCard Gold, developed in conjunction with Acorn to offer 15 bits per pixel support in the desktop environment. Meanwhile, State Machine announced the ClusterCard for 33 MHz A5000 models, plugging into the memory controller socket and supporting upgrades to 8 MB of RAM alongside graphics enhancements offering 1 MB or 2 MB of video RAM. The ClusterCard, employing the G335 Cluster Module was reported to be the first graphics card for the Archimedes series not requiring the use of the VIDC.

With IBM PC compatible systems leaving the Archimedes "well behind the competition in the display stakes", the ClusterCard was seen as attempting a solution similar to a local bus architecture on the A5000, with the potential to "transform the A5000 into a serious graphics machine, with possibly as good a display potential as the next Acorn series equipped with VIDC20s". The launch of the Risc PC in 1994 demonstrated Acorn's successor to the Archimedes, to which State Machine responded with a product called ColourView, "an all-new replacement for the original G8 and G16 State Machine graphics cards", offering 16 bits per pixel desktop-compatible screen modes, with a modular version also available for the ClusterCard without the 1 MB framebuffer. The full version of the card was reportedly available for A300 series, A400 series, A5000 and A540 machines.

Somewhat distinct from general graphics enhancements, various products were also introduced to support the broadcasting industry and other professional imaging applications. In late 1990, Millipede Electronic Graphics announced an imaging product called APEX (Archimedes P3 Expansion) featuring "four P3 (pixel pipeline processor) chips, together with an Arm3 processor running at 27 MHz". With support for "broadcast quality graphics at 32 bits per pixel", hardware support for windows and sprites, emphasising real-time image combination and manipulation, the product was aimed at professional users and priced accordingly, with the version providing 4 MB of RAM projected to cost £2750. Nevertheless, a licensing agreement had been reached with Acorn to "enable Risc OS graphics functions to be fully emulated". Following up from this earlier product, Millipede offered an "all new Apex Imager" video card in early 1994 featuring the four custom chips, ARM3, FPA, and 16 MB of video RAM on a double-width podule costing £3975, this being virtually unchanged from the pricing of the original product from 1990. This product appears to make extensive use of FPGA devices and offers numerous video input and output facilities. Apex hardware was used by the Eidos video capture and compression solution, Thumper, which ran on a Risc PC and was able to process "MPEG 1 resolution video at full PAL frame rate in real time", being regarded in early 1995 as "the best digitiser for our needs on any platform" by Eidos' managing director. Previous Eidos capture solutions used A540 machines with 8 MB of RAM.

=== Sound and audio ===
The Archimedes was capable of producing eight-channel, 8-bit, stereo sound, with the video controller chip being responsible for sound generation, it having direct memory access capabilities to independently stream audio data to the output circuitry. Some users sought to bypass the audio filtering circuitry to improve sound from the external audio connector.

=== Floating-point arithmetic ===
The Archimedes did not provide hardware support for floating-point arithmetic as standard, but the system was designed so that one might be added, with a floating-point co-processor instruction set architecture having been defined by Acorn for programs to use. As part of the system architecture, a software module provides an emulation of such a co-processor, handling floating-point instructions unsupported in hardware using software written using conventional ARM instructions. The co-processor was described as a "cut-down" ARM with only eight registers available instead of sixteen, offering instructions to transfer values to and from memory (supporting single, double, extended double and packed binary-coded decimal representations), to transfer values between the main CPU and co-processor, to transfer status information from the co-processor, to perform unary and binary operations on values, and to perform comparisons.

In the first generation of Archimedes 300 and 400 series machines, only the 400 series had the appropriate expansion capability to add a floating-point unit (FPU) or co-processor, although the emulator was supported on all models. The expansion capability was retained in the 400/1 series. The FPU expansion card was delivered for the R140 workstation and 400 series in 1989, priced at £599 plus VAT, and was based on the WE32206, with a "protocol converter chip" being used to translate between the ARM and the WE32206. The WE32206 card was also offered for Acorn's Springboard expansion card for IBM PC compatibles. Although Acorn had expected that interfacing the ARM to an existing FPU chip would be "a much quicker route" to delivering a hardware-based floating-point solution than developing a new co-processor, the complexity involved in developing the custom gate array responsible for interfacing to the WE32206 was apparently greater than anticipated, taking two years to deliver.

Reviews of the FPU were generally unenthusiastic, noting that Acorn's claims of an eight-fold speed-up were unlikely to be achieved in "a practical program", nevertheless reporting that programs performing repeated floating-point operations yielded speed-ups ranging from around four to sixteen times that of a base ARM2-based system. Somewhat more applied testing demonstrated speed-ups for benchmark programs of up to eight times, aligning with Acorn's claims, but contrasted these gains with the broader performance increases attainable from an ARM3 upgrade, these offering a more general four-fold speed improvement. Largely focusing on BASIC programming, one reviewer concluded that the FPU was "all but obsolete" with the availability of the ARM3 upgrade. Another conceded that some but not all C programs would benefit from the FPU since "a good programmer will avoid using floating point instructions if at all possible", suggesting that Acorn's R140 workstation would benefit more from the upgrade. However, BASIC programs compiled using the Archimedes BASIC Compiler achieved over nine-fold speed-ups for certain benchmarks, unlike those running on the standard BASIC interpreter whose floating-point routines avoided using FPU instructions, thus delivering no real performance improvements with the FPU fitted.

The Archimedes models based on the ARM3 processor supported a completely new "arithmetic co-processor" or "floating-point accelerator" known as the FPA. Released in 1993 for the R260 workstation and the A540 and A5000 machines, priced at £99 plus VAT, the FPA device—known specifically as the FPA10—was fitted in a dedicated socket on the processor card for the R260 and A540, or in a motherboard socket in the A5000. It offered a peak throughput of 5 MFLOPS at 26 MHz. The models officially supporting the FPA had been introduced some time prior to availability of the device, and various ARM3 upgrade cards for earlier models had also been made available with an FPA socket in anticipation of eventual availability. Fabrication of the device was performed by GEC Plessey Semiconductors and was reported to be in "an advanced stage of production" in early 1993. Availability remained unclear, with ARM releasing technical details indicating that the chip, at 134,000 transistors was reportedly "Arm's most complex IC to date" and comparing its performance at "around 4 MFLOPS" to the MIPS R3010 floating-point co-processor, whilst claiming a substantial power consumption advantage. Further details were given upon the eventual release of the FPA10, stating a 26 MHz operating frequency and a power consumption of 250 mW. Reception from major software producers such as Computer Concepts and Colton Software was cautious, with the former's products not making any use of floating-point instructions and thus not standing to benefit, and with the latter's using such instructions but indicating skepticism about any significant benefits in performance.

Observations from testing the FPA10 confirmed that applications such as Resultz and PipeDream 4—both Colton Software products—and other spreadsheets, whilst ostensibly standing to benefit as number processing applications, exhibited "no noticeable speed improvements", this being attributed to these applications' avoidance of unnecessary calculation and the more significant overhead of servicing a graphical user interface. Other programs such as Draw and ArtWorks—a Computer Concepts product—used their own arithmetic routines instead of the floating-point emulator (FPE) and, as anticipated, were therefore unable to take advantage of the accelerated floating-point instructions. However, various free of charge or low-cost programs ported from other systems, such as POV-Ray, plus selected native applications such as Clares' Illusionist and Oak Solutions' WorraCAD, did exhibit substantial performance gains from the FPA with speed-ups of between five and ten times. Programs compiled by Intelligent Interfaces' Fortran compiler were reported as running "some routines up to 20 times faster with the FPA10". Although the FPA10 only implemented arithmetic operations, delegating trigonometric operations to the FPE, it was able to operate concurrently with the main CPU and maintained its own instruction pipeline, allowing the CPU to proceed with other instructions until a floating-point instruction result was required. Speculative execution was also employed to improve performance.

Observed BASIC program performance remained in line with experiences from the earlier FPU solution. The BASIC VI (or Basic64) interpreter bundled with RISC OS which was "much slower than Basic V normally", with the former using the FPE and the latter providing its own floating-point arithmetic routines, ended up "slightly faster" than BASIC V due to observed speed-ups of around four to around eleven times, with non-trigonometric operations benefiting the most in one analysis. Another analysis employing benchmarks of individual arithmetic and trigonometric operations indicated a more uniform distribution of performance improvements for BASIC VI programs, also noting that BASIC VI delivered more precision than BASIC V in its floating-point representation. The product was perceived as "good value" but having restricted usefulness with the general lack of support in many applications, these employing their own routines and techniques to attempt to provide performant arithmetic on the base hardware platform, and a lack of incentive amongst software producers to offer support without a large enough market of users having the FPA fitted.

With the FPA10 having finally become available but only rated to run at 26 MHz, and with ARM3 upgrades being delivered at frequencies as high as 35 MHz, a higher-rated part, the FPA11, supporting 33 MHz operation was developed and apparently delivered in products such as a processor card upgrade for the A540. ARM3 upgrades were also produced with 33 MHz ARM3 processors, but unlike their 25 MHz counterparts which were available with FPA10 co-processors already fitted, these faster cards were not supplied with FPA11 co-processors, perhaps due to availability issues with the faster part.

=== ARM3 upgrades ===
In early 1990, Aleph One introduced an upgrade board for Archimedes A300 and A400 series models featuring the ARM3 processor which had been designed by Acorn but was sold independently by VLSI Technology. Although the ARM2 employed by current models could reportedly be run at 20 MHz, it was only ever run at 8 MHz due to external limitations, these being the speed of the data bus and of the "relatively slow", but correspondingly relatively inexpensive, RAM devices in use. The ARM3 incorporated a 4 KB on-chip combined instruction and data cache, loosening such external constraints and thus permitting the processor to be run productively at the elevated 20 MHz frequency. With a processor running at this higher speed, the overall performance of a computer with the ARM3 upgrade was reported as double that of the machine without the upgrade ("on average, execution times were halved"), with programs performing input/output benefiting rather less ("a worst case of 30 percent improvement"). Original A300 and A400 series models, as opposed to the A400/1 series, required an upgrade to MEMC1a. One hundred percent compatibility with the ARM2 was claimed, and a facility was provided to disable the on-chip cache and to slow the clock to 8 MHz in order to handle software that ran too fast with the ARM3 running at full speed, but as originally provided, the ARM3 was not compatible with the existing hardware floating point co-processor solution due to the introduction of a different co-processor interface in the device, this interface eventually being used by the FPA device. The upgrade was introduced at a price of £684.24, with the MEMC1a costing £57.50 for those users who needed it.

By the end of 1991, an ARM3 upgrade had been offered for the A3000 by Aleph One in association with Atomwide and by Watford Electronics. Since the ARM2 was soldered directly to the motherboard in the A3000 using surface mounting techniques, the upgrade had to be performed by a fitting service, and prices included courier collection, fitting, testing and return within five working days. With the A5000 having been launched with a 25 MHz ARM3 fitted, these A3000 upgrade boards carried a processor running at this higher frequency relative to earlier upgrades. Originally, the Aleph One product had been priced at £468.83, but the announcement of a board by Watford Electronics led to a reduced price of £392.45. The Watford product had an introductory price of £274.95.

Other vendors produced ARM3 upgrades. In late 1992, Simtec Electronics announced a board with an additional socket for the FPA device, thus allowing older machines to join the A540 and A5000 in potentially taking advantage of it. By this time, prices for ARM3 upgrades had been reduced to the point that this Simtec upgrade cost only £175 plus VAT. Competitors including IFEL and CJE Micros followed Simtec's lead and announced similar combined ARM3/FPA upgrades. In contrast, Aleph One stated that the FPA would "not be available for a long time yet", indicating the pursuit of "a better solution based on the newer Arm600 chip plus an FPA". Other vendors had apparently ruled out similar ARM600-based products on the basis of cost. In 1993, IFEL later announced a 35 MHz ARM3 upgrade based on a limited quantity—approximately 1500—of available suitably rated parts, these having a ceramic package whose volume ruled out its use in machines with limited internal space, making the upgrade suitable for A300, A400 or R140 machines. A combined ARM3/FPA upgrade with the faster ARM3 was under consideration, although the lack of suitably rated FPA chips meant that a switch would be provided to manually change the clock frequency between 25 MHz and 35 MHz. A target price of £199 including VAT was estimated.

Prior to the availability of the FPA, Simtec reduced the price of its combined ARM3/FPA board to £165 plus VAT. The company also released a "turbo RAM" upgrade for ARM250-based machines to provide similar performance benefits to an ARM3 upgrade, replacing the RAM with a faster type that then permitted the processor to be run at a higher frequency, thus pursuing the alternative approach to enhancing system performance (increasing both the processor and memory speed) to that pursued by ARM3 upgrades (introducing a faster processor with a cache). With the upgrade, performance of these machines was reported as increasing from 7 MIPS to 10 MIPS, this compared to almost 13 MIPS for a 25 MHz ARM3. By employing a 16 MHz clock signal, as envisaged by Acorn in the design of the A3010, in conjunction with dynamic RAM devices with a 70 ns access time, the upgrade provided a total of 4 MB of RAM and a 40 percent performance improvement. Unlike standard RAM upgrades, the turbo upgrade needed to be fitted at a suitable facility, and the board was priced slightly higher than a standard RAM upgrade at £129 plus VAT. A "super turbo" version of the board with 20 MHz crystal and 45 ns dynamic RAM devices was reviewed and apparently available subject to component availability, reportedly achieving 12.25 MIPS.

Aleph One, having founded the ARM3 upgrade industry, found that increased competition from "six or eight companies making Arm3 upgrades" drove down prices to the point that "margins fell, and the bottom fell out of the Arm3 market". However, revenues from ARM3 upgrades allowed Aleph One to pursue the development of IBM PC-compatible podule expansions and eventually the PC processor card for the Risc PC, these having "a higher intellectual content than Arm3 upgrades" and being more difficult for potential competitors to make. Plans were indicated to develop a PowerPC processor card for the Risc PC. Neither the PowerPC upgrade for the Risc PC nor the earlier ARM600-based upgrade for the Archimedes series appeared, with Acorn itself abandoning plans to combine newer ARM600 or ARM700 parts with FPA devices to provide improved floating point performance.

ARM3 upgrades were produced for several years, but with the ARM3 part being "officially discontinued" by its manufacturer VLSI in 1996, upgrade vendors such as IFEL were predicting scarcity and unable to guarantee further supplies of such products. Demand for such upgrades, even in 1996, was reported as "steady" with schools still upgrading "batches of old A300 and A400 machines". Later still, in 1997, Simtec announced a "special batch" of ARM3 upgrades for A300 and A400 series machines and the A3000, featuring a socket for the 25 MHz FPA10 or 33 MHz FPA11, with the former being supplied already fitted for a total product cost of £199 plus VAT.

=== IBM PC-compatible podules ===
Acorn initially planned to produce an IBM PC-compatible system on a podule (peripheral module), complete with 80186 processor (running at 10 MHz) and disk drive support. Subsequent pricing and competitiveness considerations led to the product being shelved. However, in late 1991, hardware supplier Aleph One announced a PC podule based on a 20 MHz Intel 80386SX processor with VGA display capability. Launched in early 1992, the podule fitted with 1 MB of RAM cost £595, whereas a 4 MB version cost £725. Known as the 386PC, the expansion was "in effect, a PC within your Archimedes" whose RAM could be upgraded from the minimum of 1 MB, the price of this configuration having fallen to £495 at the time of its review, to the maximum of 4 MB, with this configuration also being offered at a reduced price of £625. A socket on the board permitted the 80387 maths co-processor to be fitted for hardware floating point arithmetic support, this costing an extra £120. Integration of the PC system involved the Archimedes providing display, keyboard and disk support. In the initial version, the supplied 386PC application would put the Archimedes into dedicated display mode and thus take over the display, but subsequent versions promised operation of the PC in a window, much like the updated PC Emulator from the era. Screen memory requirements were around 256 KB for MDA and CGA, with EGA and VGA requiring another 256 KB. Separate serial and parallel ports were fitted on the expansion board due to limitations with the ports on existing Archimedes machines, but integration with those ports was also planned for subsequent versions of the product.

Watford Electronics, in association with "prolific ex-Computer Concepts hardware expert" Chris Honey, announced a PC podule in early 1992, this effectively delivering "a stand-alone PC" within the host computer and potentially allowing two independent users with their own keyboards and monitors, although the PC system would be accessible via a desktop window and have access to RISC OS hard drive partitions. This product was apparently never released, however, and its designers subsequently formed graphics expansion producer State Machine. In late 1992, Aleph One reduced the price of the 386-based card by £100, also upgrading the processor to a 25 MHz part, and introduced a card featuring a 25 MHz Cyrix 486SLC processor, with the new card retaining the maths co-processor option of the earlier product. The stated performance of this new card was approximately twice that of the 386-based card but only "40 percent of the performance of a standard 33 MHz 486DX PC clone". However, upgraded Windows drivers reportedly allowed even the 386-based card to exceed the graphical performance of such a 486-based clone, effectively employing the host Archimedes as a kind of "Windows accelerator". A subsequent review moderated such claims somewhat, indicating a Windows performance "not noticeably better than an average un-accelerated 386SX PC clone", although acceleration support was expected to improve, with device drivers for various direct drive laser printers also expected. The product was priced at £495 for the 1 MB version and £595 for the 4 MB version, with a future revision of the product anticipated that would support up to 16 MB of RAM.

In 1993, Aleph One collaborated with Acorn to produce Acorn-branded versions of the PC cards for use with the A3020 and A4000 which used a distinct "mini-podule expansion system". The 25 MHz 386SX and 486SLC cards were offered in this profile to provide DOS and Windows compatibility, branded as the PC386 and PC486, priced at £275 and £499 respectively. In late 1993, the supplied software was upgraded and discounts to the products announced, bringing the respective prices down to £225 and £425. Acorn also offered bundles of the A4000 with a hard drive and each of the cards. Coincidentally at this time, with speculation building about future Acorn computer products, Acorn's product marketing manager had been reported as suggesting that such products "would have an empty Intel socket for customers to add PC Dos and Windows compatibility". Such remarks were clarified by Acorn's technical director, indicating that an Intel "second processor" was merely an option in an architecture supporting multiple processors. Ultimately, Acorn would release the Risc PC with dual processor capabilities and support for using a "low cost (£99 upwards) plug-in 486 PC processor or other CPUs" alongside an ARM processor.

Redesigned PC cards were released in 1994, introducing the option of a faster 50 MHz 486SLC2 processor for a reported doubling of the performance over the fastest existing cards. Up to 16 MB of SIMM-profile RAM could be fitted, and a local hard drive controller was added. The supplied software was also upgraded to support Windows in a resolution of 800 × 600 at up to 16 colours, and optional network driver support was available to use the card as a Novell NetWare client and for Windows for Workgroups 3.11. Pricing remained similar to earlier models. Reported performance was better than the previous generation of cards but "still slow compared to all but the most basic of modern PCs, but certainly usable". The Windows User benchmarks rated the performance as similar to a fast 386SX-based system or a "standard" 386DX-based system, with the faster processor yielding a more favourable rating, but with the hard drive and graphics tests bringing the overall rating down. Use of a hard drive fitted directly to the card, using its own dedicated IDE interface, was reported as providing up to ten times the level of hard drive performance relative to using the system's own drive, but use of the SmartDrive caching software made any resulting performance difference marginal.

=== Parallel and data processing ===
A range of podules providing access to parallel processing capabilities using Inmos Transputer processors were announced by Gnome Computing in late 1989. Aside from a "Link Adaptor" podule for interfacing to external Transputer hardware, the "TRAM Motherboard" podule combined the Link Adaptor's interfacing logic with the hosting of up to four "TRAMs" (Transputer plus RAM modules), providing a complete development system based on the Archimedes. Also offered was a "Transputer Baseboard" podule featuring a T425 or T800 with up to 8 MB of RAM. A single podule with four TRAMs, each employing a T800 processor, was stated as giving 40 MIPS of performance, with a hypothetical 160 MIPS available on an Archimedes with four podule slots.

Digital signal processing capabilities were provided by the Burden Neuroscience 56001 DSP Card, originally developed by the Burden Neurological Institute as in-house hardware for use in conjunction with Archimedes systems but marketed by The Serial Port. This card was fitted as a single-width podule but, unusually, needed manual configuration instead of identifying itself to the host computer. The podule itself offered a 32 MHz Motorola 56001 digital signal processor together with 192 KB of RAM, two 16-bit analogue-to-digital converters, two 16-bit digital-to-analogue converters, and serial communications capabilities. A 25-pin connector provided the means to interface the board to other hardware. An assembler was provided, although this reportedly required Acorn's Desktop Development Environment to function, and software was also provided to interact with the board, view memory and register contents, and to visualise memory ranges in real time. Described as appropriate for "high speed analogue data acquisition or output" supporting real time signal processing, the product was considered "a useful 56001 development test bed", requiring a certain level of expertise, but was also considered good value at a price of £449 plus VAT.

=== CD-ROM and related storage ===
CD-ROM technology was introduced to the Archimedes range in 1990 with the launch of Next Technology's CD-ROM solution for the A3000 and earlier Archimedes models. Combining an SCSI interface and CD-ROM drive and supplied with a sample disc for a total price of £995, the solution provided a filing system so that standard CD-ROM media could be browsed and read like any other kind of disc. An application was also provided to play audio tracks on CD Audio and mixed-format discs through the drive's headphone socket. The drive itself used a caddy to hold the discs inserted into the drive. One limitation experienced on RISC OS was with the content on various CD-ROM titles, this often being designed for MS-DOS and featuring DOS-only software to offer search and database-related functionality. Next Technology aimed to remedy this situation by offering a service to let users create their own CD-ROMs at around £300 per disc, leading to the initial conclusion that schools and institutional users would benefit from the format much more than home users.

Two years on from the introduction of CD-ROM products, adoption of the technology was still at a "tentative state", with £8 million having been spent on equipment and an estimated 3,000 drives deployed in UK schools. Drive prices had fallen significantly, from around £1,000 to £300 and with a further decline to £200 anticipated. As a significant technology in the delivery of multimedia content, the focus had shifted from merely using CD-ROM as a cheap storage medium for large amounts of graphics and text to aspirations of providing "high-quality, full-screen graphics coupled with hi-fi stereo sound" on CD media, with the principal challenge identified as being able to deliver compressed video that either a computer or a drive could decompress without compromising video quality or introducing incompatibilities between different manufacturers' products.

Acorn's video solution for its own computers was the Replay system, introducing compression formats and associated software for playback and authoring. However, laserdisc technology, which had been used several years earlier by Acorn for interactive video applications, notably in the BBC Domesday Project, was still seen as being a "promising rival" to CD-based video formats, having finally "become successful in multimedia training" and by then "being aimed at well-heeled home video enthusiasts". Reservations about the read-only nature of CD-ROM discs was also seen as a "wounding flaw", leaving users to consider alternatives for convenient bulk storage, with magneto-optical drives emerging at this time. Nevertheless, CD-ROM adoption was seen as inevitable, particularly given the format's benefits for holding large amounts of text and making the searching of such text convenient, and with government initiatives having helped to make an estimated 100 titles available for both MS-DOS and RISC OS. The dual-function nature of the media and the ability to use drives to play audio also made such products generally attractive purchases, particularly for home users and with Photo CD also regarded as an attraction, although the introduction of Philips' CD-i and Commodore's CDTV risked a level of confusion in this market as well as presenting another challenge in terms of compatibility for Acorn's own products and technologies.

Acorn would go on to announce Photo CD support in its products in early 1993, with operating system and application enhancements being delivered by the end of that year. Although the video and memory capabilities of the Archimedes machines were generally unable to take advantage of the higher colour depths or the largest sizes of the scanned images on Photo CD media, the introduction of future hardware from Acorn, featuring the next generation of video controller from ARM and supporting 24-bit colour displays, was anticipated. Support for multi-session CD-ROMs entailed some upgrades to existing SCSI interfaces as well as the use of drives with the appropriate capabilities such as Acorn's own Multimedia Expansion Unit.

=== Networking capabilities ===
The Archimedes was launched with provision for an optional Econet module to be installed, this module being the same as that used by the Master series. Acorn introduced Ethernet connectivity with the launch of the company's R140 Unix workstation, also offering expansion cards for Archimedes models. In 1992, Atomwide also introduced Ethernet cards for the traditional Archimedes expansion bus and for the internal expansion slot in the A3000. Ethernet could be used as faster medium for existing Econet-style networking, or the TCP/IP protocol stack could be employed instead. Acorn sought to introduce Econet functionality on top of Internet protocols with its Acorn Universal Networking (AUN) suite of technologies.

Numerous vendors offered Ethernet expansion cards, such as Ant Limited (via Atomwide), Digital Services, i-cubed, Oak Solutions, and Risc Developments. Although compatible with AUN, some of the cards offered support for vendor-specific enhancements such as Oak Solutions' ClassNet and Digital Services' NetGain. Other networking approaches were available, including the sharing of hard drives using a SCSI bus, and emerging technologies such as Asynchronous Transfer Mode were deployed on the Acorn platform, notably in SJ Research's Nexus product.

=== BBC Micro interfacing and ROM software support ===
As a way of offering continuity with the BBC Micro and the user port, 1 MHz bus port and analogue port that were provided by the earlier range of machines, Acorn announced an I/O podule at the launch of the Archimedes, this being fitted with the 6522 VIA featured in the BBC range, with the possibility of upgrading the podule to provide a MIDI port. A ROM podule was also announced with the anticipation that users upgrading from the earlier machines would choose to fit their application and language ROMs in their new machine, these running under the 6502 emulator provided with the operating system.

In early 1988, Computer Concepts announced its own ROM/RAM podule that was capable of accepting seven chips, each with a maximum capacity of 128 KB, supporting the use of installed RAM as "a RAM-disc filing system" with optional battery backup to retain the contents with the machine powered down. The company also announced the availability of its existing BBC Micro productivity suite for use with the board. Acorn also released its ROM and I/O podules in the first half of 1988. Other companies also offered I/O expansions, such as the Unilab I/O Box 3000 for the A3000 that provided three user ports, analogue port and 1 MHz bus port. HCCS and Morley Electronics supplied podules for the A3000 that provided user and analogue ports, with Morley's product also offering an I2C bus connector ostensibly for the use of subsequent peripherals from the company.

== Impact ==
A mid-1987 Personal Computer World preview of the Archimedes based on the "A500 Development System" expressed enthusiasm about the computer's performance, that it "felt like the fastest computer I have ever used, by a considerable margin", indicating that the system deserved success in the education market and might have more success than Acorn's earlier models in the business market, comparing favourably to the Macintosh II or IBM PS/2 Model 80. Similar enthusiasm was reflected by the same writer in a Byte magazine preview of the A310 the following month. However, dissatisfaction with the availability of essential applications, such as the lack of a word processor specifically written for the system at its launch, and the incoherent user experience presented by early applications, highlighted perceived deficiencies with the product from the perspective of users and potential users.

Acorn had predicted sales of 20,000 Archimedes machines by the end of 1987 and 120,000 by the end of 1988. However, by mid-1988 only 14,000 units had reportedly been sold. One commentator attributed such disappointing sales to the lack of software support for the system, noting that Acorn had not invested sufficiently in software availability and that few established companies in the Acorn market were delivering native applications. Acorn's strategy of commissioning applications available for other platforms, such as First Word Plus and Logistix, was regarded as "hardly innovative" and that the platform needed "a massive injection of native, innovative software", perhaps by a revitalised Acornsoft.

With the imminent arrival of RISC OS for the Archimedes, later coverage around the start of 1989 praised the desktop and supplied applications, noting that "RISC OS is everything the Archimedes' original Desktop should have been but wasn't", and looked forward to future applications from Acorn and third parties, only lamenting that it was "a shame that this impressive environment was not in place at the Archimedes' launch, but it's still not too late for it to turn some heads". The introduction of the A3000, launched with RISC OS fitted, delivered better than expected sales for Acorn, with an estimated total of 50,000 Archimedes and A3000 systems having been sold by the end of 1989.

By early 1991, 100,000 Archimedes machines had been sold, with the A3000 being the largest selling computer in UK schools, with Acorn's Archimedes and Master 128 accounting for 53% of sales in an eight-month period during 1990, and with the 32-bit machines "outselling the Master 128 by a factor of two to one". In this period, over two-thirds of computer sales into primary schools had been Acorn models, with Acorn's 40% share of sales into secondary schools making the company the largest single vendor in this section of the market. By mid-1992, a reported 180,000 Archimedes machines had been sold, again due to strong A3000 sales. By 1994 and the launch of the Risc PC, over 300,000 Archimedes machines had been sold, and the A3000 had become the fourth best selling computer in the United Kingdom. By the launch of the StrongARM J233 variant of the Risc PC in 1997, over 600,000 systems had been shipped running RISC OS, including Archimedes, A-series and Risc PC systems.

The Archimedes was distributed to varying degrees outside the UK. Enquiries about the Archimedes range were reportedly handled for the US and Canada via Olivetti Canada, with distribution and servicing in Canada being undertaken by Comspec in association with Olivetti Canada. In Italy, the Archimedes was promoted and distributed by G. Ricordi & C., previously appointed as Acorn's exclusive distributor in the country.

=== Performance ===
Performance evolution of the Archimedes and various competitors

Acorn's original claims for the Archimedes noted a performance of 4 million instructions per second (MIPS), these reportedly being equivalent to DEC VAX-11/750 instructions. With the VAX-11/750 rated at 0.62 VAX MIPS, Acorn's claimed 4 MIPS translates crudely to around 2.5 VAX MIPS. However, the initial 8 MHz Archimedes 310 model achieved around 2.8 VAX MIPS, delivering competitive performance against more expensive contemporary personal computers such as the 16 MHz Compaq Deskpro 386 (priced from $6,499 including 40 MB hard drive), with the Compaq achieving around 2.1 VAX MIPS. (A VAX-11/780 running VAX/VMS 4.2 produced the baseline Dhrystone score of 1757 corresponding to 1 VAX MIPS, this also being used to calculate MIPS ratings for Dhrystone 2 benchmark results.)

This level of performance made the Archimedes one of the most powerful home computers available during the late 1980s and early 1990s, with its CPU outperforming the Motorola 68000 found in both the cheaper Amiga 500 and Atari ST machines as well as the more expensive Macintosh and Amiga 2000. Although an 8 MHz 68000 has a performance rating of around 1.2 VAX MIPS, the 68000-based Amiga 1000 reportedly achieved around 0.54 VAX MIPS when benchmarked as a system. In comparison, systems based on the 8 MHz ARM2, such as the BBC A3000, benchmarked from 2.7 VAX MIPS up to 3.4 VAX MIPS, depending on the operating system version and display configuration.

Performance improvements would be delivered over time for the Archimedes and its competitors. For example, the Compaq Deskpro 386/16 model was replaced in 1988 with a 386/20 model offering somewhat improved CPU performance (around 3.5 VAX MIPS) (Note: The 2.1 VAX MIPS of the 386/16 scaled by the CPU performance of the 386/20 divided by that of the 386/16 relative to the IBM PC/AT: 3.61/2.20.) and in 1989 by a 386/33 model improving CPU performance still further (to around 6.6 VAX MIPS). Upgraded Amiga models also offered steadily improving performance, with the Amiga 2500/20 appearing in 1988 and the Amiga 2500/30 appearing in 1989, these delivering approximately 1.5 VAX MIPS and 3.0 VAX MIPS respectively, with an Amiga 2000 upgraded to a 33 MHz 68030 processor achieving a performance rating of around 3.0–3.6 VAX MIPS. (Note: Approximate figures for the 2500 models are calculated by taking 0.54 VAX MIPS as representative for the Amiga 2000 and scaling it according to the relative performance given for each model's Dhrystone benchmark result in the Amiga Intuition Based Benchmark results, these being 2.80 for the A2620 (Amiga 2500/20) and 5.51 for the 25 MHz A2630 (Amiga 2500/30).) The Macintosh II series incrementally improved their performance from around 1.6 VAX MIPS in 1987 with the original 68020-based model, through to around 6.1 VAX MIPS in the 68030-based Macintosh IIfx in 1990.

The increasing performance deficit relative to the x86 architecture was somewhat reduced with the introduction of the ARM3 in 1990: an Archimedes system such as the A410/1 upgraded to use a 25 MHz ARM3 could achieve 10.5 VAX MIPS, with the ARM3-based A5000 achieving a reported 13.8 VAX MIPS, rising to 15.1 VAX MIPS in its 33 MHz variant. ARM3 upgrades were initially rather expensive but decreased significantly in price and were available for all ARM2 systems, even the relatively inexpensive A3000. Thus, Acorn's ARM3-based machines, generally priced for business or institutional users, remained broadly competitive. Acorn's low-end A3010, fitted with an ARM250 processor, was capable of delivering from 3.1 VAX MIPS up to 5.0 VAX MIPS, remaining competitive with upgraded Amiga models such as the Amiga 2500.

With development of ARM technologies having been transferred to ARM Limited as a separate company, the performance advantages of Acorn's ARM-based computers, maintained by the transition from the ARM2 to ARM3, eroded somewhat in the early 1990s relative to competitors using processors from established vendors such as Intel and Motorola, as new ARM processors gradually arrived offering more modest performance gains over their predecessors. With ARM Limited focusing on embedded applications, it was noted that "the large performance lead Arm2 and Arm3 once enjoyed" over contemporary Intel processors was over, at least for the time being.

The introduction of the 68040, and particularly the introduction of the 80486 with its subsequent evolution, put ARM3-based Archimedes models at an increasing performance disadvantage. Successors to the Macintosh II in the form of the Quadra and Centris series improved performance two- to four-fold over earlier models. An Amiga 4000 with 68040 CPU (or a suitably upgraded Amiga 2000 and 3000) could achieve a reported 18.7–21.6 VAX MIPS, whereas Compaq Deskpro 486/25 and 486/33 models achieved a reported 14.7 VAX MIPS and 19.2 VAX MIPS with 25 MHz and 33 MHz 80486 CPUs respectively, and with the introduction of 486DX2 CPUs at 50 MHz and 66 MHz during 1992 raising this to as much as around 28.5 VAX MIPS. Against such performance ratings only Acorn's Risc PC 600 (18.4 VAX MIPS to 21.8 VAX MIPS) fitted with an ARM610 CPU could keep up. However, by the time of its introduction in 1994, two years after the reported incorporation of the ARM610 in the Apple Newton, such performance had already been surpassed by Pentium-based models such as the Compaq Deskpro 5/66M Model 510 delivering 40.3 VAX MIPS.

Although the Archimedes, emulating floating-point arithmetic instructions in software, achieved Whetstone benchmark results comparable to Acorn's earlier Cambridge Co-Processor product based on the 6 MHz NS32016 CPU with NS32081 floating-point unit, such levels of performance were rather less impressive in comparison to contemporary systems equipped with hardware floating-point support, merely reaching a performance level "within a factor of two or less" of IBM PC/AT systems equipped with an 80286 CPU and 80287 floating-point co-processor. Already in 1988, a 20 MHz Compaq system with an 80386 CPU and 80387 co-processor would achieve around 1800 KWhetstones or around 20 times the performance of the ARM2 emulating floating-point instructions. Acorn's WE32206-based Floating Point Unit (FPU), available for the A400 series and R140, was expected to deliver ten-fold performance benefits, and was eventually claimed to offer eight-fold speed-ups. This left FPU-equipped systems delivering around half the performance of accelerated 386-based systems.

The claimed performance of Acorn's Floating Point Accelerator (FPA10), available for ARM3-based Archimedes systems, was originally 5 MFLOPS, subsequently revised to "around 4 MFLOPS", and may ostensibly have been broadly competitive with the MIPS R3010 (as claimed by ARM) in some systems under benchmark testing, with an A5000 fitted with FPA10 reportedly achieving around 3.5 MFLOPS, compared to various R3000/R3010-based systems achieving between 5.0 and 8.9 MFLOPS. However, unlike the R3010, announced in 1988 with claimed performance ratings of 4 MFLOPS for double-precision arithmetic and 7 MFLOPS for single-precision arithmetic, and available in workstation products the same year, the FPA10 was eventually delivered in 1993, by which time numerous subsequent MIPS products had been delivered with steadily increasing performance, diminishing the relevance of comparisons with the R3010. For example, the MIPS R4400, available from 1992, achieved over 24 MFLOPS when benchmarked in systems. In contrast with the declining competitive situation of the ARM3, the ARM3 and FPA10 combination did appear to rather more competitive with the 486DX2 systems introduced in late 1992, these rated at around 3.6–4.5 MFLOPS, but a year later these would be eclipsed by the performance of Pentium-based systems starting at 8.8 MFLOPS.

=== Education ===
Continuing Acorn's involvement with the BBC and its computer literacy initiatives, two of the first Archimedes models bore the BBC branding, as did the later BBC A3000 model. Dissatisfaction with this arrangement was voiced by competitor Research Machines and an industry group led by a Microsoft representative, the British Micro Federation, who advocated the use of "business standard" operating systems such as MS-DOS. Responding to claims that the BBC branding was "unethical" and "damaging", a BBC Enterprises representative stated that the arrangement was "a continuing part of the original computer literacy project" and that bringing in "something totally new would be irresponsible".

The range won significant market share in the education markets of the UK, Ireland, Australia, and New Zealand. Acorn's considerable presence in primary and secondary education had been established through the Archimedes' predecessors—the BBC Micro and BBC Master—with the Archimedes supplementing these earlier models to see Acorn's products collectively representing over half of the installed computers in secondary schools at the start of the 1990s.

In 1992, the Tesco supermarket chain initiated its Computers for Schools scheme in association with Acorn, offering vouchers for every £25 spent in Tesco stores that were redeemable against software and hardware products including complete computer systems, with this promotional campaign taking place over a six-week period. Over 15,000 schools registered to participate in the scheme and over 22 million vouchers were issued during the campaign period, placing the estimated value of the distributed products at over £4.5 million, although the actual value of distributed products was later reported as £3 million. Tesco and Acorn repeated the scheme in 1993 on the basis of the response to the previous year's campaign, distributing software and hardware at an estimated value of £6.5 million to over 11,000 schools including 7,000 computers, and even introducing Acorn computers to some schools for the first time.

Despite the benefit to Acorn of expanding its customer base, dissatisfaction was expressed by dealers and software companies about the effects of the scheme, with anecdotes emerging of a reluctance to buy equipment that could be obtained for free, thus harming dealer revenues, although Acorn's education marketing manager argued that the scheme's effect was generally positive and actually produced sales opportunities for dealers. The inclusion of software products in the scheme was regarded by one commentator as harmful to both the companies whose products were featured, these "not making enough profit from the transaction", and to those whose products were not, these seeing potential customers choose their competitors' "free" products. Noting that the scheme was "not purely philanthropic", concern was expressed about the effect on the Acorn market and that schools were needing to "resort to charities and publicity stunts to get the basic tools to do the job". In response to such criticism, independent software titles were dropped from the scheme in 1994, which ultimately distributed products to over 10,000 schools including 4,000 computers, with a total of 15,000 computers having been given away over the first three years of the scheme.

With Tesco having expanded its presence in Scotland through acquisitions, the Tesco scheme was extended to Scotland for the first time in 1995. Alongside updates to the featured product selection, the possibility was introduced of saving unredeemed vouchers for redemption in the 1996 campaign. By the end of the 1996 campaign, £5.7 million worth of products had been distributed, with the scheme having distributed products worth a total of £25.9 million, including 26,000 Acorn computers in its first five years.

By the mid to late 1990s, the UK educational market began to turn away from Acorn's products towards IBM PC compatibles, with Acorn and Apple establishing a joint venture, Xemplar, to market these companies' products in the education sector as part of a strategy to uphold their market share. Through Xemplar's involvement in the Computers for Schools scheme, Apple products were featured for the first time in the 1996 campaign. Xemplar's involvement continued in subsequent years, introducing information technology training for teachers in 1998, and seeking to offer Acorn products in the 1999 campaign despite the turmoil around Acorn as the company sought to move away from the desktop computing market, subsequently selling its stake in Xemplar to Apple. In 2000, Tesco changed its partner in the Computers for Schools scheme from Xemplar to RM plc.

Acorn conducted other promotional initiatives towards the education sector. The Acorn Advantage programme, launched in September 1994, offered a loyalty scheme whereby points were accrued through purchases and redeemed for "curriculum resources" that included non-computing items such as musical and scientific instruments as well as computer hardware. Several commercial partners were involved in the scheme such as Fina, which awarded vouchers with petrol purchases that could be exchanged for points, and the Midland Bank which would donate points to schools joining its Midbank school-based banking system. An Acorn-branded Visa credit card would also generate Advantage points for nominated schools.

== Legacy ==
The Archimedes was used by music composers and scorewriters to run the Sibelius scorewriting software.

Between 1994 and 2004 the Archimedes and Risc PC models were used for teleprompters at television studios. The hardware was easy to adapt for TV broadcast use and cheaper than other hardware available at the time. Archimedes models saw use in other commercial broadcasting applications including scheduling and CD jukebox control for the Asda supermarket chain's in-store satellite broadcast radio channel.

The performance and adaptability of the Archimedes range led these machines to be used in various entertainment venue applications and solutions. Tecnation's Bitbopper utilised video digitisers, genlock and MIDI cards in Archimedes 440 computers, integrating audio and video inputs under the control of a "light jockey" and producing audiovisual output via venue entertainment system installations, utilising projectors, displays and other effects equipment. Laser Grafx's Prisma system employed Archimedes 440 and A5000 machines to control laser effects installations at music concerts and nightclubs. A range of Archimedes and Risc PC models were used to control various aspects of the Quasar laser tag gaming experience, being introduced in an upgrade to the systems known as Chromaburst, itself subsequently being replaced by a more conservative solution using PC compatibles.

== See also ==
- The Fourth Dimension (company)
- RISC OS character set
- Category:Acorn Archimedes games
