= DCS =

DCS may refer to:

== Government ==
- Danish Council of State, the privy council of Denmark
- Defense Clandestine Service, a component of the U.S. Defense Intelligence Agency
- Department of Child Safety (or Services), or Child protective services, the name for an agency tasked with protecting children from violence, exploitation, abuse, and neglect
- Deputy Chief of Staff (DCS), as in:
  - Deputy Chief of the Air Staff (disambiguation)
  - Deputy Chief of the Defence Staff
  - White House Deputy Chief of Staff
- Diplomatic Courier Service, a branch of the US Bureau of Diplomatic Security tasked with protecting diplomatic pouches and material
- Directorate of Colonial Surveys, the United Kingdom's central survey and mapping organisation for British colonies and protectorates 1946–1957
- Dutch Council of State, a constitutionally-established advisory body to the government of the Netherlands

== Law enforcement ==
- Department of Corrective Services, department of New South Wales Government responsible for supervision of adult offenders on community-based or custodial orders
- Detective Chief Superintendent, the senior detective and commander of the Criminal Investigation Department in most forces in the United Kingdom
- Georgia Department of Community Supervision, the executive branch agency of the U.S. state of Georgia tasked with the supervision of felony probationers and parolees

== Education ==
- Dade Christian School, a private school in Miami-Dade County, Florida
- Dayton City School, a school district and elementary/middle school in Dayton, Tennessee
- Dean Close School
- Desert Christian Schools (Arizona), in Tucson, Arizona
- Desert Christian Schools (California), a private school in Lancaster, California
- Diploma of Collegial Studies, a certificate awarded for completion of pre-university studies in the province of Québec, Canada
- Dipolog Community School, a non-tertiary institution in Dipolog City, Philippines
- Doctors Charter School of Miami Shores, a High/Middle Charter School located in Miami Shores, Florida
- Department of Computer Science (University of Toronto)

== Medicine ==
- D-Cycloserine, a GABA transaminase inhibitor and an antibiotic
- Decompression sickness, symptoms suffered by a person exposed to a reduction in the pressure surrounding their body
- Dendritic cells, a type of antigen presenting cell of immunologic function
- Dorsal Column Stimulator, an implantable medical device used to treat chronic pain of neurologic origin
- Damage control surgery, a form of surgery which is used in cases of severe trauma
- Delusional companion syndrome, a psychological neuropathology of the self
- Diffuse correlation spectrometry, a medical imaging technique

== Technology ==
- Data Coding Scheme is a field in SMS and CB messages which carries information about message encoding
- Dark current spectroscopy, a technique used to find contaminants in silicon
- Departure control system, airline computer systems responsible for passenger and bag processing activities
- Desktop Color Separations, an enhanced EPS file format
- Device Control String, hex 90 in the C1 set of control codes
- Dichlorosilane, SiH_{2}Cl_{2}, used in microelectronic wafer processing
- Digital Cellular System, a mobile communications-based PCS network used outside of the U.S.
- Digital Command System, a model railroad system by MTH Electric Trains
- Digital Compression System, a sound system developed by Williams Electronics
- Digital cross connect system, a type of telecom equipment
- Digital-Coded Squelch, a squelch that superimposes a continuous stream of FSK digital data on the transmitted signal
- Direct Coupled System, a loosely coupled multiprocessor comprising an IBM 7040/7090 pair or a 7044/7094 pair.
- Distributed control system, a control system in which the controller elements are not central in location but are distributed throughout the system
- Dwight Cavendish Systems, a manufacturer of video copy protection
- Form D Control System, a subset of the Northeast Operating Rules Advisory Committee operating rules for railroads
- Kodak DCS, a series of professional digital single-lens reflex cameras
- Dry Combat Submersible, a military submarine being developed for use by the United States Navy

== Entertainment ==
- Dead Celebrity Status, a Canadian rap rock group
- Desi Culture Shock, a UK Bhangra group
- Digital Combat Simulator, a combat flight simulator developed by Eagle Dynamics

== Other ==
- Deacon (Church of Scotland), postnominal for a deaconess or deacon of the Church of Scotland
- Deaf Children's Society, a British charity for deaf people and their families
- Dynamic Cooking Systems, now a unit of Fisher & Paykel
