= List of desktop publishing software =

The following is a list of major desktop publishing software. For comparisons between the desktop publishing software, such as operating system or cloud support, licensing, and other features, see Comparison of desktop publishing software.

== Locally Installed Software ==
- Adobe InDesign
- Adobe FrameMaker
- Affinity
- Apache OpenOffice
- Arbortext Advanced Print Publisher
- Collabora Office Draw and Collabora Office Writer
- CorelDRAW
- InPage
- LibreOffice Draw and LibreOffice Writer
- LyX
- Microsoft Publisher
- Pages
- QuarkXPress
- Scribus
- The Print Shop

== Online/Cloud-based Software ==
- Canva
- Adobe Express
- Collabora Online Draw and Collabora Online Writer
- Marq

== Retired or Discontinued ==
- Affinity Publisher
- Aldus PageMaker
- AppleWorks
- Calamus - for Atari TOS-based computers
- Corel Ventura
- Fatpaint
- geoPublish - for the Commodore 64
- iCalamus
- Impression - for Acorn Archimedes
- iStudio Publisher
- PagePlus by Serif Europe
- PageStream
- RagTime
- Ready, Set, Go!
- Timeworks Publisher

== See also ==
- Comparison of desktop publishing software
