= InPage =

Indian word processor and page layout software

- InPage 3 splash screen displaying Urdu text
- Original author: Concept Software
- Developer: InPage Team
- Release: 1994; 32 years ago
- Stable release: 4.1 / January 2026; 10 months ago
- Operating system: Microsoft Windows, macOS
- Available in: English
- Type: Desktop publishing software
- License: Proprietary
- Website: inpage.com

InPage is a word processor and page layout software by Concept Software Pvt. Ltd., an Indian information technology company. It is used for languages such as Urdu, Arabic, Balti, Balochi, Burushaski, Pashto, Persian, Punjabi, Saraiki, Sindhi, Kashmiri and Shina under Windows and macOS. It was first developed in 1994 and is primarily used for creating pages in Urdu, using the Nasta`līq (نستعلیق) ('hanging' calligraphic) style of Arabic script.

== Overview ==
InPage is used on PCs where the user wishes to create their documents in Urdu, using the style of Nastaliq with a vast ligature library while keeping the display of characters on screen WYSIWYG. Overall, this makes the on-screen and printed results more 'faithful' to hand-written calligraphy than most other Urdu software on the market at the time of InPage's release. This faithfulness is achieved while keeping the software simple and easy-to-use, akin to earlier versions of standard English Desktop Publishing packages such as QuarkXPress and Adobe InDesign.

Before being used within InPage, the Noori style of Nastaliq, which was first created as a digital typeface (font) in 1981 through the collaboration of Mirza Ahmad Jamil TI (as calligrapher) and Monotype Imaging (formerly Monotype Corp.), suffered from two problems in the 1990s: a) its non-availability on standard platforms such as Windows or Mac, and b) the non-WYSIWYG nature of text entry, whereby the document had to be created by commands in Monotype's proprietary page description language.

History

In 1994, an Indian software development team - Concept Software Pvt. Ltd. (est. 1988 in Delhi), led by Rarendra Singh and Vijay Gupta, with the collaboration of a UK company called Multilingual Solutions led by Kamran Rouhi, developed InPage Urdu for Pakistan's newspaper industry, who up until that time had been using large teams of calligraphers to hand-write last minute corrections to text created under Monotype's proprietary system. The Noori Nastaliq typeface was licensed for InPage from Monotype and augmented for use as the main Urdu font in this software, along with 40 other non-Nastaliq fonts.

InPage is reported to be used on millions of PCs in Pakistan and India (mainly illegal pirated versions). It has also been widely marketed and sold legally in the UK and India since 1994.

InPage launched its Version 3 at ITCN exhibition Asia in Karachi, Pakistan, held in August 2008. This version is Unicode based, supports more Languages, and other Nastaliq fonts with Kasheeda have been added to it along with compatibility with OpenType Unicode fonts. In addition to Arabic, Saraiki, Urdu, Persian and Pashto, other languages of the region, such as Sindhi and Hazaragi can be handled in InPage. The latest version 4.0 launched on 6 January 2024 at NCPUL National Urdu Book Fair, Mumbai, India. This version is backwards compatible with files created with version 2.92 and up along with extra fonts and some minor fixes.

== See also ==
- Comparison of desktop publishing software
- List of desktop publishing software
