= ICalamus =

iCalamus
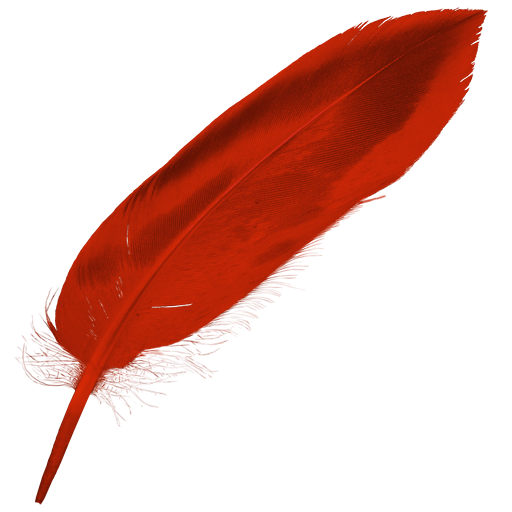
- Developer: invers Software
- Stable release: 2.2´7 / December 19, 2023; 2 years ago
- Operating system: macOS 10.11 or higher
- Available in: 12 languages
- List of languages English, Czech, Danish, Dutch, French, German, Italian, Japanese, Latvian, Polish, Spanish, Swedish
- Type: Desktop Publishing
- License: Trialware
- Website: www.lemkesoft.de/en/products/icalamus/

iCalamus is a frame-oriented layout and DTP application for macOS which has been developed by the German software company invers Software. The name iCalamus derives from the software Calamus by the same manufacturer but neither offers document compatibility nor shares a single line of source code with the latter. The name Calamus derives from the Latin word calamus, a writing instrument made of reeds.

In April 2018 iCalamus was acquired by Lemke Software, makers of GraphicConverter.

== History ==
After invers Software had marketed and maintained the DTP software Calamus for various computer platforms since 1996, at latest in 2001, after the takeover of the Calamus program rights, the question came up whether Calamus should still be maintained as a native Atari application or better be ported to Windows or Mac OS. The port was too costly and lengthy to the developers. There was the idea of a whole new layout application natively to write in Objective-C for Mac OS X. The development of iCalamus 1.0 started in November 2003 and was completed with some delay in October 2006.

iCalamus is often compared with InDesign, PageMaker and QuarkXPress in magazine reviews. Because of the similar name, it is often regarded as the new Calamus for Mac.

In March 2018, invers Software announced the cessation of its business operations and hence the distribution and development of iCalamus. In May 2018 it was announced that the GraphicConverter manufacturer Lemke Software took over iCalamus. Since then, Lemke Software has been distributing iCalamus on its own — and will further develop the program.

== Versions ==
Thanks to a special plug-in which handles print orders for photo books, calendars and other print products of the Photographerbook company, it is also possible to print photo books and calendars created in iPhoto with the free, unregistered version of iCalamus. Standard iCalamus documents can be created with some limitations in the unregistered version. The registered version's current price is 129 EUR.

Being a Universal Binary, iCalamus 1 supported Mac OS X as of 10.4.5. Version 2 was released at the end of 2013, requires (since v2.14) OS X 10.11 (El Capitan) and is a 64 bit application. The software offers twelve languages: Czech, Danish, Dutch, English, French, German, Italian, Japanese, Latvian, Polish, Spanish, Swedish. There is still no option to load Calamus SL documents directly into iCalamus.

== Features ==
iCalamus can take whole web pages as PDF screen shots into documents. Using grouped shape frames, images can be masked in real-time. Like his namesake Calamus, iCalamus supports real virtual copies of frames, where there is no mother-child relation; all virtual frames change at the same time. All layout elements can be adjusted infinitely transparent. For creating masks and textflow polygons, a Tracer engine is integrated. iCalamus supports all PDF blend modes. The print output does not convert or touch ICC profiles of imported images. iCalamus is the first DTP application to support the LinkBack protocol which allows to plug external applications like plug-ins or modules into the GUI of the software.

== See also ==
- Comparison of desktop publishing software
- List of desktop publishing software
