= PageStream =

Desktop publishing software package

- PageStream 5
- Developer: Grasshopper LLC
- Release: 1987; 39 years ago
- Stable release: 5.1.2 / September 5, 2022; 3 years ago
- Platform: Amiga, Atari ST, Linux, MorphOS, macOS, Windows
- Available in: 22 languages
- Type: desktop publishing
- Website: pagestream.org

PageStream (originally Publishing Partner) is a desktop publishing software package by Grasshopper LLC (United States) currently available for a variety of operating systems including Windows, Linux, and macOS.

== History ==
The software was originally released under the name Publishing Partner for the Atari ST by Soft-Logik Publishing Corporation of St. Louis, Missouri. The software was developed entirely by Deron Kazmaier, president of SoftLogik. It was announced in November 1986 at COMDEX/Fall in Las Vegas, Nevada, and was released to retail in early 1987. STart magazine heralded the release of Publishing Partner as the start of the desktop publishing revolution on the Atari ST.

Publishing Partner was renamed to PageStream for version 1.5, which was a significant revamp over the original. It was released for the Atari ST in early 1989; it received an Amiga port in March 1989. Version 1.8 followed in early 1990 with several new features and improved color separation abilities. Version 2.0 was released for the Amiga in 1990 and Atari ST in 1991. This version added support for PostScript fonts and, for the Amiga, AGFA Compugraphic Intellifont support.

PageStream 2.2 for Amiga and Atari ST was released in 1992. The Amiga version added support for the HotLinks Editions publish–subscribe system, which was bundled with Soft-Logik's PageLiner text editor, as well as a simple bitmap graphics editor utility, BME. These added features were absent from the Atari ST port of version 2.2 due to difficulties developing for the ST platform; although Soft-Logik planned to add these features to the ST version of PageStream at some point, the company ended up abandoning the ST entirely after version 2.2.

PageStream 3.0 for Amiga was released in 1994. The application was entirely rewritten with a new user interface and many new features. Such features included table of contents, index, nested chapters, Bézier curves, horizontal and vertical multi-page spreads, drop caps, hanging punctuation, Pantone colors, auto-kerning, auto-hyphenation, and ARexx scripting support.

In late 1995 and late 1996 PageStream 3.1 and 3.2 were released for Amiga. With the aftermath of Commodore's bankruptcy sending the Amiga platform into rapid decline, Soft-Logik found themselves at a critical juncture. In order to stave off the demise of the company, Soft-Logic pivoted to the Macintosh in mid-1996. A pre-release of PageStream version 3.1 for System 7 was made available in August 1996. Various extensions were released for PageStream including TextFX (vector text warp), Borders (vector borders for rectangles), and Gary's Effects (image processing filters).

PageStream 3.3 was released for Amiga and Macintosh in 1997 with new fly-out tools for shapes, grids, and notes, as well as RTF export, a character panel, and improved chapter support. The Macintosh version included support for AppleScript.

PageStream 4.0 was released in 1999 with added support for Windows. Linux support was added in 2004. According to the official website, the latest version is PageStream 5.1.2, released September 5, 2022.

== See also ==
- Comparison of desktop publishing software
- List of desktop publishing software
