= Impression (software) =

- Developer: Computer Concepts
- Initial release: c. 1989
- Written in: ARM assembly language (assembled using BBC BASIC's inbuilt assembler)
- Operating system: RISC OS
- Type: Desktop publishing
- License: Proprietary commercial software

Impression is a combined desktop publishing and word processor application for RISC OS systems. It was developed by Computer Concepts who described it as a "document processor" — a DTP system responsive enough to be a daily-use word processor. Initially made available in pre-release form in 1989, having been demonstrated in February 1989 at the Which? Computer Show and subsequently announced as being available from June 1989. The "completed" version was eventually delivered on 18th January 1990.

Originally, the application appears to have been developed for Acorn's then-current operating system, Arthur, as a ROM-based product, but due to dissatisfaction with the state of Arthur during early development of the application, it was then meant to use Computer Concepts' own operating system, Impulse, instead. (Publicity images for the software depict a different operating environment to RISC OS.)

== Product range and history ==
=== Impression II and Junior ===
Impression II, an improved version of the product, was released in 1990 alongside Impression Junior, a cut-down version of Impression II priced at £103, compared to the £194 price of the "senior" product. Given a degree of instability in early versions of Impression, Computer Concepts had promised a free upgrade to Impression version 1.1 to existing users. Ultimately, the further development of the software led to a more significant release incorporating several enhancements, and this Impression II release was offered as a free upgrade instead. Enhancements included improved frame selection and manipulation controls, repeating frames for headers and footers, and "instant" in-place rotation of vector and bitmap graphics. Impression II was featured in the Acorn Publishing System: a bundle featuring an Archimedes 540 computer, Impression II software, SVGA-capable monitor, 120 MB hard drive, 256-greyscale flatbed scanner (Computer Concepts' ScanLight Professional), and direct-drive Canon laser printer (Computer Concepts' LaserDirect HiRes8) for a suggested retail price of £4995 plus VAT.

Impression Junior was introduced to compete with word processors on the RISC OS platform such as Pipedream and First Word Plus, both considered "fundamentally character mode programs" with some graphical support. Certain layout features were preserved from the "senior" product such as the use of frames, but "master pages" (a form of templates) and the style mechanism were omitted (or "simplified"), emphasising traditional effect-based styling of text instead. As with Impression, documents could be printed in a form accurately portraying their on-screen appearance, making use of outline fonts and the font manager, but for rapid output the draft and near-letter quality modes of printers could be used instead. One noted omission was a convenient mailmerge function, although conventional word processing features such as automatic contents and index generation were also omitted from the product. Impression Junior was the basis of the word processor component of Acorn Advance: an integrated office suite "similar in concept to Claris Works or Microsoft Works".

Mailmerge functionality was featured in the Impression Business Supplement product, introduced in 1991 for Impression 2.10 at a price of £57.57, which also provided support for four-colour separations, the ExpressionPS tool for the processing of PostScript for typesetting purposes, and a selection of file format loaders. However, these mailmerge capabilities were regarded as somewhat inferior to that provided by the variant of Impression Junior featured in Acorn's Advance integrated office suite.

In 1997, Impression Junior was made available as a free download from Computer Concepts' Web site, having been replaced in the company's product range by Impression Style in December 1993. The download was perceived as a way of evaluating the Impression family of products for potential purchasers of Impression Style and Publisher.

=== Impression Publisher and Style ===
In 1993, Computer Concepts revamped the Impression product line, creating Impression Publisher as the successor to Impression II and Impression Style as the successor to Impression Junior. Impression Publisher added various features aimed more at professional use to the core product, such as CMYK colour separations and crop marks, alongside other enhancements. Impression Style built on feedback from existing users and on work done on Impression Junior to produce the word processor component of Acorn Advance.

Both Impression Publisher and Style supported "object linking and embedding" (OLE) and 24-bit colour, and were offered as upgrades to existing users of Impression II and Junior respectively at the same price of £29 plus VAT. Impression Publisher was also bundled with the separate Equasor and TableMate tools to take advantage of the OLE support, as was Impression Style, with the inclusion of Equasor being regarded as welcome but not as comprehensive as the mathematical typography support of Icon Technology's TechWriter (its principal competitor in this regard), and with TableMate seeking to augment the elementary table editing functionality in the Impression series, being regarded as a "delightful little utility" that was somewhat less flexible than the table support of other word processors (such as Colton Software's Wordz) but "hugely preferable" to the established, "cumbersome" construction of tables using horizontal and vertical rules.

A significant enhancement to Impression Publisher not present in Impression Style was support for irregular frames, albeit only for frames containing graphics, not text. This kind of frame was able to repel text in text frames, thus removing the need for various workarounds that would otherwise be employed to cause text to be wrapped around other areas of a page. Such frames could have non-rectangular outlines involving additional points or nodes, and they could be rotated and scaled, but the irregular frame edge could only consist of straight line sections, not curves, and controls were not provided for precise positioning of outline points. Support for irregular text frames was stated as planned for subsequent versions.

Computer Concepts and the other vendors involved in providing the component applications of Acorn Advance - Clares and Iota - offered a Musketeer pack featuring Impression Style and the other "full-featured" versions of the Advance applications - Schema 2 and Datapower - as a form of upgrade for Advance users costing £249 plus VAT instead of the combined £385 plus VAT cost of the separate packages. (Curiously, Schema was originally developed by Acorn but transferred to Clares Micro Supplies as a consequence of a decision by Acorn to stop developing applications software itself.)

An enhanced Impression Publisher Plus product became available in 1994, adding support for various professional publishing features such as Open Pre-Press Interface (OPI) for the substitution of high resolution images when typesetting, Encapsulated PostScript (EPS) and Desktop Colour Separation (DCS), along with other enhancements such as a new colour selection tool supporting spot, process and tint colour handling. The price of Publisher Plus was £299 plus VAT, with an upgrade from Publisher costing £130 plus VAT, with the additional features producing a product with "Quark-like facilities at a substantially lower price". The other enhancements were regarded as "nice extra touches", although a "proper" undo option was still absent, and other noted frustrations with Publisher's user interface remained. A 32-bit conversion and improvement project initiated in 2003 was named Impression-X.

== Impact ==
Impression II was adopted as part of the solution employed by Acorn User magazine as "the first newstrade magazine to 'go live' with Archimedes-based DTP", having already produced editorial supplements using software running on the Archimedes platform. Computer Concepts LaserDirect and Integrex ColourCel printers were used alongside A440, and subsequently A540, computers. The experiences from this adoption exercise were apparently fed back to Acorn and Computer Concepts to inform further product refinements, with the editorial team stating a belief that a similar solution marketed as a product would be "a serious alternative to Apple Macintosh and PC-based systems" in the broader desktop publishing market. Acorn User reverted to using the Macintosh platform when the title was acquired by Europress, this mostly due to working practices at its new owner, with any "weaknesses" in Impression II said to be mostly resolved by the introduction of Impression Publisher and accompanying OPI functionality. However, a renewed effort saw complete issues of Acorn User once again produced using Acorn-based technology in 1995, starting with a redesign exercise in December 1994 and gradually moving to a Risc PC-based solution employing Impression Publisher Plus.

Other professional users adopted Impression II and direct-drive printing hardware on the Acorn platform. For example, The Journal of Physiology, published through Cambridge University Press by the Physiological Society at Cambridge University, employed A540 and A5000 machines augmented with State Machine graphics cards in conjunction with Calligraph TQ1200 printers, with these peripherals being general competitors with Computer Concepts' own ColourCard and LaserDirect products, although the TQ1200 as an A3 printer had no direct competitor from Computer Concepts' own range.

The software was one of two packages recommended for use in primary teaching in the 1996 book Opportunities for English in the Primary School. It has been considered one of the most important applications in the history of the RISC OS platform.

== Development ==
Impression was originally developed concurrently with Computer Concepts' own operating system, Impulse, during the period when Arthur was the operating system delivered with Archimedes series machines, with Computer Concepts looking to offer Impulse as a replacement. During this period, only three developers worked on Impression while "everyone else [in the company] was working on Impulse". This operating system was never delivered, but Acorn perceived it as enough of a threat that pre-releases of RISC OS - Acorn's successor to Arthur - were apparently withheld from the Impression developers for competitive reasons. Later, having been invited to collaborate on the Advance integrated suite with Acorn, various visual aspects of Computer Concepts' products, notably the "3D box style", were adopted as part of Acorn's own visual style for RISC OS 3. The software itself was written using the BBC Basic assembler, assembled in pieces and linked using a dedicated linker.

A project to produce a fully 32-bit compliant version (compatible with the Iyonix PC and later ARM hardware) was announced by X-Ample Technology in 2003. This was named Impression-X. In 2004 it was explained that the process of 32-bitting was being complicated partly because of "the massive number of optimisation and 'tricks' Computer Concepts used". In 2005, Drobe editor Chris Williams suggested handing the project over to another party to complete. After only another 10 years, Impression-X was released in May 2015, and is now available from the PlingStore.

== Features ==
A document loader for Impression files was included with the 2.60 release of desktop publishing application Ovation Pro in 2000.

The software was copy protected via a dongle. However, the reliance on a dongle could be removed from Impression II (and ArtWorks) with a personalised version of the software issued on Computer Concepts' receipt of the dongle and an associated upgrade fee. The personalised version used various identifying characteristics of particular computer models and was only offered, at least initially, for A5000, A4, A3010, A3020 and A4000 owners.
