= Skencil =

- Skencil logo

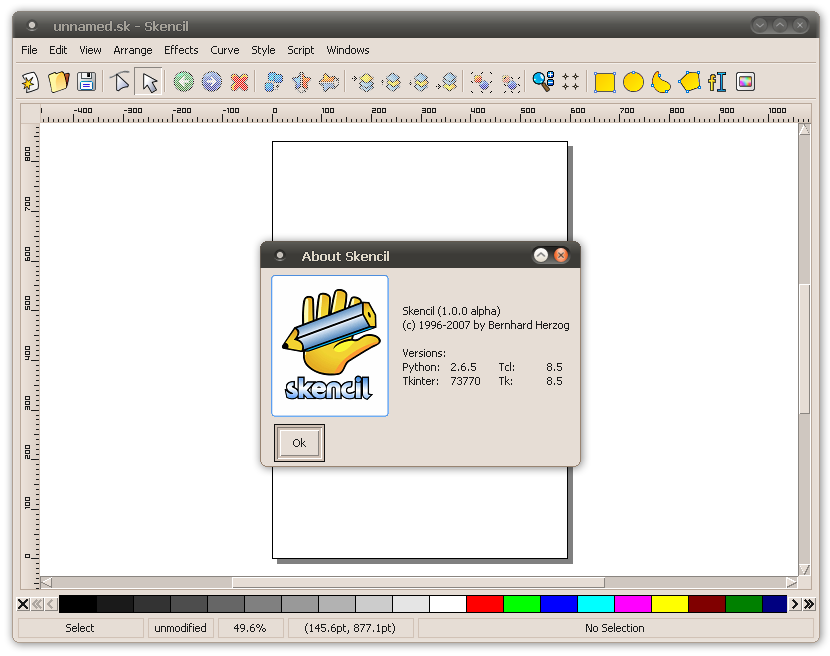
- Skencil 1.0 alpha on Ubuntu 10.04 LTS
- Other names: Sketch
- Original author: Bernhard Herzog
- Developer: sK1 Project
- Release: October 31, 1998; 27 years ago
- Final release: 0.6.17 / June 19, 2005; 21 years ago
- Preview release: 1.0 rc1 / November 4, 2016; 9 years ago
- Written in: C, Python
- Engine: Xlib, Tk, Tkinter, PyGTK
- Operating system: Linux, FreeBSD, Mac OS, Solaris, IRIX, AIX
- Platform: IA-32 (i386), DEC Alpha, m68k, PowerPC, SPARC, x86-64
- Predecessor: Sketch
- Successor: sK1
- Available in: 10+ languages
- List of languages English, Danish, German, French, Italian, Kinyarwanda, Portugal, Brazilian Portugal, Russian, Spanish, Swedish
- Type: Vector graphics editor
- License: GNU Library General Public License
- Website: www.skencil.org
- Repository: https://github.com/sk1project/skencil

Skencil, formerly called Sketch, is a free software vector graphics editor, released under the GNU Lesser General Public License.

== History ==
Its first public version, Sketch 0.5.0, was released on October 31, 1998 by Bernhard Herzog.

Sketch is an interactive X11 drawing program (similar to Xfig or Tgif).

— Bernhard Herzog, https://wald.intevation.org/scm/viewvc.php/skencil/skencil/trunk/README?revision=14&view=markup

Later Bernhard Reiter joined Sketch development.

On 7 February 2003, Sketch 0.7.12 development release was rolled out. It was the last under name Sketch.

=== Renaming ===
In 2003-2004, Sketch was renamed to Skencil.

* README: Sketch->Skencil renaming. Web-site is now skencil.org

— Bernard Herzog, https://wald.intevation.org/scm/viewvc.php/skencil/skencil/trunk/README?revision=379&view=markup

As claimed on its website, "Skencil is implemented almost completely in Python, a very high-level, object oriented, interpreted language, with the rest written in C for speed".

On 19 June 2005, Skencil 0.6.17 was released. It has versions compatible with Linux on the i386, DEC Alpha, m68k, PowerPC and SPARC architectures, with FreeBSD, with Solaris, with IRIX64 6.4, and with AIX. Since then development have been frozen and, as a result, its packages have been removed from Linux distributions repositories.

=== Revitalization ===
On 19 November 2006, Reiter and Herzog asked Ihor Novikov, sK1 Project lead developer, to join Skencil development.

On 31 October 2010, Skencil 1.0 alpha was released, as a result of revitalization work done by sK1 Project team that made it possible to use Skencil on 64-bit hardware and modern OS at the time. Source and binary packages for various Linux distributions has been published on sK1 Project's page on code.google.com, where it now archived.

On 4 November 2016, Skencil 1.0 rc1 was released and the last code changes committed on 7 February 2020 on sK1 Project's page on GitHub. There are no binary packages for this release.

=== sK1 ===
sK1 vector graphics editor, developed by sK1 Project team, written in wxWidgets become an independent Skencil successor (fork), improved by color management (including CMYK color space support), tabbed multiple document interface, Pango based text engine, Cairo based renderer and importers for CorelDRAW (CDR, CMX, CCX) and many other graphics file formats.

Future plans had included porting the user interface from Tk/Tkinter to GTK+, a multiple document interface, and multi-font, fully integrated multiline text, patterns fills instead of solid color, etc.

== See also ==
- Inkscape – Vector graphics editor
- Sodipodi – Vector graphics editor
- pstoedit – Computer program that converts PostScript and PDF files to other vector formats
- Xara Xtreme LX
- Comparison of vector graphics editors
