= Wordwise =

- Other names: Wordwise Plus, InterWord
- Developer: Computer Concepts
- Initial release: 1981 (Wordwise); 1984 (Wordwise Plus); 1986 (InterWord)
- Platform: BBC Micro; Acorn Archimedes (InterWord only)
- Type: Word processor

Wordwise is a word processor program published in 1981. It was the best selling word processor in the UK for the BBC Microcomputer during the 1980–1990 time period (~50,000 copies sold as of January 1985). The program was supplied on an 8K ROM, and was published by Computer Concepts. The use of ROM allowed the entire RAM of the host machine to be used for storing and manipulating the text, and providing printer-buffer functionality.

== Features ==
The program was not a WYSIWYG text editor. Printer codes, controlling the formatting of the text when printed, had to be defined via the OC command. followed by the exact string of Escape-sequence characters for the specific printer that you were using, to enable bold, italic, line-length, font-pitch, font size etc.

Many companies such as Watford Electronics provided utility-ROMS that allowed customers to use 'macro-commands' to call pre-programmed escape-sequences for their printers, vs. having to memorize / refer to cheat-sheets every time they wished to enable a font-change.

The program offered a rudimentary Print-preview mode, using the 80-column 'Mode 3' mode on the BBC Model B (ordinary text editing used the 'Mode 7' 40-column mode). However, this print preview mode could not display printer-specific effects such as Bold, underlining or Italic. (The BBC computer did not natively support the display of these font effects on-screen)

Expansion hardware (paged RAM) tools were also manufactured by companies such as Watford Electronics, to enable larger printer-buffers, and print-previewing of large documents in the 80-column screen modes.

More complete WYSIWYG functionality was only introduced later (again, subject to the same limitations of the font-display on the BBC), with the company's 'Inter Word' ROM in 1986. Due to these limitations, from an end user experience perspective, Wordwise was often thought of as not being as advanced as the competing 'View' word processor from Acornsoft.

Wordwise menu:

         WORDWISE
(C) Computer Concepts 1982

1) Save entire text
2) Load new text
3) Save marked text
4) Load text to cursor
5) Search and Replace
6) Print text
7) Preview text
8) Spool test

ESC Edit Mode

Please enter choice_

== Wordwise Plus ==
The program was upgraded in 1984 with the introduction of 'Wordwise Plus', on a 16K ROM. This introduced new features such as 'contiguous files', which used the entire space on an attached disk-drive as virtual memory. (The original Wordwise program limited the document size to 27K - the amount of usable RAM on a 32K BBC Micro Model B), up to 11 documents in memory simultaneously (1x main text document, and 10x 'Segments'), and a Macro-programming language, along with compatibility with the 6502 Second Processor.

=== Wordwise Plus features ===
Wordwise Plus main menu:

       WORDWISE-PLUS
(C) Computer Concepts 1984

1) Save entire text
2) Load new text
3) Save marked text
4) Load text to cursor
5) Search and Replace
6) Print text
7) Preview text
8) Spool test
9) Segment menu

ESC Edit Mode

Please enter choice_

== InterWord ==
In 1986 Computer Concepts published InterWord as a successor to Wordwise Plus. InterWord was shipped on a 32k ROM with a custom carrier board allowing specific memory accesses to page different parts of that ROM in and out of the 16k address space that the BBC Micro reserves for user ROMs. This approach was later expanded on by Computer Concepts for their 1987 ROM SpellMaster, which paged 128k into the 16k address space and acted as a spelling checker for InterWord, Wordwise and View.

InterWord was a menu-driven WYSIWYG wordprocessor which allowed 80-column editing (screen modes 0 or 3, with the latter taking less screen memory but displaying fewer lines on the screen), as well as a non-standard 106-column view using custom fonts. 40- and 53-column views were also available if a larger font was required or to reduce screen memory footprint, and the display would scroll horizontally when narrower than the printed page. InterWord could not use the extra-low-memory teletext mode except for its main menu, and recommended that the machine have Shadow RAM (like the BBC Master) so that screen memory would not be an issue.

Computer Concepts also published a spreadsheet (InterSheet) and graphing package (InterChart), and a database (InterBase). These ROMs could co-operate via their "ROM-Link", together holding up to 16 documents (word, sheet or database) simultaneously in RAM and switching between these on command, provided there was sufficient RAM for the documents. Using data from one document in another (such as mail-merging a database into a letter) was also possible.

As of 2023 only the MAME emulator can run InterWord as other emulators such as BeebEm do not emulate the custom carrier board that bank-switches its 32k ROM.

== Version history ==
Wordwise was upgraded multiple times during the lifetime of the product, as listed below:

Main ROMs - Computer Concepts

1982 - Wordwise

Wordwise-1.10
Wordwise-1.17
Wordwise-1.20

1985 - Wordwise Plus

WordwisePlus-1.48
WordwisePlus-1.49
WordwisePlus-1.4A
WordwisePlus-1.4C
WordwisePlus-1.4F

Ancillary programs and utilities (multiple vendors)

Spellcheck disks and ROMS
Printer driver ROMs
