= Scribus =

Desktop publishing application

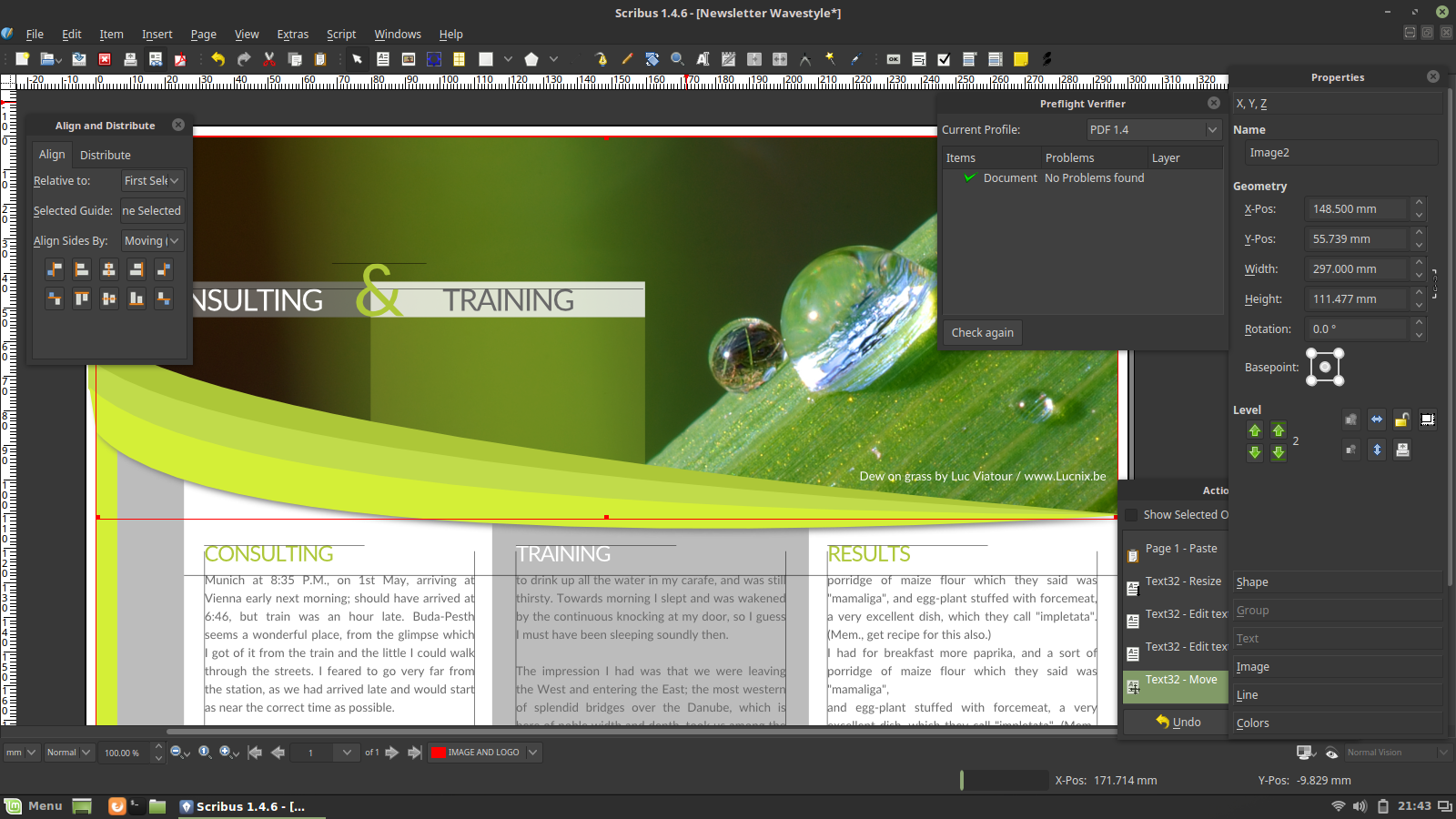
- Scribus 1.4.6 under Linux Mint 18
- Developer: The Scribus Team
- Release: 16 June 2001; 25 years ago
- Stable release: 1.6.6 / 13 April 2026; 6 months ago
- Preview release: 1.7.3 / 13 April 2026; 6 months ago
- Written in: C++ (Qt)
- Operating system: Linux/UNIX; Mac OS X 10.5-10.8 (up to 1.4.8); Mac OS X 10.9 (64-bit, up to 1.5.3), Mac OS X 10.10-10.12 (64-bit, up to 1.5.4), macOS X 10.13 (64-bit, up to 1.5.5); Windows 2000 (32-bit, up to 1.5.0), Windows Vista (64-bit), Windows 7 OS/2 Warp 4/eComStation (up to 1.5.0); ArcaOS; FreeBSD (up to 1.5.0), PC-BSD (up to 1.5.0), OpenBSD (up to 1.5.0), NetBSD (up to 1.5.0); Solaris (up to 1.4.8); OpenIndiana (up to 1.5.0); GNU/Hurd; Haiku
- Available in: Multilingual
- Type: Desktop publishing
- License: GNU LGPL 2.1, MIT, 3-clause BSD, Public domain
- Website: www.scribus.net
- Repository: sourceforge.net/projects/scribus/

Scribus (/ˈskraɪbəs/) is free and open-source desktop publishing (DTP) software available for most desktop operating systems. It is designed for layout, typesetting, and preparation of files for professional-quality image-setting equipment. Scribus can also create animated and interactive PDF presentations and forms. Example uses include writing newspapers, brochures, newsletters, posters, and books.

Scribus is written in Qt and released under the GNU General Public License. There are native versions available for Unix, Linux, BSD, macOS, Haiku, Microsoft Windows, OS/2 (including ArcaOS and eComStation) operating systems.

== General feature overview ==
Scribus supports most major bitmap formats, including TIFF, JPEG, and PSD. Vector drawings can be imported or directly opened for editing. The long list of supported formats includes Encapsulated PostScript, SVG, Adobe Illustrator, and Xfig. Professional type/image-setting features include CMYK colors and ICC color management. It has a built-in scripting engine using Python. It is available in 60 languages.

High-level printing is achieved using its own internal level 3 PostScript driver, including support for font embedding and sub-setting with TrueType, Type 1, and OpenType fonts. The internal driver supports full Level 2 PostScript constructs and a large subset of Level 3 constructs.

PDF support includes transparency, encryption, and a large set of the PDF 1.5 specification including layers (OCG), as well as PDF/X-3, including interactive PDFs form fields, annotations, and bookmarks.

The current file format, called SLA, is XML. Old versions of SLA were based on XML. Text can be imported from OpenDocument (ODT) text documents (such as from LibreOffice Writer), OpenOffice.org XML (OpenOffice.org Writer's SXW files), Microsoft Word's DOC, PDB, and HTML formats (although some limitations apply). ODT files can typically be imported along with their paragraph styles, which are then created in Scribus. HTML tags which modify text, such as bold and italic, are supported. Word and PDB documents are only imported as plain text.

ScribusGenerator is a mail merge-like extension to Scribus.

=== Scribus 1.6 (and the 1.5 development branch) ===
Scribus 1.5.1 added PDF/X-4 support.

Initially, Scribus did not properly support complex script rendering and so could not be used with Unicode text for languages written in Arabic, Hebrew, Indic, and Southeast Asian writing systems, even though it supported Unicode character encoding. In August 2012, it was announced that a third party had developed a system to support complex Indic scripts. In May 2015 it was announced that the ScribusCTL project had started to improve complex layout by integrating the OpenType text-shaping engine HarfBuzz into the official Scribus 1.5.1svn branch. In July 2016 it was announced that the text layout engine had been rewritten from scratch in preparation for support of complex scripts coming in Scribus 1.5.3 and later. In December 2016 Scribus announced they got support for OpenType advanced feature in 1.5.3svn, as well as complex script and RTL direction.

Scribus 1.4.7 did not have OpenType alternative glyph support, so ligatures, for example, were not inserted automatically; this became available from v1.5.3.

== Support for other programs and formats ==
Scribus cannot read or write the native file formats of other desktop publishing programs such as QuarkXPress or InDesign; the developers consider that reverse engineering those file formats would be prohibitively complex and could risk legal action from the makers of those programs.

Due to licensing issues, the software package does not include support for the Pantone color matching system (PMS), which is included in some commercial desktop publishing applications. Pantone colors can be obtained and incorporated within Scribus without licensing issues. Scribus is shipped with more than 100 color palettes, most donated by various commercial color vendors, but also including scientific, national, and government color standards.

=== Scribus 1.6 (and the 1.5 development branch) ===
Support for importing Microsoft Publisher is incorporated into version 1.5, and QuarkXPress Tag files, InDesign's IDML, as well as InCopy's ICML formats were added to the development branch.

Scribus 1.5.3 onwards contains more than 300 color palettes.

German Organisation freieFarbe e.V. built last HLC Colour Atlas for real colours based on CIELAB. This free Colour Palette is also available in Scribus 1.5.4+.

Scribus 1.5.6 supports native PDF export with embedded open type fonts and PDF 1.6. Python 3 is now default in scripts. Scribus 1.5.7 improves undo and redo action. Qt 5.14 is new base for compilation and 3rd party components have newer versions. Next version is 1.5.8 as perhaps last step before 1.6.0.

From view of developers Version 1.5.7 is stable. There are no new versions in pipe with backports for the 1.4 tree with the near end of Qt4 support in most systems.

Scribus 1.5.8 supports full Python 3 support also for MacOS and modern UI features like Dark Mode.

== Books ==
Books about Scribus are available in several languages, as is a manual for using Scribus 1.3 in desktop publishing.

== Significant users ==
Janayugom, a Malayalam daily newspaper in Kerala, India, migrated all desktop publishing to Scribus and Gimp in November 2019, saving over 10 million Indian rupees (approximately US$130,000).

French artist David Revoy, known for the Pepper&Carrot webcomic, uses Scribus for the layouts of the print volumes of the series.

New Escapologist magazine, according to a colophon in the back of each issue, has been made using Scribus since its fourteenth issue in 2023.

== See also ==
- Comparison of desktop publishing software
- List of desktop publishing software
