= Acorn Arcade =

Website focused on the RISC OS operating system

- Custom logo for Guy Fawkes Night
- Available in: English
- Creators: Alasdair Bailey, Graham Crockford
- Website: acornarcade.com
- Commercial: No
- Registration: Optional
- Launched: 1997; 29 years ago
- Current status: Online

Acorn Arcade is a computing resource website with a focus on the RISC OS operating system and its gaming scene. It has been recognised by Acorn User magazine and was an award winner at the Wakefield Acorn Computer Show.

== History ==
Acorn Arcade was founded in 1997 by Alasdair Bailey and Graham Crockford. It was awarded the 1998 Wakefield Acorn Spring Show 'Best Acorn enthusiast website' and was listed in Acorn User as "the leading website for information on current RISC OS game developments".

Its contents were incorporated into The Icon Bar in 2006. It has been selected for inclusion by editors in at least one web directory,

== Main features ==
The original site featured RISC OS articles, news, game reviews and other media. Since its merger with The Icon Bar, the site showcases that news content under its own skin, while retaining its own separate game-related areas.
