= The Icon Bar =

Website

- Available in: English
- Owner: One Point Nought
- Creators: Tim Fountain, Alasdair Bailey, Richard Goodwin
- Website: iconbar.com
- Commercial: No
- Registration: Optional
- Launched: 2000; 26 years ago
- Current status: Online

The Icon Bar (also referred to as TIB) is a computing and technology website with a focus on the RISC OS computer operating system.

== History ==
The Icon Bar was founded in 2000 by Tim Fountain, Alasdair Bailey and Richard Goodwin. In 2004, co-founder Richard Goodwin was nominated for the Drobe awards for keeping the "popular forum" online. It was further developed by the same people who developed Acorn Arcade, the contents of which were incorporated in 2006. At this time, it broadened its remit to also cover alternative platforms and new technologies, while still keeping abreast of the RISC OS scene.

When Drobe closed as a news site in 2009, The Icon Bar was cited as a notable alternative and took over running the annual awards scheme for the RISC OS scene. It has been selected for inclusion by editors in at least one web directory,

== Content ==
The site features RISC OS articles, news, forums and other media. It also hosts a Media Watch page, where users can share any relevant items they spot in the media.
