= Xara =

UK-based software company founded in 1981

The Xara Group, Ltd.
- Type: Subsidiary
- Founded: 25 July 1981
- Headquarters: London, United Kingdom; Berlin, Germany
- Key people: Charles Moir (founder)
- Owner: Xara GmbH

Xara is an international software company founded in 1981, with an HQ in Berlin and development office in Hemel Hempstead, UK. It has developed software for a variety of computer platforms, in chronological order: the Acorn Atom, BBC Micro, Z88, Atari ST, Acorn Archimedes, Microsoft Windows, Linux, and more recently web browser-based services.

== History ==
The company was founded in 1981 by Charles Moir. It started by developing for various 8-bit systems, such as the Acorn Atom and BBC Micro. It was originally called Computer Concepts, Ltd.; the company name was changed to Xara, Ltd., in 1995, and later to The Xara Group, Ltd. iXara Ltd started to explore cloud developments, and since 2016 both companies have been subsidiaries of Xara GmbH.

=== Atari ST and Acorn Archimedes development ===
Dissatisfied with the evolution of Acorn's product range, having "stretched the BBC micro beyond the limit", Computer Concepts announced in late 1985 that the company would concentrate on development for the Atari ST, noting that its need for software was similar to that of the early days of the BBC Micro. Support was set to continue for the company's BBC Micro products, however, and despite showing the Atari ST at the Acorn User Exhibition in 1986, the company introduced new products for the BBC Micro: the Inter-Base and Inter-Word office suite products.

The company remained underwhelmed by Acorn's product range and the introduction of the BBC Master series in 1986, with one representative dismissing the series as "a real let-down" and uncompetitive with the emerging 16-bit competition, while comparing the performance and cost of the PC-compatible Master 512 unfavourably to the Atari ST. However, the potential of Acorn's RISC processor was acknowledged, raising hopes of "a tidy, all-in-one, expandable, fast, large memory RISC-based micro for around the £1000 mark".

In 1986, Computer Concepts released its first piece of software for the Atari ST, Fast ASM, but the company's development focus returned to the Acorn platform when the Acorn Archimedes was released in 1987, pledging "almost exclusively ARM-related" development and indicating that software developed for the Archimedes would not merely be conversions of ST-based software already in progress. Various existing BBC Micro products were to be offered to run under emulation on the Archimedes, but the principal new product was to be a "WYSIWYG wordprocessor which makes full use of the RISC windowing environment". This word processor would eventually be released as Impression.

ArtWorks, the predecessor to Xara Xtreme, was released on the Archimedes, having been announced early in the life of the machine as an "object-orientated drawing package, similar to MacDraw in many respects". By the mid-1990s, the company had determined that the size of the Acorn market was not large enough to provide the revenues needed to invest in developing "the best new programs", and that the tools available for Windows (C++ compilers and class libraries) facilitating development of such new products were not likely to become available for the RISC OS platform, despite the company encouraging Acorn and others to provide them. Once again in its history, Computer Concepts insisted that it was not abandoning the Acorn market, noting the introduction of various product upgrades and peripherals for the Acorn machines, while promoting Xara Studio – "really like an ArtWorks Version 2" – to users of the Risc PC with PC processor card. Since the Computer Concepts name was not suitable for international use, the Xara name had been adopted to market PC-based products.

Computer Concepts had been developing its own operating system, Impulse, along with a hardware product (originally named Equinox) consisting of two IBM PC-compatible expansion cards providing Acorn's ARM-based chipset that would "take over processing from the host PC" and run the Impulse operating system, although the company had also stated an intention to make Impulse available for the Archimedes and thereby support its own applications running on Acorn's own hardware. With the introduction of RISC OS and the elimination of many of the concerns about the earlier Arthur operating system, the company announced support in their applications for both Impulse and RISC OS, but ended up only releasing RISC OS versions of applications such as Impression.

Another hardware product that was planned but not apparently realised in its original form was a laser printer card for IBM PC-compatible machines, employing Acorn's ARM chipset and Computer Concepts' own PostScript clone. A package containing the PC, printer card, a fax card and scanner was "expected to cost about £4000", and was set to be announced at the Personal Computer Show in September 1988 as "the launchpad for an ambitious office system". Acorn had already delivered a similar direct-drive laser printing solution to Olivetti by the time of the planned announcement, with the intention of incorporating the solution into Olivetti's ETV range. Fax and printer cards both subsequently featured in Computer Concepts' Archimedes-based product line as the FaxPack and LaserDirect, respectively.

Having been announced early in the life of the Archimedes, FaxPack was delayed after "serious interrupt latency problems" were experienced with the Archimedes' original operating system, Arthur, which impaired the product's ability to receive faxes. With the original hardware undergoing regulatory approval, and with Acorn unwilling to commit to fixing the problem at that time and suggesting changes to the FaxPack hardware instead, Computer Concepts suspended development and focused on work around its document processor product, Impression. Ultimately, RISC OS incorporated fixes resolving the reported problems, and an improved product was resubmitted for approval and readied for eventual relaunch. A later upgrade introduced basic answering machine functionality and support for file transfers between FaxPack-equipped computers.

Hardware products were a significant component of Computer Concepts' product range, and the company, having developed its own hardware expansions for the Archimedes series, acquired a majority stake in Newcastle-based peripheral manufacturer Wild Vision in 1992 in order to strengthen both companies' multimedia and desktop video product offerings, with this collaboration yielding a number of audiovisual products such as the Eagle and Lark expansion cards. Wild Vision was eventually integrated as a subsidiary in 1994, with Computer Concepts taking over responsibility for marketing and distribution of Wild Vision's products, remaining part of the business until 1996 when Acorn's ART division acquired the rights to the company's product range along with the services of founder Peter Wild for "an exclusive two year contract". The company had been making MPEG-based video boards for Acorn's Online Media division, and the takeover was therefore regarded as a "progressional" development for both parties.

=== Xara Networks ===
In 1995, a subsidiary company called Xara Networks, Ltd. was formed, specializing in the provision of high-bandwidth Internet connectivity to companies and ISPs. Xara Networks was subsequently sold to the ITG group in London, most commonly known for the Global Internet brand, and was subsequently renamed GX Networks.

=== Move to Windows ===
Early in the 1990s, Xara began developing for Microsoft Windows, as Acorn Computers struggled for market share. Artworks was rewritten from the ground up for the platform and in 1994 it was released as Xara Studio. This involved a team of 20+ developers, who worked for more than two years to produce a competitor to then market-leading drawing software CorelDRAW. This effort produced a product initially known as Camelot although also known as ArtWorks for Windows prior to release. Computer Concepts had, by this point, apparently produced "many PC products in the past" including its ScanLight packages.

The Canadian company Corel brought the marketing rights of the software and re-branded it as CorelXARA. Corel marketed it as a web-oriented companion to CorelDRAW, but it was clearly designed as a stand-alone alternative to the older software. The arrangement with Corel ended after five years.

In 2000, Xara released the software themselves as Xara X, which was superseded by Xara X¹ in 2004, then Xara Xtreme in 2005, later renamed Xara Photo & Graphic Designer. In 2006, an enhanced version was released, named Xara Xtreme Pro, later renamed Xara Designer Pro.

Xara has released other Windows titles relating to publishing and design, for print and the web, including Web Designer, Page & Layout Designer and Xara 3D Maker.

=== Xara Cloud SaaS (Software as a Service) ===
Since 2015, Xara has offered cloud based services under the name of Xara Online Designer while in beta, with full release under the name Xara Cloud in 2018. Xara Cloud can be used to create, edit and share a range of business documents in a web browser using any device. These can be documents created with Xara's desktop titles, or any of the document templates provided by Xara Cloud.

== Location ==
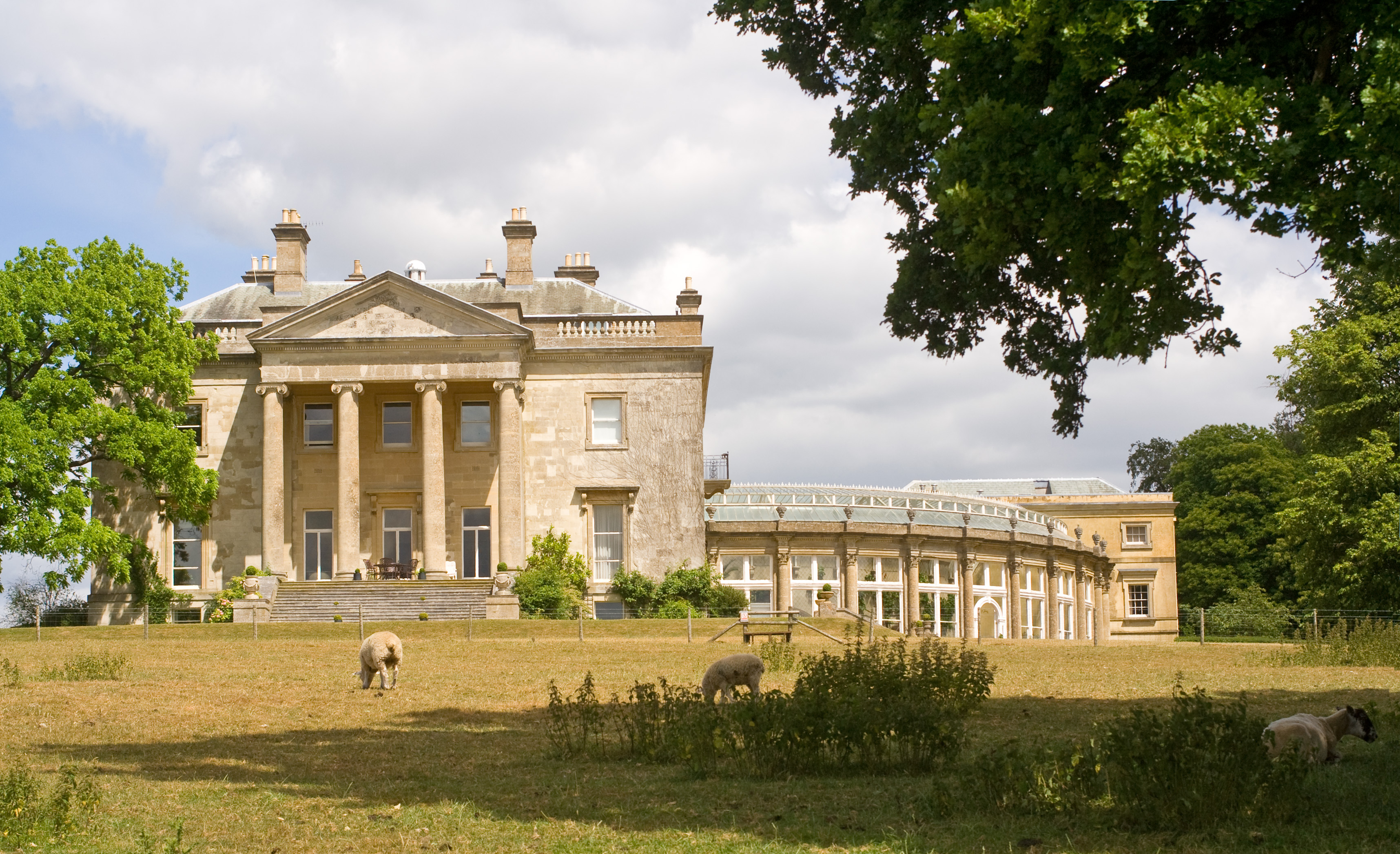
Gaddesden Place in Hertfordshire

Since 1984, Xara's development has taken place in Gaddesden Place, Hemel Hempstead, an 18th-century Palladian style villa, designed by the celebrated architect James Wyatt, built in 1768 and reputed to be his first building in the UK. Xara HQ is now in Berlin.

== List of products by platform ==
=== BBC Micro ===
- Wordwise – a ROM based word processor
- Disc Doctor – utility software
- Graphics ROM – graphics utilities
- SpellMaster – a ROM-based spell checker. Believed to be the world's first check-as-you-type spell checker
- Inter-Word, Inter-Sheet, Inter-Chart, Inter-Base – a suite of ROM based productivity applications

=== Atari ST ===
- Back-Pack – a desktop accessory suite
- Fast ASM (1986) – 68000 assembler
- Fast BASIC – a ROM-based, BBC BASIC-like semi-compiled BASIC language

=== Acorn Archimedes / RISC OS ===
- ArtWorks (1991) – vector graphics drawing software. Predecessor to Xara Photo & Graphic Designer. The first drawing program to offer real-time vector anti-aliasing. MW Software continued development from 1996 onwards.
- Impression – desktop publishing package (and variants Impression Style, Impression Publisher)
- Equasor – equation building tool
- Formulix – equation building tool
- AudioWorks – audio editor
- WordWorks – English dictionary and Thesaurus
- TurboDrivers – a range of printer drivers
- MacFS – utility to read and write Apple Mac discs
- Compression – general purpose compression utility, similar to ZIP (file format)

The company also developed a range of hardware for the Acorn Archimedes including:

- ColourCard – graphics card – providing a secondary framebuffer using 512 KB of dual-ported RAM, utilising the Inmos G332, supporting display modes with higher resolutions and refresh rates, introducing individually programmable 24-bit palette entries to 256-colour modes (and thus permitting smoother colour gradients), and also offering display modes with 15 and 16 bits-per-pixel colour (these being for non-desktop use due to limitations with RISC OS at the time of introduction)
- ScanLight – a range of hand-held and flatbed scanners and software
- LaserDirect – a range of laser printers. Of particular note was a product capable of 600 dpi involving Canon LBP-4 printer engines, purchased directly from Canon and resold by Computer Concepts, which used its own drivers and laser modulation techniques (hardware and software) to increase the printer's resolution to 600 dpi. This product was introduced at a price of £403 for the interface board and driver software, with the printer available from Computer Concepts for £1507, although it could also be procured independently.
- ColourDirect – a range of colour inkjet printers, starting with the Canon BJC800 360 dpi, A3-capable printer, priced as a complete solution for £1995 plus VAT.
- Lark – a 16-bit audio recording and playback card with MIDI support, compatible with many Archimedes models and the Risc PC. The card was provided with the AudioWorks software for sample recording and editing, along with utilities for audio mixing and playback. The price of the card was £199 plus VAT.

=== Windows ===
- Xara Studio (1994)
- CorelXARA (1996)
- Xara Webstyle (1998)
- Xara X (2000)
- Xara X¹ (2004)
- Xara Xtreme (2005)
- Xara Xtreme Pro (2006)
- Xara 3D Maker – creates 3D text, graphics and animations such as headings, logos, titles and buttons
- Xara Web Designer (2009) – WYSIWYG web design program
- Xara Page & Layout Designer (2013) – combines page layout, word processor and image editing capabilities
- Xara Photo & Graphic Designer – vector illustration, photo editing & graphic design
- Xara Designer Pro – combines the features and content of Web Designer, Photo & Graphic Designer, and Page & Layout Designer

=== Linux and Mac OS X ===
- Xara Xtreme LX (2006) – open source/free software port of the software. Since 2008 there has been no further development of Xara Xtreme for Linux.

=== Cloud SaaS ===
- Xara Cloud – a cloud-based service that enables the collaborative editing and sharing of documents designed with Xara's desktop titles or based on Xara Cloud templates, in a web browser using any platform.
