= Marq (company) =

Cloud-based brand management and templated content creation software

LPS Holdco LLC
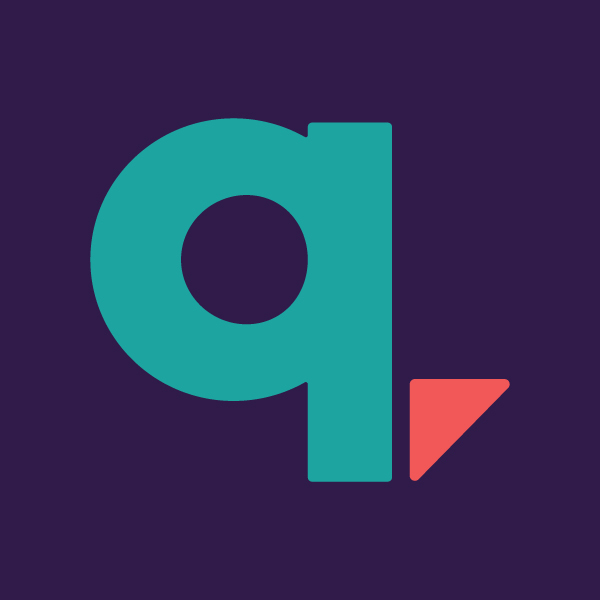
- Type: Private
- Industry: Graphic design; Software
- Predecessor: Lucidpress
- Founded: 2013
- Headquarters: Draper, Utah, United States
- Area served: Worldwide
- Key people: Owen Fuller (CEO)
- Products: Marq, Marq Pro, Marq Team, Marq for Enterprise, Marq for Education, Marq for Nonprofits
- Website: www.marq.com

Marq
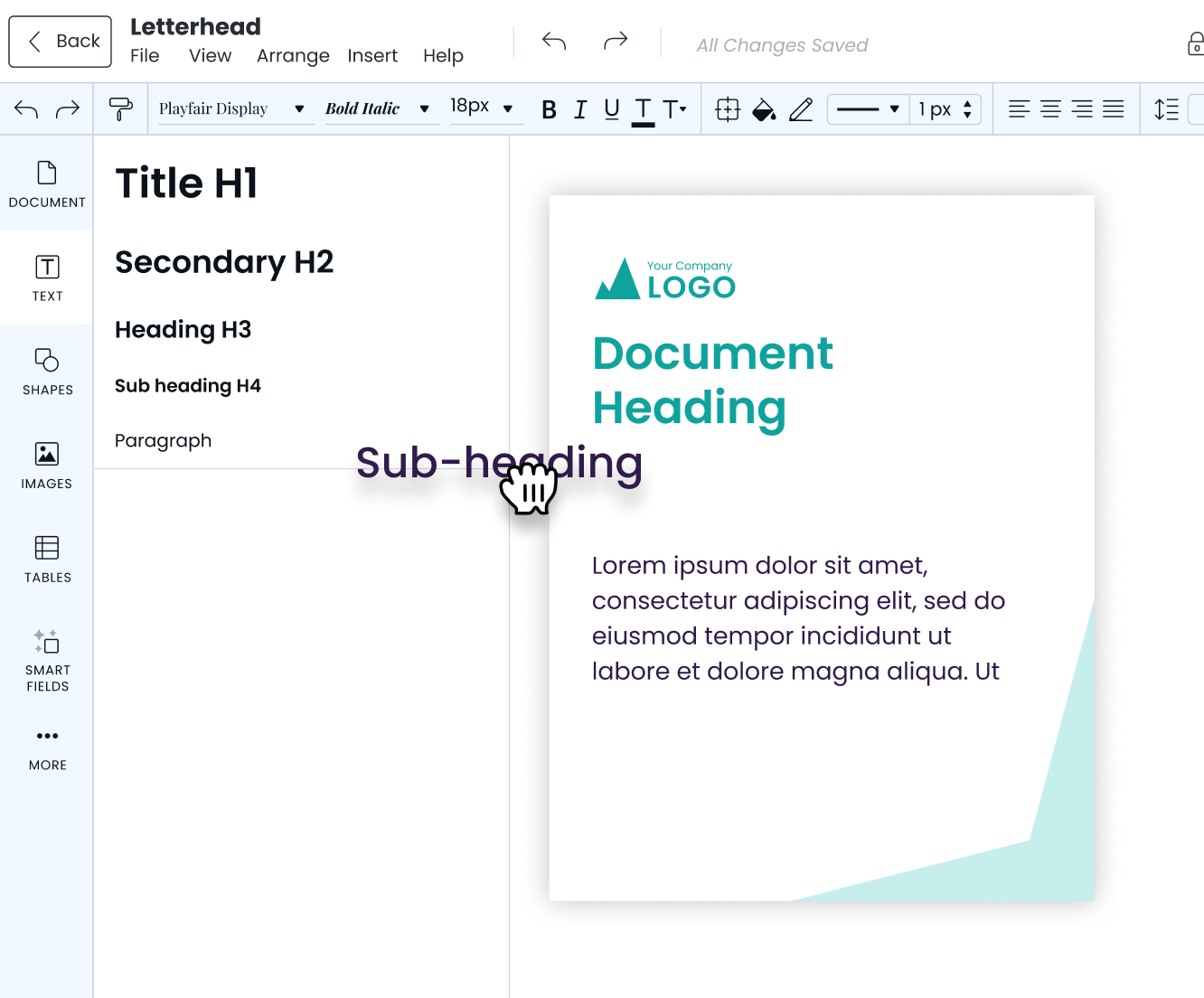
- Developer: Marq
- Release: October 2013
- Operating system: Android, ChromeOS, iOS, Linux, Mac, Windows
- Platform: Web-based
- Predecessor: Lucidpress
- Available in: English, Deutsch, Español, Français, 日本語, Nederlands, Português (Brasil), Русский, Italiano
- Type: Desktop publishing, Brand templating
- License: SaaS
- Website: www.marq.com

Marq (formerly Lucidpress) is a cloud-based software platform for brand management and templated content creation. The platform integrates with digital asset management (DAM) systems—including Aprimo and Bynder and customer relationship management (CRM) tools such as Salesforce and HubSpot. Marq also includes AI-assisted features for brand compliance and content automation.

Trade publications have described the product as a brand templating and creative automation platform.

== History ==
In October 2013, Lucid Software, Inc. announced Lucidpress as a public beta version. Following its release, Lucidpress was featured in TechCrunch, VentureBeat and PC World, with TechCrunch noting: "I had a chance to test the app before its launch and it is indeed very easy to use. If you've ever used a desktop publishing app in the past, you'll feel right at home with Marq, as it features the same kind of standard top-bar menu and layout options as most other publishing apps. In terms of features, it can also hold its own against similar desktop-based apps."

In May 2021, Lucidpress announced that it had been acquired by Charles Thayne Capital ("CTC"), a growth-oriented and technology-focused private investment firm.

In May 2021, following its acquisition by Charles Thayne Capital, Lucidpress became fully independent. Owen Fuller, who had served as General Manager since 2017, was appointed Chief Executive Officer.

In 2022, Lucidpress was rebranded as Marq to reflect the company’s shift toward brand templating and creative automation tools, while continuing to support its publishing features.

== Features ==
Marq integrates with customer relationship management (CRM) platforms such as Salesforce and HubSpot, enabling the creation of personalized, on-brand sales and marketing materials. The platform also connects with multiple digital asset management (DAM) systems, including Bynder, Aprimo, MediaValet, PhotoShelter, Acquia, and Canto.

== Investment ==
Lucid Software raised $1 million in Seed in 2011, led by Google Ventures.

In May 2014, the company received a $5 million investment. The round was led by Salt Lake-based Kickstart Seed Fund.

In September 2016, the company received a $36 million investment from Spectrum Equity.

== See also ==
- Comparison of desktop publishing software
- List of desktop publishing software
