= The Print Shop =

Desktop publishing software

- Original authors: David Balsam; Martin Kahn
- Developer: Broderbund
- Release: 1984; 42 years ago
- Stable release: 23.1 / 2009; 17 years ago
- Operating system: Windows, macOS discontinued: Apple II, Atari 8-bit, MS-DOS, Commodore 64, J-3100, PC-98
- License: Proprietary software
- Website: www.broderbund.com, www.printshop.com, www.mackiev.com

The Print Shop is desktop publishing software originally published in 1984 by Broderbund.

== Description ==
The Print Shop creates signs, cards, banners, and letterheads. Designed by David Balsam and programmed by Martin Kahn for the Apple II, and ported by Corey Kosak to other computers, it became one of the most popular Apple II titles of all time. Versions for MS-DOS, Commodore 64, and Atari 8-bit computers followed, as did a variant for the Apple IIGS.

The Print Shop provides libraries of clip art and templates through a simple interface to create signs, posters, and banners with household dot-matrix printers. Over the years, the software has been updated to accommodate changing file formats and printer technologies.

== Reception ==
The Print Shop was very successful. In 1985, it and Ghostbusters were reportedly the two most widely pirated Commodore 64 programs. II Computing listed it seventh on the magazine's list of top Apple II non-game, non-educational software as of late 1985, based on sales and market-share data. By late 1986 The Print Shop had been on the Softsel Hot List of best sellers for more than 120 weeks. Broderbund sold more than 800,000 copies by 1987. In 1988 the company announced that it had sold more than one million copies, and that sales of The Print Shop comprised 4% of the entire United States software market in 1987. In April 1989, it was awarded a "Diamond" certification from the Software Publishers Association for sales above 500,000 units. The series comprised 29% of Broderbund revenue in fiscal year 1992, and when Softkey purchased Broderbund, The Print Shop had been the latter's most profitable product for more than a decade. Kahn and Balsam reportedly earned tens of millions of dollars in royalties, and Korsak earned enough to buy a Porsche before college. Kahn and Balsam were not Broderbund employees. Their company Pixellite also benefited from The Print Shop; it sold color ink ribbons, and was reportedly the only source of color fanfold paper.

Creative Computing's Betsy Staples, a self-described "truly uncreative person", in 1984 praised the Apple II version of The Print Shop as being "for me—and others of my ilk". Although the review copy of the software did not have documentation, she stated that "it will be superfluous. The program is completely self-documenting". Staples concluded that The Print Shop was "one of the most unusual and useful programs I have seen in a long time". The New York Times thought that The Print Shop was too limited to appeal to other than children producing crude novelties, but agreed that the self-explanatory software's manual was superfluous. Agreeing on the documentation not being needed, InfoWorld concluded that The Print Shop was an "easy-to-use, complete, fun" way "to do new things with your printer".

Ahoy!'s reviewer in 1985 called the Commodore 64 version of The Print Shop "one of the best thought out, easiest to use packages I've come across", also reporting that he did not need to use the manual to produce his first greeting cards. He predicted that the software "is destined to become one of the most popular packages for the Commodore 64". II Computing criticized the Apple II version's inflexible layout options and lack of print preview, but concluded that it "is truly 'a graphics utility for the rest of us', encouraging creativity and self-expression ... you'll want to use this program over and over again". Jerry Pournelle of BYTE said that "programs like the excellent Print Shop series ... are making it possible for authors to have real control over what their text looks like when it gets into print".

== The Print Shop Companion ==
The Print Shop Companion, developed by Roland Gustafsson and released in 1985, added a calendar feature, an updated graphic editor, font and border editors, and a "Creature Maker" game, as well as an expanded library of fonts, borders, and graphics. Initially, to use the new fonts and borders in The Print Shop Companion had to modify the original program; subsequent releases of The Print Shop included built-in support for Companion.

In 1986, the first Apple Macintosh version was released. It featured graphics by Marney Morris and was the most powerful version available at the time. It was popular in schools and contained a unique feature with which graphics could be transferred to or from a MacPaint file.

Graphics libraries for The Print Shop came from Broderbund and other vendors, and were also popular. Libraries were produced for the original version and continued to be rolled out as late as the 1990s. User-produced graphics were also commonly distributed by various user groups, and even submitted to disk magazines, such as the Softdisk family of magazines.

== The New Print Shop and subsequent versions ==
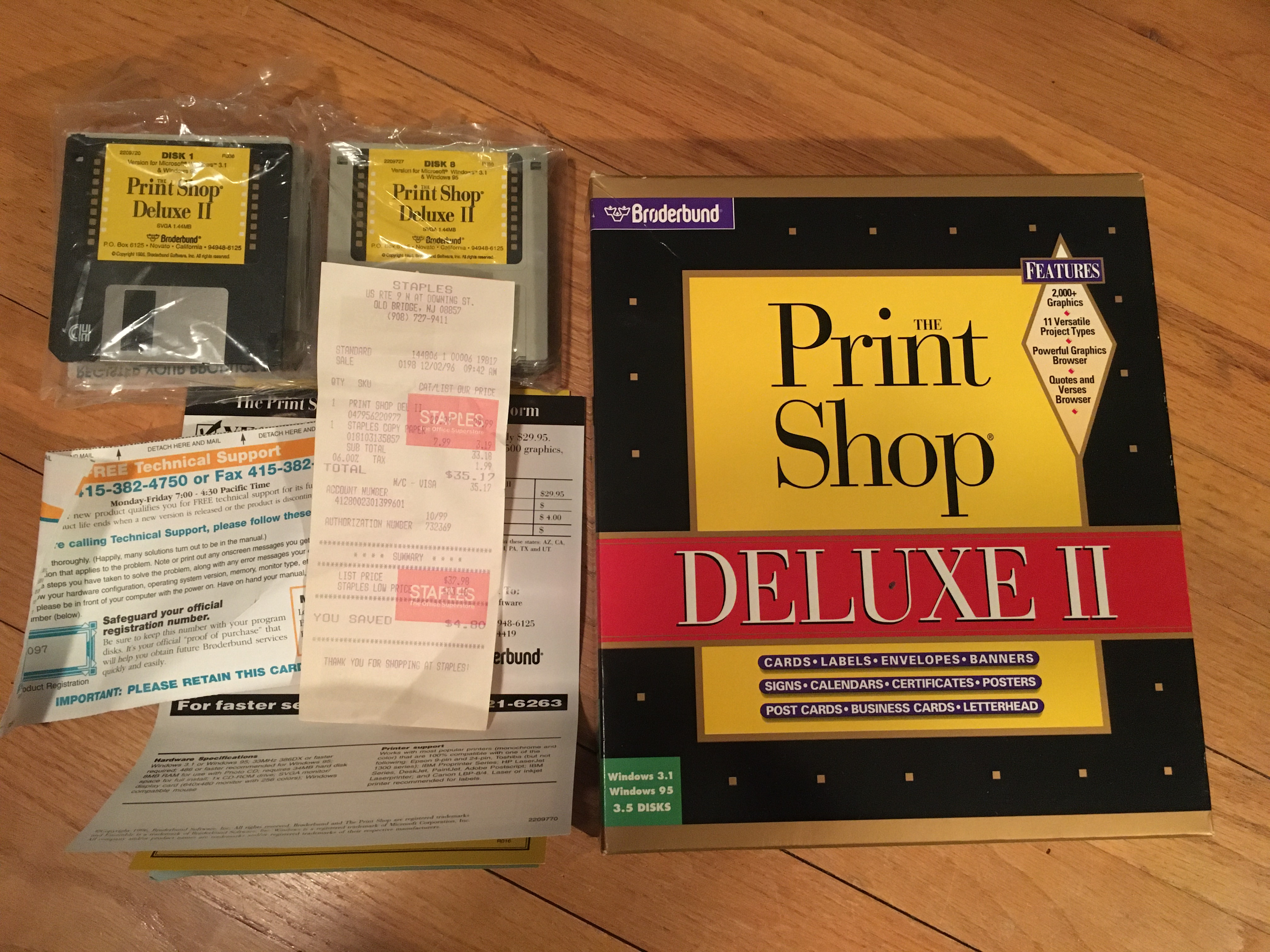
Print Shop Deluxe II for Windows box and installation diskettes, from 1996

The New Print Shop came out in 1988 for Apple II and MS-DOS, and improved on the original. Print Shop Deluxe, for Mac, MS-DOS, and Windows, followed in 1993. Deluxe used a new all-graphical interface still found in Print Shop programs today and allowed for the creation of calendars. Print Shop Deluxe Companion added new modules and graphics, and the Ensemble version combined The Print Shop, the Companion, and several graphics libraries on one CD.

Many new versions of The Print Shop followed, such as Ensemble II. Now over 20 years old, Print Shop still generates printed greeting cards, banners, and signs. It offers new types of printed output, including CD and DVD labels and inserts, iPod skins, and photo book pages. For small-business users, it also offers projects such as business cards, letterheads, and presentations.

On January 15, 2010, a new version for the PC-supporting Windows 7 titled The Print Shop 2.0 was released, published by Encore, Inc. It is published in Standard, Deluxe, and Professional variants.

To address Windows 7 support for pre-2.0 projects, an incremental release to the old line, The Print Shop Version 2.1 was released in July 2010.

For macOS (formerly Mac OS X), the most recent version is 4.0, developed and published by Software MacKiev, and released in December 2017. An update to provide 64-bit compatibility (version 4.1) was released in December 2021. Currently version 4.1 is only available as an academic license through Learning Services.

== Reception ==
Print Shop Deluxe was reviewed in the Oppenheim Toy Portfolio Guide Book where it was praised for "produc[ing] high-quality greeting-cards, signs, stationery, banners, calendars, gift tags and posters".

== See also ==
- Comparison of desktop publishing software
- List of desktop publishing software
