= SK1 (program) =

Open source cross platform illustration program

sK1
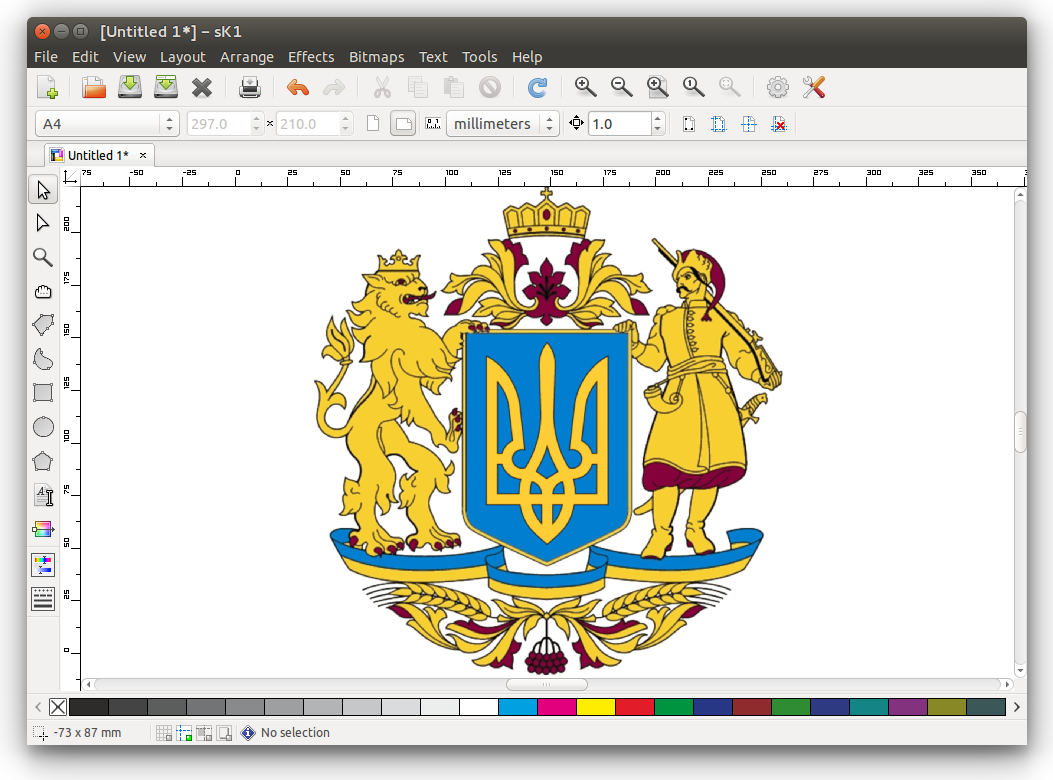
- A screenshot of sK1
- Developer: sK1 Team
- Stable release: 2.0RC5 / 31 August 2021
- Written in: Python, C, wxWidgets
- Operating system: Linux, Windows
- Platform: IA-32 and x64
- Type: Vector graphics editor
- License: GPL-3.0-or-later
- Website: sk1project.net/sk1/
- Repository: github.com/sk1-project/sk1-wx

UniConvertor
- Developer: sK1 Team
- Stable release: 2.0RC4 / 27 May 2019
- Written in: Python, C
- Operating system: Linux, Windows, macOS
- Platform: IA-32 and x64
- Type: Vector graphics translator
- License: AGPL-3.0-or-later
- Website: sk1project.net/uc2/
- Repository: github.com/sk1-project/sk1-wx

sK1 is an open-source, cross-platform illustration program that seeks to be a substitute for professional proprietary software like CorelDRAW or Adobe Illustrator. Unique project features are CorelDRAW formats importers, tabbed multiple document interface, Cairo-based engine, and color management.

== History ==
A small team led by Igor Novikov started the project in 2003, based on the existing open source vector graphics editor Skencil. sK1 is a fork of the Skencil 0.6.x series which used Tk widgets for the user interface (this version had been dropped by the main Skencil developers who were working on a branch of the program based on GTK+).

In 2007 the sK1 team reverse-engineered the CorelDRAW (CDR) format. The results and the first working snapshot of the CDR importer were presented at the Libre Graphics Meeting 2007 conference taking place in May 2007 in Montreal (Canada). Later on the team parsed the structure of other Corel formats with the help of CDR Explorer. Export into CDR and CMX file formats was presented at the Libre Graphics Meeting 2019 conference taking place in May 2019 in Saarbrücken (Germany).

== Target audience ==
Since the project was started by a small team of Ukrainian professionals in prepress, it was focused on full support for PostScript, PDF, CMYK color model and color management at the expense of developing some advanced functions for illustrators. Informally the project is positioned as a free open source alternative to the commercial CorelDRAW.

== Functionality ==
Compared to Inkscape, sK1 has a limited feature set, adequate for simple sketching, while its user interface remains clean. Drawable objects include circles and ellipses, rectangles, text, Bézier curves, and straight lines. Those can be transformed in typical manners and aligned in multiple ways.

== Supported formats ==
Import

- CorelDRAW v7-X4 (CDR/CDT/CCX/CDRX/CMX)
- Adobe Illustrator up to version 9 (based on PostScript)
- Postscript (PS) and Encapsulated Postscript (EPS)
- Computer Graphics Metafile (CGM)
- Windows Metafile (WMF)
- XFIG
- Scalable Vector Graphics (SVG)
- Skencil/Sketch/sK1 (SK, SK1, SK2)
- Acorn Draw (AFF)
- PLT - HPGL cutting plotter files
- CorelDRAW palettes (CPL and XML)
- Adobe Swatch Exchange palettes (ASE)
- Adobe Photoshop palettes (ACO)
- Xara Designer palettes (JCW)
- GIMP/Inkscape palettes (GPL)
- LibreOffice palettes (SOC)
- Scribus palettes (XML)
- sK1 palettes (SKP)
- Adobe Photoshop files (PSD)
- GIMP files (XCF)
- Images BMP, PNG, JPG, JPEG2000, TIFF, GIF, PCX, PPM, WEBP, XBM, XPM

Export

- AI - Adobe Illustrator 5.0 (based on PostScript)
- PDF - Portable Document Format
- PS - PostScript
- SVG - Scalable Vector Graphics
- SK/SK1/SK2 - Skencil/Sketch/sK1
- CGM - Computer Graphics Metafile
- WMF - Windows Metafile
- PLT - HPGL cutting plotter files
- CorelDRAW palettes (CPL and XML)
- Adobe Swatch Exchange palettes (ASE)
- Adobe Photoshop palettes (ACO)
- Xara Designer palettes (JCW)
- GIMP/Inkscape palettes (GPL)
- LibreOffice palettes (SOC)
- Scribus palettes (XML)
- sK1 palettes (SKP)
- PNG - Portable Network Graphics

== Side projects ==
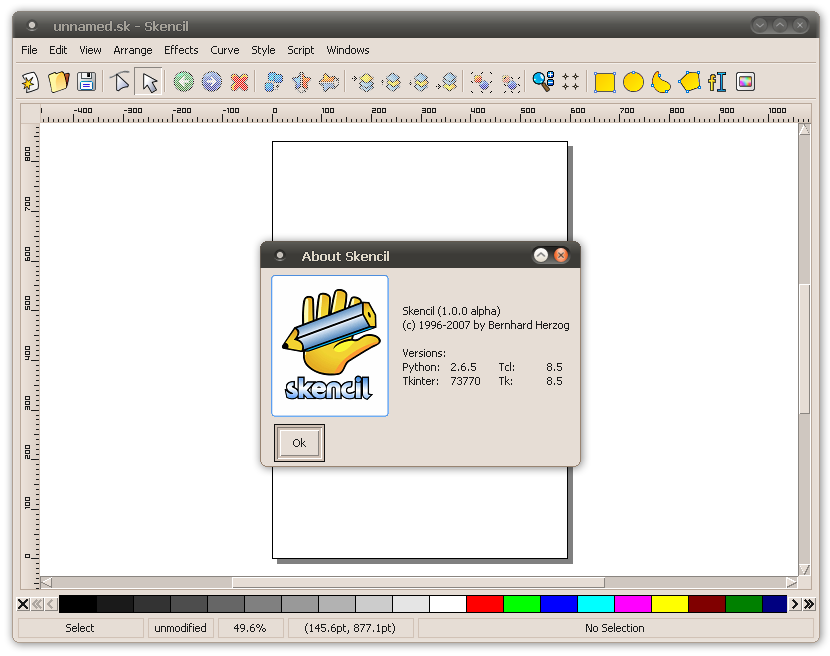
Skencil 1.0 alpha on Ubuntu 10.04

Skencil (revitalization)

On 19 November 2006, Bernhard Reiter and Bernhard Herzog asked Ihor Novikov to join Skencil development, stalled since 2005.

On 31 October 2010, Skencil 1.0 alpha was released, as a result of revitalization work done by Ihor Novikov.

On 4 November 2016, Skencil 1.0 rc1 was released, and the last code changes committed on 7 February 2020.

UniConvertor
an application for conversion of files from one vector format into another one. In fact it is a part of sK1, rewritten as a standalone code and being developed by the same team. UniConvertor is also used by Inkscape for opening CorelDRAW, WMF and Sketch/Skencil files.
Color Palette Collection
a set of free palettes provided in different native file formats for sK1, Inkscape, GIMP, Scribus, LibreOffice, CorelDRAW, Adobe Illustrator, Xara Designer etc. For sK1 2.0 the palette collection is available as a web service.
CDR Explorer
a program that simplifies the reverse-engineering of CorelDRAW formats.
LinCutter
an application for interactive work with cutting machines (PLT format).

== Awards ==
- In 2007 the project was awarded the second place in the Trophées du Libre open source project contest in the "Multimedia and games" category.
- In 2008 the project was awarded the third place in the contest Hackontest, organized by the Swiss Open Systems User Groupd /ch/open and sponsored by Google.
- In 2009 the project was awarded the second place in the contest "The best free project of Russia", conducted by Linux Format magazine. Among the group projects.
- In 2009 the UniConvertor project was awarded the first place in the Trophées du Libre open source project contest in the "Multimedia" category.

== sK1 versions ==
Version	Date	OS	Description
0.9.0	9 May 2009	Linux	First public release
0.9.1	10 November 2010	Linux	Release "Made in Brazil"
0.9.2	5 December 2014	Linux	Backport release with branch 2.0 changes
0.9.3	19 February 2015	Linux	Bugfix release
2.0RC1	6 May 2016	Linux, Windows	First public release for branch 2.0 based on wxWidgets
2.0RC2	20 October 2016	Linux, Windows	Completed vector graphics editor, but there is not import/export functionality
2.0RC3	13 April 2018	Linux, Windows	Bitmap graphics import (more than 100 file formats), import filters for GPL, SOC, JCW, CPL, ASE, XML palettes, SVG, PDF, WMF.
2.0RC4	27 May 2019	Linux, Windows	Import filters for CGM, FIG, CDR(CDRX), CMX, CCX, SVGZ. Export functionality for CGM, CMX, CDR.
2.0RC5	---	Linux, Windows	Under active development.
2.0	---	Linux, Windows	Future final release
Legend: Unsupported Supported Latest version Preview version Future version

== UniConvertor versions ==
Version	Date	OS	Description
1.0.0	15 November 2007	Linux	First public release
1.1.0	21 December 2007	Linux, Windows, MacOS X	Win32 and MacOS X support
1.1.1	1 February 2008	Linux, Windows	CorelDRAW X4 file format support
1.1.2	24 March 2008	Linux, Windows	Bugfix release
1.1.3	25 July 2008	Linux, Windows	PDF and PostScript support
1.1.4	5 June 2009	Linux, Windows	PLT import/export
1.1.5	26 June 2010	Linux, Windows	DXF, DST, PES, EXP, PCS import. MSI installer. GUI frontend.
1.1.6	25 February 2014	Linux, Windows	Bugfix release
2.0RC4	27 May 2019	Linux, Windows	First public release for branch 2.0; export for CDR and CMX, import/export for GPL, SOC, ASE, CPL, JCW, ACO, SKP
2.0RC5	---	Linux, Windows, macOS	Under active development
2.0	---	Linux, Windows, macOS	Future final release
Legend: Unsupported Supported Latest version Preview version Future version

== See also ==
- Comparison of vector graphics editors
