= CorelDRAW =

Vector graphics editor

- CorelDraw X8 under Windows 10
- Developer: Corel
- Release: January 16, 1989; 37 years ago
- Stable release: v27.0 / 6 March 2026; 6 months ago
- Written in: C++, C#
- Operating system: Microsoft Windows, macOS
- Available in: English, German, Japanese, Italian, French, Spanish, Brazilian Portuguese, Dutch, Polish, Czech, Russian, Simplified Chinese, Traditional Chinese, Turkish, Swedish,
- Type: Vector graphics editor, Raster graphics editor
- License: Proprietary
- Website: coreldraw.com

CorelDRAW is a vector graphics editor developed and marketed by Corel Corporation. It is also the name of the Corel graphics suite, which includes the bitmap-image editor Corel Photo-Paint as well as other graphics-related programs (see below). It can serve as a digital painting platform, desktop publishing suite, and is commonly used for production art in signmaking, vinyl and laser cutting and engraving, print-on-demand and other industry processes. Reduced-feature Standard and Essentials versions are also offered.

== History ==
In 1987, Corel engineers Michel Bouillan and Pat Beirne undertook to develop a vector-based illustration program to bundle with their desktop publishing systems. That program, CorelDraw, was initially released in 1989. CorelDraw 1.x and 2.x ran under Windows 2.x and 3.0. CorelDraw 3.0 came into its own with Microsoft's release of Windows 3.1. The inclusion of TrueType in Windows 3.1 transformed CorelDraw into a serious illustration program capable of using system-installed outline fonts without requiring third-party software such as Adobe Type Manager; paired with a photo-editing program (Corel Photo-Paint), a font manager, Corel Capture, and several other pieces of software, it was also part of the first all-in-one graphics suite.

=== Features by version ===
CorelDraw		Version support		OS Compatibility	New Features
Release date	Version	Reading files	Writing files	OS Compatibility	New Features
Jan 1989	1	1	1	Windows 2.1	First version
Mar 1989	1.01	1	1	2.1	Introduces backups on save, and draw rectangles from their centre
Apr 1989	1.02	1	1	2.1	IBM PIF file format support
Jul 1989	1.10	1	1	2.1	102 new fonts in Corel's proprietary WFN format, with WFNBOSS file font manager
Feb 1990	1.11	1	1	2.1	AutoCAD DXF import/export support
Sep 1991	2	1, 2	1, 2	Windows 3.0	Envelope tool (for distorting text or objects using a primary shape), Blend (for morphing shapes), Extrusion (for simulating perspective and volume in objects) and Perspective (to distort objects along X and Y axes). CorelDraw for Unix also became available.
15 May 1992	3	1, 2, 3	2, 3	Windows 3.0, 3.1 (preferred)	Included Corel Photo-Paint asp (for bitmap editing), CorelSHOW (for creating on-screen presentations), CorelCHART (for graphic charts), Mosaic and CorelTRACE (for vectorizing bitmaps). The inclusion of this software was the precedent for the actual graphic suites. CorelDraw for Unix also became available. The fonts bundled with CorelDraw are no longer in the proprietary Corel format WFN, but in Type 1 PostScript fonts and TTF TrueType formats.
20 May 1993	4	1, 2, 3, 4	3, 4	3.1	Photo-Paint (for bitmap editing), CorelSHOW (for creating on-screen presentations), CorelCHART (for graphic charts), CorelMOVE for animation, Mosaic and CorelTRACE (for vectorizing bitmaps). Multi-page capabilities, Powerlines, support for graphic tablets, Clone tool, elastic node editing, Envelope tool.
27 May 1994	5	1, 2, 3, 4, 5	3, 4, 5	3.1	This is the last version which was made for Windows 3.x. Corel Ventura was included in the suite (and then sold as a separate program); it was a desktop publishing application akin to PageMaker, QuarkXPress, or (later) InDesign.
24 Aug 1995	6	3, 4, 5, 6	5, 6	Windows 95, PowerMac	This is the first version which was made for 32-bit Windows, and the first for Macintosh. New features were customizable interface, Polygon, Spiral, Knife and Eraser tools. Corel Memo, Corel Presents, Corel Motion 3D, Corel Depth, Corel Multimedia Manager, Corel Font Master and Corel DREAM (for 3D modelling) were included in the suite.
8 Oct 1996	7	3, 4, 5, 6, 7	5, 6, 7	Windows 95, NT 4, PowerMac	Context-sensitive Property bar, Print Preview with Zoom and Pan options, Scrapbook (for viewing a drag-and-dropping graphic objects), Publish to HTML option, Draft and Enhanced display options, Interactive Fill and Blend tools, Transparency tools, Natural Pen tool, Find & Replace wizard, Convert Vector to Bitmap option (inside Draw), Spell checker, Thesaurus and Grammar checker. The suite included Corel Scan and Corel Barista (a Java-based document exchange format).
27 Oct 1997	8	3, 4, 5, 6, 7, 8	6, 7, 8	95, NT 4, PowerMac	Digger selection, Docker windows, Interactive Distortion, 3D, Envelope and tools, Realistic Dropshadow tool, interactive color mixing, color palette editor, guidelines as objects, custom-sized pages, duotone support. Corel Versions was included in the suite. A free, feature-limited promotional version called CorelDRAW 8 LE was later offered for Power Macintosh.
31 Aug 1999	9	3, 4, 5, 6, 7, 8, 9	5, 6, 7, 8, 9	Windows 95, 98, NT 4, Linux	Mesh fill tool (for complex color filling), Artistic Media tool, Publish to PDF features, embedded ICC color profiles, Multiple On-screen Color Palettes and Microsoft Visual Basic for Applications 6 support. The suite included Canto Cumulus LE, a piece of software for media management. The Macintosh version was dropped in advance of the release of OS X.
13 Nov 2000	10	10^{†}	10 ^{‡}	Windows 98, Me, NT 4, 2000, OS X	Corel R.A.V.E. (for vector animation), Perfect Shapes, Web graphics tools (for creating interactive elements such as buttons), Page sorter, multilingual document support, navigator window. Open, save, import and export in SVG format.
1 Aug 2002	11	11 ^{†}	5, 6, 7, 8, 9, 10, 11	Windows 98, Me, NT 4, 2000, XP	Symbols library, image slicing (for web design), pressure-sensitive vector brushes, 3-point drawing tools.
10 Feb 2004	12	12 ^{†}	12 ^{‡}	Windows 2000, XP	Dynamic guides, Smart Drawing tools, Export to MS Office or Word option, Virtual Segment Delete tool, Unicode text support.
17 Jan 2006	X3 (13)	X3 ^{†}	7, 8, 9, 10, 11, 12, X3	Windows 2000, 2003, XP (32-bit, 64-bit), Vista (32-bit only), 7, 8	Double click Crop tool (the first vector software able to crop groups of vectors and bitmap images at the same time), Smart fill tool, Chamfer/Fillet/Scallop/Emboss tool, Image Adjustment Lab. Trace became integrated inside Draw under the name PowerTrace.
22 Jan 2008	X4 (14)	7 to X4 ^{†}	7 to X4	Windows XP, Vista, 7, 8	WhatTheFont font identification service linked inside CorelDraw, ConceptShare, Table tool, independent page layers, live text formatting, support for RAW camera files.
23 Feb 2010	X5 (15)	7 to X5	7 to X5	XP, Vista, 7, 8	Built-in content organizer (CorelConnect), CD, web graphics and animation tools, multi-core performance improvement, digital content (professional fonts, clip arts, and photos), object hinting, pixel view, enhanced Mesh tool with transparency options, added touch support, and new supported file formats. It has developed Transformation, which makes multiple copies of a single object. For the first time, OpenType versions of Helvetica, Frutiger, Futura and Garamond #3 font families (32 fonts total) from Linotype foundry are included instead of the Bitstream counterparts. All but Garamond are in OpenType Pro format. Scripting is now also permitted in Visual Studio Tools for Applications.
20 Mar 2012	X6 (16)	7 to X6	7 to X6	XP (32-bit only), Vista, 7, 8	64-bit and multi-core processor native support. Support for 64-bit Adobe Photoshop plugins. More tools to import and export from Adobe Creative Suite and Publisher. Object properties, styles, and color styling consolidated into their own docking toolbars (Dockers). A new Unicode OpenType-based text engine modernizes text handling, including full international language support (the legacy text mode is retained). Dynamic alignment guides allow for easy repositioning without setting static guidelines. CorelConnect content organizer allows for in-app access to online sources such as Flickr for image and clip art assets. New tools for pushing, pulling, smearing, etc. vector objects. Improvements in frame-based layout, masking, clipping and effects.
27 March 2014	X7 (17)	7 to X7	7 to X7	Windows 7, 8, 10*	New default workspaces for illustrators, beginners, and other user roles; new training videos. New tabbed documents can break out of main window, making multi-screen work easier. A few more retouching and fill tools, additional color harmony and QR code generating tools. New Guidelines Dockers continued the migration of tools away from dependence on pull-down menus. Corel X7 introduced 30-day and 365-day rentals (subscriptions) as an alternative to buying a perpetual license. Corel Content Exchange, an online source for fonts, fill patterns and other materials, required continuing payments for access to the full range of content.
15 March 2016	X8 (18)	7 to X8	11 to X8	7, 8, 10	Added new Font List selection filtering system; Corel Font Manager replaced Bitstream Font Navigator. Ability to hide objects and groups, not just layers. Possible to copy and paste portions of curve segments. Adjacent node selection, improved Knife tool, photo retouching Healing tool, improved perspective correction tool, improved (Gaussian) feathering on drop shadows, and automated camera effects such as bokeh and sepia. Startup and feature tours; enhanced Hints. Border and Grommet and Canvas Prep and Stretch tools for large format and commercial print applications. High-resolution displays became officially supported with new scalable icons and UI elements. First version to fully support Windows 10.
11 April 2017	2017 (19)	7 to 19	11 to 19	7, 8, 10	LiveSketch, 4K resolution and real-time stylus support, Enhanced Font list Box and nodes, Supports Microsoft Windows 10 tablet mode & Surface Dial.
10 April 2018	2018 (20)	7 to 20	11 to 20	7, 8, 10	Symmetrical Drawing Mode, Block Shadow Tool, publish to WordPress, Impact tool, Pointillizer, and PhotoCocktail, straighten photos interactively, adjust photo perspective interactively, apply envelopes to bitmaps.
12 March 2019	2019 (21)	7 to 21	11 to 21	Windows 7, 8, 10, MacOS	Object Docker, Non-Destructive Effects, Pixel-perfect Workflow, Find and replace workflow, Supports 64-bit TWAIN scanner, PDF/X Support, digital asset management, improved performance, enhanced print merge, modern templates. An online app is now included, and MacOS is supported, requiring 10.12 (Sierra) or better.
12 March 2020	2020 (22)	11 to 22	11 to 22	Windows 7, 8.1, 10, MacOS	Includes a suite of collaboration tools, including Copy editing, a Comments Docker, Annotation tools, and Cloud client sharing. Microsoft and Google GSuite sign-ons are supported. Features include new AI-assisted PowerTRACE, bitmap upsampling, and bitmap artifact compression removal; new Stylized effects such as Pastel and Woodcut; nondestructive (lens) bitmap effects; another edge-finding mask tool; improved search and replace; and sliders to adjust OpenType variable fonts (Windows only).
9 March 2021	2021 (23)	15 to 23	15 to 23	Windows 10, 11, MacOS	Includes new Perspective Drawing, Multipage View, Pages docker/inspector, Autofit Page, Adjustments docker/inspector, Replace Colors, Multi-asset export and enhanced collaboration tools. A mid-year update added a few features such as live comments and collaboration, but was offered only to subscribers.
8 March 2022	2022 (24.0-24.2)	15 to 24.0	15 to 24.0	Windows 10, 11, MacOS	Includes more non-destructive photo editing and filters, combined photo editing features with presets, new templates, a new multipage tool, and more multiple-format exports. New features are offered only to subscribers.
7 March 2023	2023 (24.3)	15 to 24.3	15 to 24.3	Windows 10, 11, or MacOS 12, 13	Includes new curve-editing tools, updated Pantone support, and bug fixes. Additional design templates were added for subscription users, while the one-time purchase option was reinstated.
5 March 2024	2024 (25)	15 to 25	15 to 25	Windows 11 or MacOS 15	Introduced pixel-based Painterly Brushes built on Corel Painter technology that can be applied to vector curves. The update also included a redesigned Effects docker/inspector for a streamlined non-destructive workflow, seamlessly integrated remote fonts, and newly added design templates.
4 March 2025	2025 (26)	15 to 26	15 to 26	Windows 11 or MacOS 15	Includes the Advanced PDF Printing feature, improvements to the Paintbrush tool, and stability and security enhancements throughout the program. In addition, access to the CorelDRAW Web online application, a version of CorelDRAW accessible from any web browser, was added to the suite.
6 March 2026	2026 (27)	15 to 27	15 to 27	Windows 11 or MacOS Tahoe	Introduces the "Artist Intelligence" concept with new generative AI tools including AI Generate, Remix Image, and AI Background Removal. Features up to 3× faster application launch times, a refreshed modern interface, and support for macOS Tahoe and Apple Silicon.

:From Windows 7, 32-bit and 64-bit supported

† CorelDraw 10 to X4 can open files of version 3 and later, but certain features may not be supported.
‡ The list of file formats that CorelDraw 10 to X4 can write may not be complete in this table.

* CorelDraw X7 on Windows 10 requires Update 5.

== Platform and scripting history ==
CorelDRAW was originally developed for Microsoft Windows 2.1, and versions existed for Windows 3.1x, CTOS, OS/2, and Power Macintosh. Hewlett-Packard announced a version of CorelDRAW for its HP 9000 Series 400 and 700 workstations running HP-UX. With the release of Corel Linux, CorelDRAW 9 was released with package support for Debian and Red Hat-based Linux. Version 11 was released for Mac OS X in 2001, but was then discontinued on both Linux and Mac. CorelDRAW was available only for Windows until the 2019 version became the first to support macOS.

As of 2021, CorelDRAW Graphics Suite supports Windows 10, Windows 11, and macOS, including a new release for Apple silicon. A related web app and iPad app offers collaboration and markup online. In 2024, a new trial version was released available directly in the browser.

=== Scripting ===
With version 6, Corel introduced task automation using a proprietary scripting language, Corel SCRIPT. Support for VBA (Visual Basic for Applications) macros was added in version 9, and Corel SCRIPT was eventually deprecated. Support for VSTA (Microsoft Visual Studio Tools for Applications) has been integrated in Windows versions since X5, and currently requires Visual Studio 2017. Version 2019 added JavaScript as an option for cross-platform scripting with MacOS support; however, the built-in IDE does not support it as of 2020.

== File format ==
CorelDraw file format
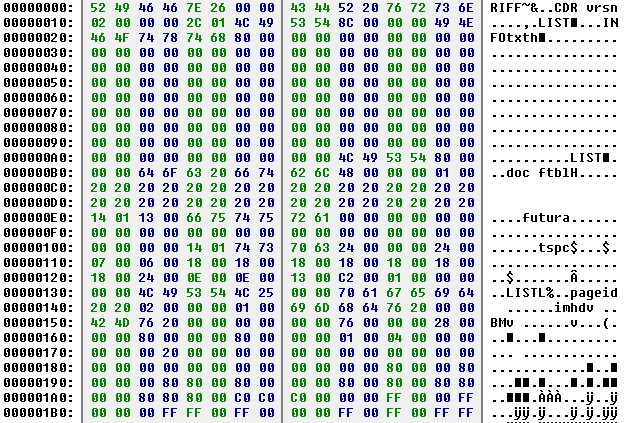
- Hex dump of the header of a CDR file as RIFF container, written with version 3
- Filename extension: .cdr
- Latest release: 2021 v23
- Open format?: no

=== Structure ===
In its first versions, the CDR file format was a completely proprietary file format primarily used for vector graphic drawings, recognizable by the first two bytes of the file being "WL". Starting with CorelDraw 3, the file format changed to a Resource Interchange File Format (RIFF) envelope, recognizable by the first four bytes of the file being "RIFF", and a "CDR*vrsn" in bytes 9 to 15, with the asterisk "*" being just a blank in early versions. Beginning with CorelDraw 4 it included the version number of the writing program in hexadecimal ("4" meaning version 4, "D" meaning version 13). The actual data chunk of the RIFF remains a Corel proprietary format.

From version X4 (14) on, the CDR file is a ZIP-compressed directory of several files, among them XML files and the RIFF-structured riffdata.cdr with the familiar version signature in versions X4 (CDREvrsn) and X5 (CDRFvrsn), and a root.dat with CorelDraw X6, where the bytes 9 to 15 look slightly different – "CDRGfver" in a file created with X6. "F" was the last valid hex digit, and the "fver" now indicates that the letter before no longer represents a hex digit.

There is no publicly available CDR file format specification.

Other CorelDraw file formats include CorelDraw Compressed (CDX), CorelDraw Template (CDT) and Corel Presentation Exchange (CMX).

=== Use of CDR files in other programs ===
In December 2006, the sK1 open-source project team started to reverse-engineer the CDR format. The results and the first working snapshot of the CDR importer were presented at the Libre Graphics Meeting 2007 conference taking place in May 2007 in Montreal (Canada). Later on the team parsed the structure of other Corel formats with the help of the open source CDR Explorer. As of 2008, the sK1 project claims to have the best import support for CorelDraw file formats among open source software programs. The sK1 project also developed the UniConvertor, a command line open source tool which supports conversion from CorelDraw ver.7-X4 formats (CDR/CDT/CCX/CDRX/CMX) to other formats. UniConvertor is also used in the Inkscape and Scribus open source projects as an external tool for importing CorelDraw files.

In 2007, Microsoft blocked CDR file format in Microsoft Office 2003 with the release of Service Pack 3 for Office 2003. Microsoft later apologized for inaccurately blaming the CDR file format and other formats for security problems in Microsoft Office and released some tools for solving this problem.

In 2012, the joint LibreOffice/re-lab team implemented libcdr, a library for reading CDR files from version 7 to X3 and CMX files. The library has extensive support for shapes and their properties, including support for color management and spot colors, and has a basic support for text. The library provides a built-in converter to SVG, and a converter to OpenDocument is provided by writerperfect package. The libcdr library is used in LibreOffice starting from version 3.6, and thanks to public API it can be freely used by other applications.

=== Other applications supporting CDR files ===
CDR file format import is partially or fully supported in following applications:

- Adobe Illustrator – CorelDraw 5, 6, 7, 8, 9, 10
- CorelCAD
- Corel PaintShop Pro
- Corel WordPerfect Office
- Inkscape - CorelDRAW versions 7 through X4
- LibreOffice using libcdr
- Macromedia FreeHand – CorelDraw 7, 8
- Microsoft Visio 2002 – CorelDraw! drawing file versions 3.0, 4.0, 5.0, 6.0 and 7.0 (.cdr), Corel Clipart (.cmx)
- sK1 – partial support
- Xara Designer Pro and Xara Photo & Graphic Designer – early versions of CorelDraw CDR and CMX

== Reception ==
MacHome Journal called the eight edition of CorelDRAW a great purchase given the price.

== See also ==
- Comparison of desktop publishing software
- List of desktop publishing software
- Comparison of vector graphics editors
- Comparison of raster-to-vector conversion software
- List of 2D graphics software
