= Pages (word processor) =

Software developed by Apple Inc.

Pages: Create Documents

- Pages 12 on macOS 11 Big Sur
- Developer: Apple
- Release: January 11, 2005
- Stable release: 15.4 / September 29, 2026; 7 days ago
- Platform: macOS 15.6 or later; iOS 18.0 or later; iPadOS 18.0 or later; visionOS 2.0 or later; Web
- Available in: 33 languages
- List of languages English, Arabic, Catalan, Croatian, Czech, Danish, Dutch, Finnish, French, German, Greek, Hebrew, Hindi, Hungarian, Indonesian, Italian, Japanese, Korean, Malay, Norwegian Bokmål, Polish, Portuguese, Romanian, Russian, Simplified Chinese, Slovak, Spanish, Swedish, Thai, Traditional Chinese, Turkish, Ukrainian, Vietnamese
- Type: Word processor
- License: Proprietary freeware
- Website: apple.com/pages

Pages, officially Pages: Create Documents, is a word processing program developed by Apple that is part of the iWork productivity suite. It runs on the macOS, iPadOS, and iOS operating systems and is also available on the iCloud website. The first version of Pages was released in February 2005. Pages is marketed by Apple as an easy-to-use application that allows users to quickly create documents on their devices. Many Apple-designed templates comprising different themes (such as letters, résumés, posters, and outlines) are included with Pages.

== History ==
On January 11, 2005, Apple announced the first version of Pages, as part of iWork '05. On January 6, 2009, Apple released the fourth version of Pages as a component of iWork '09. On January 27, 2010, Apple announced a new version of Pages for iPad with a touch interface. On May 31, 2011, Apple updated the iOS version of Pages to 1.4, providing it as a universal binary, which allowed the app to be run on iPhones and iPod Touch devices, in addition to iPads. On October 12, 2011, Apple updated the iOS app to version 1.5, adding the iCloud "Documents in the Cloud" feature. iOS Pages was updated to version 1.6 on March 7, 2012, and will only run on iOS 5.1 or later. Pages for OS X was updated to version 4.3 on December 4, 2012, to support Pages 1.7 for iOS, which was released on the same day. Pages for iOS 1.7.1 introduced better compatibility with Word and Pages for Mac, and version 1.7.2, released on March 7, 2013, merely added stability improvements and bug fixes.

On October 23, 2013, Apple released a redesign with Pages 5.0 and made it free for anyone with an iOS device. In this release, many templates, as well as some advanced features that were available in version 4.3, were not included. Some of these missing features were put back over subsequent releases, but the current release still lacks features from version 4.3, including the ability to select non-contiguous regions of text, advanced find/replace functions, and more.

As part of the launch of Apple Creator Studio on January 28, 2026, version 15.1 of Pages for macOS was released as a new app rather than an update to the existing app, which will no longer receive any new features. The iOS and iPadOS versions were unaffected by this and received the update as normal. As part of this, the application moved to a freemium model, with everything remaining free except for the newly added advanced editing features, which require an Apple Creator Studio subscription.

== Features ==
Pages is a word processor and page layout application. When Pages is opened, users are presented with a document Open window with a "New Document" button. The "New Document" button opens a template chooser which allows them to start with a blank document or with a predesigned template — including a basic, report, letter, résumé, envelope, business card, flyers & posters, cards, miscellaneous and a newsletter section of templates — that contains placeholder text and images which can be replaced by dragging and dropping photos from the Media Browser. The Media Browser provides quick access to media from iTunes, iMovie, and Photos. Users can drag and drop music, movies, and photos directly into Pages documents from the Media Browser window.

Each document window contains a toolbar, which gives one-click access to commonly used functions such as inserting objects (text boxes, shapes, tables, charts, and comments), uploading the document to iWork.com, and adding additional pages. In addition, the document window contains a contextual format bar that allows one-click formatting of text and adjustments to images. When text is selected, the format bar enables users to choose fonts, text size, and color, and to adjust line spacing and alignment. When an image is selected, the format bar displays tools to adjust opacity, show and hide shadow and reflection effects, and mask the image. A separate Inspector window provides almost all formatting options available for any element in the open document.

Beginning in iWork '08, word processing and page layout are two distinct modes. In word processing mode, Pages supports headers and footers, footnotes and outlining, and list creation. Users can collaborate with others on a document. Pages tracks changes by users by displaying each person's edits in different colors. Users can also add comments alongside the document. In page layout mode, users have complete control over the position of objects on the page. Images and text can be placed anywhere on the canvas.

Pages used to feature several other advanced writing tools. Many of these have been stripped out of the current version. The "Full Screen" mode (introduced in Mac OS X Lion) and supported in Pages 4.1 hid the menubar and toolbars, allowing users to focus on a single document without being distracted by other windows on the screen; however, after Pages 5, full-screen mode requires the user to manually hide various panes for focused writing and the page thumbnails pane does not automatically open when the cursor is moved to the left screen edge. Earlier versions featured mail merge, which automatically populated custom fields with contact data from the Address Book or Numbers apps to create personalized documents. For example, if a user wanted to send one letter to three people, mail merge allowed the user to create a single document with placeholder fields that were populated when printing. The mail merge feature was completely removed in version 5 and it did not return until version 12.1. Tables and charts pasted from Numbers are automatically updated if the original spreadsheet is changed.

== Compatibility ==
=== Other formats in Pages ===
Pages can import some Microsoft Word documents (including Word 2007's Office Open XML format). As of September 2026, Pages does not support OpenDocument file format.

Pages 4 and earlier could also import AppleWorks word processing documents.

Simple and complex mathematical equations can be written for a Pages document with macOS's Grapher, offering similar capabilities to Microsoft Equation Editor (plus 2D and 3D rendering tools only Grapher can use).

=== Exporting from Pages ===
Pages can also export documents into several formats; formatting is generally retained during the export process. Pages 4 and earlier could export documents to rich text, but those features were removed in Pages 5.0 and not restored until Pages 6.1. Pages 5 can still export files in PDF, EPUB, and Microsoft Word DOC formats.

=== Pages format in other software ===
The only software other than Pages that can edit its files is Apple's iWork productivity suite through Apple's iCloud, though Windows, macOS and iOS users can view pages files via LibreOffice and Jumpshare. LibreOffice's built-in conversion tool has a limited ability to import pages files to allow editting, but while text is retained, other elements (like styles, animations, fonts and tables) may not be transferred perfectly.

The iCloud system can also convert Pages files to Microsoft Word format for accessibility outside the Apple environment.

Some content can be retrieved from a document created in Pages '09 because a .pages file is a bundle. A user can open a .pages file in an unpackaging program or by renaming files as .zip files in Windows (XP and onwards) and will find either a .jpg or .pdf preview in its entirety for viewing and printing, although this is only possible if the creator of the .pages files elected to include a preview (by default, this feature is left on). The user will also find a .xml file with unformatted text. This process can also be used for users of the 2008 version of Pages to open documents saved in the 2009 version of Pages, which are not backward compatible.

== Version history ==
Version number	Release date	Changes
1.0	January 11, 2005	Initial release.
1.0.1	March 17, 2005	Fixes isolated bugs and issues causing problems for some customers. It also allowed the deletion of template pages.
1.0.2	May 25, 2005	Addresses issues with page navigation and organization.
2.0	January 10, 2006	Released as part of iWork '06. Includes new templates, table calculations, photo masking with shapes, and freestyle Bézier curves.
2.0.1	April 26, 2006	Pages 2.0.1 addresses issues with charts and image adjustments. It also addresses several other minor issues.
2.0.1v2	May 1, 2006	Pages 2.0.1v2 addresses issues with charts and image adjustments. It also addresses several other minor issues.
2.0.2	September 28, 2006	Pages 2.0.2 addresses issues with Aperture compatibility.
3.0	August 7, 2007	Pages 3.0 was released as part of iWork '08. It introduces compatibility with Office Open XML (Microsoft Office 2007) files. Introduced Change Tracking. Transparency tool for pictures. Pages 3.0 needs only a third (260 MB) of the hard disk space required for Pages 2.0 (760 MB) despite the added functionality.
3.0.1	September 27, 2007	Addresses issues with performance and change tracking.
3.0.2	January 29, 2008	This update addresses compatibility with Mac OS X.
3.0.3	February 2, 2008	Compatibility issues.
4.0	January 6, 2009	Released as part of iWork '09. New features include the ability to edit in a full-screen view, better compatibility with Microsoft Office, an outline mode, the option to upload documents to the new iWork.com service, and expanded configurability for the "track changes" feature (including the option to turn off change balloons while keeping comment balloons visible).
4.0.1	March 26, 2009	Improves reliability when working with EndNote X2 or MathType 6, or deleting Pages files.
4.0.2	May 28, 2009	Improves reliability when saving documents.
4.0.3	September 28, 2009	Improves reliability with full-screen mode, applying transparency to images, and EndNote citations.
4.0.4	August 26, 2010	Adds support for exporting to the EPUB format (for use with iBooks) and fixes problems with tables.
4.0.5	January 5, 2011	Improves the readability of exported EPUB documents.
4.1	July 20, 2011	Adds support for Mac OS X Lion, including Full-Screen, Resume, Auto Save, Versions, and Character picker. Improves Microsoft Office Compatibility.
4.2	July 25, 2012	Adds support for OS X Mountain Lion and storing documents in iCloud.
4.3	December 4, 2012	Adds support for iWork for iOS 1.7 apps.
5.0	October 22, 2013	Adds online collaboration across Macs and iOS devices as well as over the web via iCloud.com. Removes many advanced features, including mail merge, text box linking, default zoom setting, book format, page count, bookmarks, images in tables, and the ability to read/export RTF files.
5.0.1	November 21, 2013	Adds the ability to customize the toolbar with your most important tools. Stability improvements and bug fixes.
5.1	January 24, 2014	Adds back vertical ruler and a few other features. Stability improvements and bug fixes.
5.2	April 1, 2014	Adds "view only" option for sharing via iCloud. Improved support for bi-directional languages such as Hebrew and Arabic. Improved Instant Alpha, text boxes, EPUB exporting, and AppleScript support.
5.2.2	August 21, 2014	Stability improvements and bug fixes.
5.5.1	November 6, 2014	Stability improvements and bug fixes.
5.5.2	January 8, 2015	Stability improvements and bug fixes.
5.5.3	April 21, 2015	Stability improvements and bug fixes.
5.6	October 15, 2015	Enhancements for OS X El Capitan, stability improvements, and bug fixes.
5.6.1	November 11, 2015	Stability improvements and bug fixes.
5.6.2	May 10, 2016	Stability improvements and bug fixes.
6.0	September 20, 2016	Updated for macOS Sierra, including real-time Collaboration (Beta), support for Pages '05 documents, and added tabs to open multiple documents in one window.
6.0.5	October 27, 2016	Support for the Touch Bar on the 2016 MacBook Pro, and stability and performance improvements.
6.1	March 27, 2017	Superscript/subscript formatting support, LaTeX and MathML equation support, Touch ID support, import/export support for RTF, ligature support, and customizable date/time/currency support.
6.2	June 13, 2017	Updated alongside Numbers and Keynote with a new shape library, comment reply support, and "Auto-Correction" preferences pane. New Pages-specific features include linked text boxes and the ability to create EPUB fixed layout files.
6.3.1	November 17, 2017	Improved PDF export to view a document's table of contents in the sidebar in Preview and other PDF viewer apps. Drag and drop rows in tables that span multiple pages.
7.0	March 27, 2018	Make digital books using new book templates. Collaborate in real-time on documents stored in Box (requires macOS High Sierra). View pages side by side as you work. Turn on facing pages to format your document as two-page spreads. Add an image gallery to view a collection of photos on the same page. Create master pages to keep the design consistent across your page layout document. Use donut charts to visualize data. Adds a variety of new editable shapes. Additional options for reducing the file size of documents. New option to automatically format fractions as you type.
7.0.1	May 3, 2018	Stability and performance improvements.
7.1	June 18, 2018	Track text changes in shapes and text boxes. Add colors and images to backgrounds in page layout documents. Rounded corners on columns and bars for charts. Add mathematical equations to page layout documents using LaTeX or MathML notation. A variety of new editable shapes. Improved support for Arabic and Hebrew.
7.2	September 17, 2018	Record, edit and play audio right on a page. "Dark Mode" support. Continuity Camera allows you to take a photo or scan a document with an iPhone or iPad and it automatically appears in the document. Requires macOS Mojave.
7.3	November 7, 2018	Publish books directly to Apple Books for download or purchase.
8.0	March 28, 2019	Use the new table-of-contents view to easily navigate a document or book. Automatically sync custom shapes and templates to all devices using iCloud. Add alignment guides to master pages to help with layout. Improved performance while collaborating on documents. Insert tables of contents and edit grouped objects while collaborating. In Chinese, Japanese, and Korean, one can now type vertically in the entire document or an individual text box.
8.1	June 25, 2019	Style text by filling it with gradients or images, or by applying new outline styles. Copy and paste pages or sections between documents. Create links from text to other pages in a page layout document. Place images, shapes, and equations inline in text boxes so they move with the text. Using face detection, subjects in photos are intelligently positioned in placeholders and objects. Reapply a master page so text and media placeholders return to their default style and position. Create books using new templates for novels (available in English only).
8.2	September 30, 2019	Set the default font and font size used for all new documents created from basic templates. Jump to a specific page in your document using a new menu command. Add HEVC-formatted movies to documents, enabling reduced file size while preserving visual quality.
10.0	March 31, 2020	New templates (Select from a variety of new templates). Cloud Drive folder sharing. Drop caps: Add a drop cap to make a paragraph stand out with a large, decorative first letter. Apply a color, gradient, or image to the background of any document. Easily access your recently used templates in a redesigned template chooser. Print or export a PDF of your document with comments included. Edit shared documents while offline and your changes will upload when you're back online. Enhance your documents with a variety of new, editable shapes.
10.1	July 9, 2020	Play YouTube and Vimeo videos right in documents. Add captions and titles to images, videos, shapes, and other objects. Create more flexible formulas using new functions. Import an iBooks Author book to work on it in Pages.
10.2	September 22, 2020	Select from new report templates to help get started. Enhance documents with a variety of new, editable shapes. Requires macOS Catalina.
11.1	June 1, 2021	Supports adding links to web pages, email addresses, and phone numbers from objects such as shapes, lines, images, drawings, or text boxes. Teachers using the Schoolwork app to assign activities in Pages can now view students' progress, including word count and time spent.
11.2	September 28, 2021	Ability to publish books with 2-page spreads, optimized images, and more flexible versioning. Instant translation for up to 11 languages on a document. More flexible collaboration to allow participants to add others to a shared document. Create new documents from the app icon in the Dock. New Radar charts. Requires macOS Big Sur.
12.0	April 7, 2022	Added Shortcuts support on macOS Monterey. Updated icon for iOS and iPadOS. Ability to publish to Apple Books with file sizes up to 2GB. The ability to read comments and track changes using VoiceOver.
12.1	June 21, 2022	Re-introduced enhanced mail merge capabilities (that were removed in version 5.0). Added the ability to export a Pages document to plaintext format. New templates for event invitations and certificates.
12.2	October 25, 2022	Added activity view showing recent changes in collaborative documents. Share and see changes to a collaborative document in Messages (requires iOS 16, iPadOS 16 or macOS Ventura). New Blank Layout template to freely arrange text and graphics. Automatically remove an image's background to isolate its subject (requires iOS 16, iPadOS 16 or macOS Ventura).
13.0	March 30, 2023	Supports exporting and sending a document in a different format from the Share menu. Report, note-taking, letter and résumé templates include placeholder text with instructions. Adds support for Apple Pencil hover on compatible iPads.
13.1	June 13, 2023	Supports starting writing in Notes, then opening the selected note in Pages with powerful design and layout features. Supported on: MacOS, iOS & iPadOS.
13.2	September 21, 2023	Supports adding 3D stickers, regular stickers, inline word predictions for text as you type, beginning collaborating automatically on a FaceTime call, finding document suggestions in the Spotlight search bar, new minimalist report feature making it easier to decorate the page, styling borders with new colors and options for the border, removing external borders from documents and charts from Microsoft Office. Requires: macOS Ventura or later, iOS 16 or later and iPadOS 16 or later.
14.0	April 15, 2024	Supporting: Selecting multiple non-contiguous (non-adjacent) words or portions of text using the Command key. You can use non-contiguous text selection to easily perform the same action — such as change the text or paragraph formatting — on specific selections throughout your document. Requires: macOS Ventura or later, iOS 16 or later and iPadOS 16 or later.
14.1	June 10, 2024	Get inline predictions that complete the word or phrase you're typing.
14.2	September 17, 2024	Bug fixes and performance improvements
14.3	December 12, 2024	Added Apple Intelligence integration: Proofread, rewrite, summarize, and compose text for your document with Writing Tools. Create fun, original images for your document with Image Playground. Siri can use ChatGPT to answer questions about content in your document.
14.4	April 3, 2025	Make text edits using Writing Tools directly in your document (requires Apple Intelligence). Add additional pages to a word processing document more easily. Export documents to other formats using Shortcuts.
14.5	January 28, 2026	Bug fixes and performance improvements (macOS only)
15.1	January 28, 2026	Now part of Apple Creator Studio. Adds a number of features exclusive to Apple Creator Studio subscribers: new professionally-designed templates; high-quality photos and graphics, as well as new Apple-curated content in the Content Hub; create and edit images in a document and restyle with AI; increase clarity and detail of images with Super Resolution; and collaborate with larger files shared on iCloud. New design with Liquid Glass. Adds new editable shapes. Optimized for the new menu bar in iPadOS 26.

== See also ==
- List of word processors
- Comparison of word processors
- Comparison of desktop publishing software
- List of desktop publishing software
- Apple iWork
