= Noori Nastaliq =

Typeface family

- Category: Urdu Typesetting
- Designer: Ahmed Mirza Jamil
- Date released: 1981

Noori Nastaliq is a Nastaliq font widely used in Pakistan, Iran, India and Afghanistan. It was first created as a digital font in 1981 as the collaboration between Ahmed Mirza Jamil and Monotype Imaging.

In 1982, the Government of Pakistan named the nastaleeq as an "Invention of National Importance". Daily Jang is a user of the nastaliq.

In 1995, Concept Software Pvt Ltd had an agreement with Monotype Imaging to bring Jameel Noori Nastatleeq to a common man on a MS Windows based PC system through their proprietary Page Layout application called InPage.
