= Ahmed Mirza Jamil =

Pakistani calligrapher

- Born: Ahmed Mirza Jamil; 21 February 1921
- Died: 17 February 2014 (aged 92)
- Occupations: Printing press operator, Calligrapher
- Known for: Creation of Noori Nastaliq font of Urdu language
- Awards: Tamgha-e-Imtiaz (Medal of Distinction) by the Government of Pakistan (1982); Doctor of Letters, Honoris Causa degree awarded by the University of Karachi in recognition of his achievement

Ahmed Mirza Jamil (Urdu: احمد مرزا جمیل; 21 February 1921 – 17 February 2014) was a Pakistani calligrapher best known for creation of Noori Nastaliq style of Nastaliq, which was first created as a digital typeface (font, Noori Nastaliq) in 1981.

== Awards and recognition ==
- Tamgha-e-Imtiaz (Medal of Distinction) Award by the Pakistani government (1982) for his 'Invention of National Importance'.
- Doctor of Letters, Honoris Causa degree awarded by the University of Karachi in recognition of his achievement.

== Books ==
He also wrote a book, 'Revolution in Pakistani Composing' in which he describes the history of his achievement. This is a direct quote from his above book, "In future, Urdu authors will be able to compose their books like the authors of the languages of Roman script. Now, the day a manuscript is ready is the day the publication is ready for printing."

== Death ==
Ahmed Mirza Jamil died on 17 February 2014 at age 92 in Karachi, Pakistan.

== See also ==
- InPage
- Nastaʿlīq script
