= Diffuse correlation spectrometry =

Medical imaging and optical technique

Diffuse correlation spectroscopy (DCS) is a type of medical imaging and optical technique that utilizes near-infrared light to directly and non-invasively measure tissue blood flow. The imaging modality was created by David Boas and Arjun Yodh in 1995.

Blood flow is one the most important factors affecting the delivery of oxygen and other nutrients to tissues. Abnormal blood flow is associated with many diseases such as stroke and cancer. Tumors from cancer can generate abnormal tumor blood flow compared to the surrounding tissue. Current treatments attempt to decrease blood flow to cancer cells. Therefore, there is an urgent need for a way to measure blood flow. However, blood flow is difficult to measure because of sensitivity and stability of the measurement as it depends on magnitude of flow, location, and the diameter of individual vessels.

Current imaging modalities used to measure blood flow include Doppler ultrasound, PET, and MRI. Doppler ultrasound is limited to large vessels. PET requires arterial blood sampling and exposure to ionizing radiation. MRI cannot be used for patients with pacemakers and those with metal implants. All together, these imaging modalities have large and costly instrumentation and are not conducive to continuous measurements.

With these considerations in mind, the first methodology used to measure blood flow is near-infrared spectroscopy (NIRS). It is based on a well known spectral window that exists in the near-infrared (NIR, 700-900 nm) where tissue absorption is relatively low so that light can penetrate into deep/thick volumes of tissue, up to several centimeters. It provides a fast and portable alternative to measure deep tissue hemodynamics. However, it has a poor spatial resolution and is a 'static' method. This means that it measures the relatively slow variation in tissue absorption and scattering. In other words, it measures the changes in the amount of scattering rather than the motion of the scatter.

This led to the 'dynamic' NIRS technique or Diffuse correlation spectroscopy. It measures the motions of the scatters while also maintaining the advantages of NIRS. The primary moving scatterers are red blood cells. The main advantages of this method is no ionizing radiation, no contrast agents, high temporal resolution, and large penetration depth. The utility of DCS technology has been demonstrated in tumors, brains, and skeletal muscles. The general approach with DCS is that the temporal statistics of the fluctuations of the scattered light within a speckle area or pixel is monitored. Then, the electric field temporal autocorrelation function is measured. A model for photon propagation through tissues, the measured autocorrelation signal is used to determine the motion of blood flow.

== Mathematical principles ==
Diffuse correlation spectrometry is an extension of single-scattering dynamic light scattering (DLS). Single-scattering theory becomes inadequate as multiple scattering effects take place in biological thick tissues. Therefore, each scattering event contributes to the decay of the correlation function. The fields from individual photon paths are assumed to be uncorrelated; therefore, the total field autocorrelation function can be expressed as the weighted sum of the field autocorrelation function from each photon path.

The physical effect that makes the blood flow measurement possible is the temporal electric field autocorrelation function, shown in equation 1, diffuses through tissue in a manner that is similar to the light fluence rate.

$\langle E^*(r,t)\cdot E(t,\tau) \rangle (1)$

In a highly scattering media, the photon fluence rate obeys the time-dependent diffusion equation, shown in equation 2. Optical imaging variables used in these equation are here.

$\nabla \cdot (D\nabla\phi(r,t)) - \nu\mu_a\phi(r,t) + \nu S(r,t) = {\partial \phi(r,t) \over\partial t} (2)$

The blood flow measurement can be governed by the diffusion equation. Many tissue optical properties that affect diffusion such as tissue absorption and tissue reduced scattering coefficient are the same for temporal autocorrelation.

Using the same set of approximations, the temporal field autocorrelation function obeys a formally similar diffusion equation, shown in equation 3.

$[\nabla \cdot D(r) \nabla - \nu \mu_a(r) - \frac{\alpha}{3} \nu \mu_s^' k_o^2 \langle \Delta r^2(\tau)\rangle]G_1(r,\tau) = -\nu S(r)~(3)$

The mean-square particle displacement has been found to be reasonably well approximated as an "effective" Brownian motion, i.e., D_{B} represents the effective diffusion coefficient of the moving scatterers. In order to estimate relative blood flow from DCS data, we fit the measured intensity autocorrelation functions to solutions of the equation in equation 3. Currently, there is no evidence explaining why Brownian-motion correlation curves work effectively. This is the current empirical approach. The unit of αD_{B} (cm^{2}/s) has been found to correlate well with other blood flow measurement modalities and is used to measure blood flow. Therefore, is the blood flow index (BFI). To calculate the relative blood flow (rBF), the equation is shown in equation 4 where BFI_{0} is the DCS blood flow measurement at a baseline.

$rBF = \frac{BFI}{BFI_0} ~ (4)$

== Instrumentation and data acquisition ==
The instrumentation needed in order to conduct the data acquisition include a multimode optical fiber, single-mode or few-mode fibers, photon-counting avalanche photodiodes (APDs), multi-tau correlator board, and a computer.

The first step of data acquisition is probing the tissue with multimode optical fibers that deliver a long coherence length laser light to the tissue. The second step of data acquisition is collecting photons emitted from the tissue surface with single-mode or few-mode fibers. The third step of data acquisition is the APDs detect the photons from the single-mode or few-mode fibers. The APDs act like detectors. The APDs will have a transistor-transistor logic output or binary outputs with the use of transistors. These outputs will be fed into the multi-tau correlator board which will calculate the temporal intensity auto-correlation functions of the detected signal. Then, the function outputs onto the computer where the functions are fitted to the diffusion equation in the previous section in order to determine optical properties about the tissue as well as properties of the scatters or red blood cells such as blood flow index and many more.

== Application Example ==
A clinical application of DCS is for use in diagnosis of cancers. An example of this is measuring red blood cell flow in breast tumors. In this experiment, both healthy patients and patients with breast tumors were recruited. Researchers scanned the tumor with a hand-held optical probe with 4 sources and detectors 2.5 cm apart from each other. Then, the resultant correlation functions were fit to the solution of the correlation diffusion equation to obtain the blood flow index. The average relative blood flow was reported at each position. Blood flow increased in both horizontal and vertical scans as the probe crossed over the tumor. These findings were consistent with previous Doppler ultrasound and PET results.

== Advantages, limitations, and future directions ==
Diffuse correlation spectrometry measures the motion of scatters or red blood cells in tissue by analyzing the intensity of autocorrelation functions.

There are many advantages to this method. The first advantage is that DCS can be used for patients of all ages. This is significant as some modalities such as MRI are difficult to use for certain populations. The second advantage is that DCS instrumentation is easy to assemble and requires only one wavelength that can be chosen. The third advantage is that the theoretical concepts of DCS can be adapted to other blood flow imaging techniques.

However, there are limitations associated with DCS. First, the reason for why the dynamics of RBCs are so well approximated by a Brownian motion flow model is still not clear. Second, motion artifacts are common and can generate signals that can mislead physiological interpretation. Third, on the instrumentation side, the low SNR levels due to small fibers and tissues are challenging.

Next steps for DCS include using this modality as a bedside monitor of cerebral perfusion. Furthermore, DCS should be used to increase our understanding of early brain development. The ability to monitor neurovascular responses will enable the use of more complex stimulation paradigms.
