= Dark current spectroscopy =

Dark current spectroscopy is a technique that is used to determine contaminants in silicon.
