= Drobe =

Computing news web site with a focus on the RISC OS operating system

- Available in: English
- Owner: Chris Williams
- Creator: Peter Price
- Website: drobe.co.uk
- Commercial: No
- Registration: Optional
- Launched: October 1999; 26 years ago
- Current status: Offline
- Content license: CC BY-NC-SA

Drobe (also referred to as Drobe Launchpad) was a computing news web site with a focus on the RISC OS operating system. Its archived material was retained online, curated by editor Chris Williams until late 2020.

== History ==
Drobe was founded in 1999 by Peter Price. In 2001, Peter handed the site over to Chris Williams as editor. After 10 years, it closed as a news site in 2009. It was retained as an historical archive until 2020 when the site went offline. A few weeks after the site's closure Williams posted articles on Micro Men, the television drama about the rivalry between Acorn and Sinclair in the 1980s. He subsequently stated that such articles may continue to appear periodically.

== Main features ==
At launch, the site featured a news feed, POP email checker and a search facility "incorporating AcornSearch.com". As of 2013, the site features archived RISC OS articles, news and other media. It also hosts an online emulator for the BBC Micro, using the Java Runtime Environment.

Registered users were able to apply for user webspace in order to host their own projects. These subsites continue to be hosted by Drobe.

== See also ==
- The Icon Bar

== Subsites ==
=== Drobe ===
- BBC Micro emulator
- File archives (mirrors of popular FTP sites, etc.)
- Reference material (various RISC OS/Acorn hardware)

=== Selected user sites ===
- alanb.drobe.co.uk
- adrianl.drobe.co.uk
- jeffd.drobe.co.uk
- stoppers.drobe.co.uk (ROLF (software), the RISC OS look and feel on Linux)
