= Ligature =

Ligature may refer to:

== Language ==
- Ligature (writing), a combination of two or more letters into a single symbol (typography and calligraphy)
- Ligature (grammar), a morpheme that links two words

== Medicine ==
- Ligature (medicine), a piece of suture used to shut off a blood vessel or other anatomical structure
  - Ligature (orthodontic), used in dentistry

== Music ==
- Ligature (music), an element of musical notation used especially in the medieval and Renaissance periods
- Ligature (instrument), a device used to attach a reed to the mouthpiece of a woodwind instrument

== See also ==
- Ligature strangulation
