= Calamus (software) =

Desktop publishing application

- Developer(s): invers Software
- Final release: 2015 R4 / April 9, 2017; 8 years ago
- Operating system: Atari TOS, Microsoft Windows
- Available in: 6 languages
- List of languages English, Czech, Dutch, French, German, Norwegian
- Type: Desktop publishing
- License: Trialware
- Website: calamus.net

Calamus is a desktop publishing application, originally built for the Atari ST computer. The first version was released on July 1, 1987, by the former German software company DMC GmbH.

Calamus is a software RIP application which generates high-quality output in any resolution. It was one of the first DTP applications supporting an own vector font format, notable for its support for automatic kerning even where adjacent characters are set in different fonts or at different sizes. Its high modularity offers features for almost every purpose in desktop publishing. Calamus also was one of the first DTP apps to support real virtual objects and frames, nondestructive vector masks, and editable PS/PDF import. Its (adjustable) measurement base of 1/10,000mm allows accurate positioning of elements.

Calamus was ported to Windows by MGI Software and was released as Calamus 95. In 1997, distribution rights for the program were taken over by the German company invers Software, which sold the program and developed new versions for the next two decades. In March 2018, invers Software was closed, and sales and development of Calamus were discontinued, although the official website is still functioning as of 2022.

The current and last version of Calamus is Calamus SL 2015, also available as SLC 2015 (complete edition with all additional modules) and LE 2015 (lite edition with restricted number of modules).

== Raster Image Processor ==
Calamus is a RIP itself and handles various, adjustable raster dot sizes at the same time. It handles rasterization information per document, page or even per frame. It also uses a unique, notable method of cutting raster dots, which means that a screen raster can be cropped or clipped at certain borders, given by the document layout elements. Thus, it does not require any external RIP for interpretation, rendering and screening of documents. Using a special module, Calamus supports dot rasterization (using the term Star Screening) which is a frequency modulated method of halftoning (Stochastic screening).

== Calamus Intelligent Kerning ==
Kerning in Calamus works with sets of left and right bounds measured at different heights for each glyph

Rather than using kerning pairs or relying on simple side-bearing measurements, Calamus’ native fonts encode left and right bounds for each character at eight different latitudes. Unlike the kerning information in other formats, the resulting jigsaw-pieces can be used to fit characters together, even if those characters are from different fonts or if they are set at different sizes.

In contrast, the kerning implementation in OpenType and TrueType only works when adjacent characters are part of the same font, which can result in character collisions or poor kerning in some instances. The alternative is to use optical kerning, where the shapes of the characters are analysed to determine the appropriate distances; Calamus’ approach might be regarded as a simplification of that, working with a low-resolution version of the final character.

== See also ==
- iCalamus
- Atari ST character set
