= Desktop Color Separations =

Encapsulated PostScript file format

Desktop Colour Separation (DCS) is an enhanced Encapsulated PostScript file format that was introduced by Quark, Inc. It is now primarily used for specialised graphics work particularly images that use multiple channels, e.g. when applying different spot colours to each part of a greyscale image.

== Format ==
In DCS a CMYK graphic is separated into five files; a main file and four pre-separation files, one for each CMYK process colour. The main file contains an indication of which separation files are needed and where to find them, together with a composite image information which is used to print a composite of the image.

== Operation ==
When output to a PostScript printer, the printer driver reads the information in the main file and assigns the cyan, magenta, yellow, and black files to their corresponding separation files.
