= Comparison of desktop publishing software =

The following is a comparison of major desktop publishing software.

== Overview ==
This table provides general software information including the developer, latest stable version, the year in which the software was first released, and the license under which it is available.

Desktop publishing software	Developer(s)	Latest stable version	Initial release	License
Affinity Publisher	Serif Europe	2.3.0 30 November 2023; 2 years ago	2019	Proprietary
Apache OpenOffice Writer	Apache Software Foundation and others	4.1.16 10 November 2025; 10 months ago	2002	Apache License 2.0 (Apache OpenOffice 3.4 and later)
Canva	Canva Pty Ltd	Rolling updates	2013	Proprietary SaaS
Collabora Online	Collabora	26.04.3.3 14 September 2026; 14 days ago	2016	MPL-2.0 and others
CorelDRAW	Corel	24.5 September 18, 2023; 3 years ago	1989	Proprietary
InDesign	Adobe	CC 2024 20.0 October 2024; 1 year ago	1999	Proprietary Trialware
LibreOffice Draw	The Document Foundation	26.8 26 August 2026; 33 days ago	2011	LGPL v3
LyX	The LyX Team	2.5.1 23 April 2026; 5 months ago	1995	GPL v2
Marq	Draper	Rolling updates	2013	Proprietary SaaS
Microsoft Publisher	Microsoft Corporation	2021 October 5, 2021; 4 years ago	1991	Proprietary Trialware
Pages	Apple Inc.	13.2 September 21, 2023; 3 years ago	2005	Proprietary
QuarkXPress	Quark, Inc.	2024 20.0.0 November 14, 2023; 2 years ago	1987	Proprietary
Scribus	The Scribus Team	1.6.4 20 April 2025; 17 months ago	2003	GPL
Superprint	2.13	1.7	2026	Proprietary
The Print Shop	Broderbund	23.1 2009; 17 years ago (Note: release date not stated on vendors web page)	1984	Proprietary
Desktop publishing software	Developer(s)	Latest stable version	Initial release	License

== Support by platform ==
This table shows which platforms (operating systems and web) the latest version of each application is compatible with. Key to values:

- No means that no version for this platform exists.
- Partial means that the application for this platform lacks important functionality or is still being developed.
- Beta means that only a pre-market version of the application is available for this platform.
- Yes means that the application has been officially released in a fully functional, stable version.
- Dropped means that new versions have been discontinued for this platform; the number in parentheses is the last known stable version which was officially released for that platform.

Application names that are on a light purple background are discontinued.

Desktop publishing software	Android	ChromeOS	iOS	iPadOS	Linux	MacOS	Windows	Web, Online, Cloud	Other OS
Affinity Publisher	No	No	No	Yes	No	Yes	Yes	No	No
Apache OpenOffice Writer	No	No	No	No	Yes	Yes (Note: Rosetta 2 emulation is required to run on all current Apple macOS hardware which use Apple silicon (M1, M2, M3...). Native CPU support remains for previous Intel based macOS devives.)	Yes	No	Yes (Note: Build your own application from source code) (Note: unsupported)
Canva	Yes (Note: not supported on mobile web browsers.) (App and Online)	Yes (App and Online)	Yes (App and Online)	Yes (App and Online)	Yes	Yes (App and Online)	Yes (App and Online)	Yes	No
Collabora Online	Yes (App and Online)	Yes (App and Online)	Yes (App and Online)	Yes (App and Online)	Yes (App and Online)	Yes (App and Online)	Yes (App and Online)	Yes	Yes (Note: Online or Build your own application from source code)
CorelDRAW	No	No	No	No	No	Yes	Yes	No	No
InDesign	No	No	No	No	No	Yes	Yes	No	No
LibreOffice	No	Yes	No	No	Yes	Yes	Yes	No	Yes
LyX	No	Yes	No	No	Yes	Yes	Yes	No	OS/2, Haiku
Marq	Yes (Online)	Yes (Online)	Yes (Online)	Yes (Online)	Yes (Online)	Yes (Online)	Yes (Online)	Yes	No
Microsoft Publisher	No	No	No	No	No	No	Yes	No	No
Pages	No	No	Yes	Yes	No	Yes	No	No	No
QuarkXPress	No	No	No	No	No	Yes	Yes	No	No
Scribus	No	Yes	No	No	Yes	Yes	Yes	No	OS/2 Warp 4, ArcaOS, eComStation, OpenIndiana, Solaris, Haiku
The Print Shop	No	No	No	No	No	No	Yes	No	No
Desktop publishing software	Android	ChromeOS	iOS	iPadOS	Linux	MacOS	Windows	Web, Online, Cloud	Other OS

== Input format ==
This table gives a comparison of the file formats that can be opened or imported.

Desktop publishing software	PDF	EPS	SVG	HTML	OpenDocument ODT	Microsoft DOCX	Other
Affinity Publisher	Yes	Yes	No	No	No	Yes	Yes
Apache OpenOffice Writer	No	Yes	No	No	Yes	No	Yes
Canva	Yes	Yes	Yes	No	No	Yes	PNG, WebP, audio, video, fonts, others
Collabora Online	Yes	Yes	Yes	No	Yes	Yes	PUB, TeX/LaTeX, WebP, others
CorelDRAW	Yes	Yes	Yes	No	No	Yes	others
InDesign	Yes	Yes	Yes	Yes	No	Yes	WebP, others
LibreOffice	Yes	Yes	Yes	Yes	Yes	Yes	PUB, WPD, TeX/LaTeX, RTF, others
LyX	No	No	No	Yes	No	No	CSV, TeX/LaTeX, others
Marq	Yes	No	No	No	No	No	PNG
Microsoft Publisher	No	No	Yes	Yes	No	Yes	RTF
Pages	No	No	No	No	No	Yes	RTF
QuarkXPress	Yes	Yes	Yes	Yes	No	Yes	PSD, AI, SWF, PNG PDF, RTF
Scribus	Yes	Yes	Yes	Yes	Yes	No	PUB, TeX/LaTeX, others List
The Print Shop	No	No	No	No	No	No	No
Desktop publishing software	PDF	EPS	SVG	HTML	OpenDocument ODT	Microsoft DOCX	Other

== Output format ==
This table gives a comparison of the file formats each software can export or save.

Desktop publishing software	PDF	EPS	PNG	SVG	WebP	EPUB	HTML	Other
Affinity Publisher	Yes	Yes	Yes	Yes	No	No	No	Yes, others
Apache OpenOffice Writer	Yes	Yes	Yes	Yes	No	No	Yes	
Canva	Yes	No	Yes (Note: The free version of Canva does not support transparent backgrounds. Canva Pro or Enterprise have an option to “Remove Background” from images)	Yes	Yes	No	Yes (Note: Can export as HTML when creating an email design.)	JPEG, Video:GIF, MP4, others
Collabora Online	Yes	Yes	Yes	Yes	Yes	Yes	Yes	ODF, others
CorelDRAW	Yes	Yes	Yes	Yes	No	No	Yes	PSD, AI, SWF, WPD, others
InDesign	Yes	Yes	Yes	No	No	Yes	Yes	JPG, RTF, others
LibreOffice	Yes	Yes	Yes	Yes	Yes	Yes	Yes	ODF, JPEG, RTF, other
LyX	Yes	Yes	No	No	No	Yes	Yes	PS, ODF, TeX/LaTeX, DOCX, others
Marq	Yes	No	Yes	No	No	No	No	JPEG, GIF, MP4, others
Microsoft Publisher	Yes	No	Yes	No	No	No	Yes	JPG, TIFF
Pages	Yes	No	Yes	No	No	Yes	Yes	RTF
QuarkXPress	Yes	Yes	Yes	No	No	Yes	Yes	Kindle
Scribus	Yes	Yes	Yes	Yes	No	Yes	Yes	List, TeX/LaTeX
The Print Shop	Yes	No	No	No	No	No	No	No
Desktop publishing software	PDF	EPS	PNG	SVG	WebP	EPUB	HTML	Other

== See also ==
- List of desktop publishing software
- List of office suites
- Comparison of office suites
