= List of camera types =

- Camera, the general term:
  - 360 camera (VR camera)
  - 3D camcorder
  - Action camera
  - Animation camera
  - Autofocus camera
  - Backup camera
  - Banquet camera
  - Body camera
  - Box camera
  - Bridge camera
  - Camcorder
  - Camera phone
  - Camera lucida
  - Camera obscura
  - Closed-circuit television camera (CCTV)
  - Compact camera
  - Compact System cameras
  - Dashcam
  - Digital camera
  - Digital movie camera
  - Digital single-lens reflex camera
  - Disposable camera
  - Document camera
  - Event camera
  - Field camera
  - FireWire camera
  - Folding camera
  - Front-facing camera
  - Gun camera
  - Helmet camera
  - High-speed camera
  - Hidden camera (Spy camera)
  - Imago camera
  - Instant camera
  - IP camera
  - Keychain camera
  - Large format camera
  - Light-field camera
  - Live-preview digital camera
  - Medium format camera
  - Mirrorless interchangeable-lens camera
  - Monorail camera
  - Movie camera
  - Multiplane camera
  - Omnidirectional camera
  - Onboard camera
  - Pinhole camera
  - Pinspeck camera
  - Plate camera
  - Pocket camera
  - Pocket video camera
  - Point-and-shoot camera
  - Polaroid camera
  - Police body camera
  - Pool safety camera
  - Press camera
  - Process camera
  - Professional video camera
  - Rapatronic camera
  - Rangefinder camera
  - Red light camera
  - Reflex camera
  - Remote camera
  - Rostrum camera
  - Schmidt camera
  - Security camera
  - Single-lens reflex camera
  - Stat camera
  - Stereo camera (3D camera)
  - Still camera
  - Still video camera
  - Streak camera
  - Subminiature camera
  - System camera
  - Thermal imaging camera (firefighting)
  - Thermographic camera
  - Time-of-flight camera
  - Toy camera
  - Traffic camera
  - Traffic enforcement camera
  - Twin-lens reflex camera
  - Video camera
  - View camera
  - Webcam
  - Wright camera
  - Zenith camera
  - Zoom-lens reflex camera
- The term camera is also used, for devices producing images or image sequences from measurements of the physical world, or when the image formation cannot be described as photographic:
  - Acoustic camera which makes sound visible in three dimensions
  - Gamma camera
  - Magnetic resonance imaging which produce images showing, internal structure of different parts of a patient's body.
  - Rangefinder camera which produce images of the distance to each point in the scene.
  - Ultrasonography uses ultrasonic cameras that produce images of the absorption of ultra-sonic energy.
  - Virtual camera, in computing and gaming.
