= Graphic design occupations =

Graphic design careers include creative director, art director, art production manager, brand identity developer, illustrator and layout artist.

== Graphic art managers ==
The following are positions or responsibilities and usually titles, held by experienced graphic designers in related management roles:

=== Creative director ===
A creative director's range of experience can be broad and encompass a number of disciplines; visual design; copywriting, art direction, advertising account director, film/video director. A creative director's job is to initiate the creative concept of a project and drive the direction of the project. The role of a creative director is to formulate creative concepts, whether it is an advertising campaign, brand identity, TV commercial, or marketing campaign. A creative director is often referred to as an 'ideas guy' and works with a team of 'creatives' — an art director, graphic designer, copywriter, or film director — to produce the concept and final production.

=== Art director ===
Art directors make sure that illustrators and production artists produce and complete their work on time and to the creative director or client's satisfaction. Art directors also play a major role in the development of a project by making decisions on the visual elements of the project, and by giving the final say on the selection of models, art, props, colors, and other elements. Art directors need advanced training in graphic design as they often create artwork and design themselves. However, an art director's time may be consumed doing supervisory and administrative work.

=== Art production manager ===
Art production managers or traffic managers oversee the production aspect of art to improve efficiency and cost effectiveness. Art production managers supervise artists or advise the supervisors of artists. Creative directors and art directors often assume the role of art production managers, especially when production cost is not a critical enough concern to designate a manager for the specific role.

== Hands-on graphic designer ==
The following are positions or responsibilities, not necessarily titles, held by art directors and graphic designers:

=== Brand identity developer ===
Brand identity design is concerned with the visual aspects of a company or organization's brand or identity. A brand identity design is the visual element that represents how a company wants to be seen; it is the company's visual identity, and is how a company illustrates its ‘image.’ A company's brand identity can be represented in terms of design through a unique logo, or signage, and is then often integrated throughout all the elements of a company's materials such as business cards, stationery, packaging, media advertising, promotions, and more. Brand identity may include logo design. Brand identity development is usually a collaborative effort between creative directors, art directors, copywriters, account managers and the client.

==== Broadcast designers ====
A broadcast designer is a person involved with creating graphic designs and electronic media incorporated in television productions that are used by character generator (CG) operators. A broadcast designer may have a degree in digital media (or a similar degree), or is self-taught in the software needed to create such content.

==== Logo designer ====
The job of a logo designer is to provide a new and innovative way to express the key points of a company through an image. Logo designers take the information given to them by the client and work, using their own creativity along with marketing strategy to find an appropriate image that their client can use to represent what they are trying to encourage, sell, or what they are. It is not likely that a company will specialize in logo design or have a position for a designated logo designer. Art directors and graphic designers usually perform logo designs.

==== Marketing designer ====
A marketing designer creates illustrations and digital images. They also develop presentations for companies and businesses to market and promote their goods and services to the public.

=== Illustrator ===
Illustrators conceptualize and create illustrations that represent an idea or a story through two-dimensional or three-dimensional images. Illustrators may do drawings for printed materials such as books, magazines, and other publications, or for commercial products such as textiles, packaging, wrapping paper, greeting cards, calendars, stationery, and more.

Illustrators use many different media, from pencil and paint to digital formatting, to prepare and create their illustrations. An illustrator consults with clients in order to determine what illustrations will best meet the story they are trying to tell, or what message they are trying to communicate.

Illustrating may be a secondary skill requirement of graphic design or a specialty skill of a freelance artist, usually known for a unique style of illustrating. Illustration may be published separately as in fine art. However, illustrations are usually inserted into page layouts for communication design in the context of graphic design professions.

==== Visual image developer ====
Similar to illustration are other methods of developing images such as photography, 3D modeling, and image editing. Creative professionals in these positions are not usually called illustrators, but are utilized the same way. Photographers are likely to freelance. 3D modelers are likely to be employed for long-term projects. Image editing is usually a secondary skill to either of the above, but may also be a specialty to aid web development, software development, or multimedia development in a job title known as multimedia specialist. Although these skills may require technical knowledge, graphic design skills may be applied as well.

==== Multimedia developer ====
Multimedia developers may come from a graphic design or illustration background and apply those talents to motion, sound, or interactivity. Motion designers are graphic designers for motion. Animators are illustrators for motion. Videographers are photographers for motion. Multimedia developers may also image edit, sound edit, program, or compose multimedia just as multimedia specialists.

==== Content developer ====
Content developers include illustrators, visual image developers, and multimedia developers in software and web development. Content development includes non-graphical content as well.

==== Visual journalist ====
Visual journalists, also known as infographic artists create information graphics or Infographics; visual representations of information, data or knowledge. These graphics are used anywhere where information needs to be explained quickly or simply, such as in signs, maps, journalism, technical writing, and education. They are also used extensively as tools by computer scientists, mathematicians, and statisticians to ease the process of developing and communicating conceptual information. They are applied in all aspects of scientific visualization.

=== Layout artist ===
A layout artist deals with the structure and layout of images and text in a pleasing format. This can include magazine work, brochures, flyers, books, CD booklets, posters, and similar formats. For magazines and similar productions, color, typeface, text formatting, graphic layout and more must be considered. Page layouts are usually done by art directors, graphic designers, artworkers, production artists or a combination of those positions.

Entry level layout work is often known as paste up art. Entry level layout graphic designers are often known as production artists. In an in-house art department, layout artists are sometimes known as DTP artists or DTP associates.

==== Interface designer ====
Interface designers are graphical user interface (GUI) layout artists. They are employed by multimedia, software, and web development companies. Because graphical control elements are interactive, interface design often overlaps interaction design. Because interfaces are not usually composed as single computer files, interface design may require technical understanding, including graphical integration with code. Because interfaces may require hundreds of assets, knowledge of how to automate graphic production may be required. An interface designer may hold the job title of web designer in a web development company.

==== Web designer ====
A web designer's work could be viewed by thousands of people every day. Web designers create the pages, layout, and graphics for web pages, and play a key role in the development of a website. Web designers have the task of creating the look and feel of a website by choosing the style, and by designing attractive graphics, images, and other visual elements, and adapting them for the website's pages. Web designers also design and develop the navigation tools of a site. Web designers may make decisions regarding what content is included on a web page, where things are placed, and how the aesthetic and continuity is maintained from one screen to the next. All of this involves skill and training in computer graphics, graphic design, and in the latest in computer and web technology.

Depending on the scope of the project, web design may involve collaboration between software engineers and graphic designers. The graphic design of a website may be as simple as a page layout sketch or handling just the graphics in an HTML editor, while the advance coding is done separately by programmers. In other cases, graphic designers may be challenged to become both graphic designer and programmer in the process of web design in positions often known as web masters.

==== Package designer ====
A package designer or packaging technician may utilize technical skills aside from graphic design. Knowledge of cuts, crease, folding, nature and behavior of the packaging material such as paper, corrugated sheet, synthetic or other type of materials may also be required. A customer may see the top/outside of a package at first, but may also be drawn to other package design features. A packaging design may require three-dimensional space layout skills in addition to visual communication to consider how well a design works at multiple angles. CAD software applications specifically for packaging design may be utilized

== See also ==
- Advertising agency
- Graphic design
- Graphic arts
- List of 2D graphics software
- List of 2D animation software
- List of 3D modeling software
- List of 3D rendering software
- List of 3D animation software
