= Graphic designer =

Person who creates visual design works

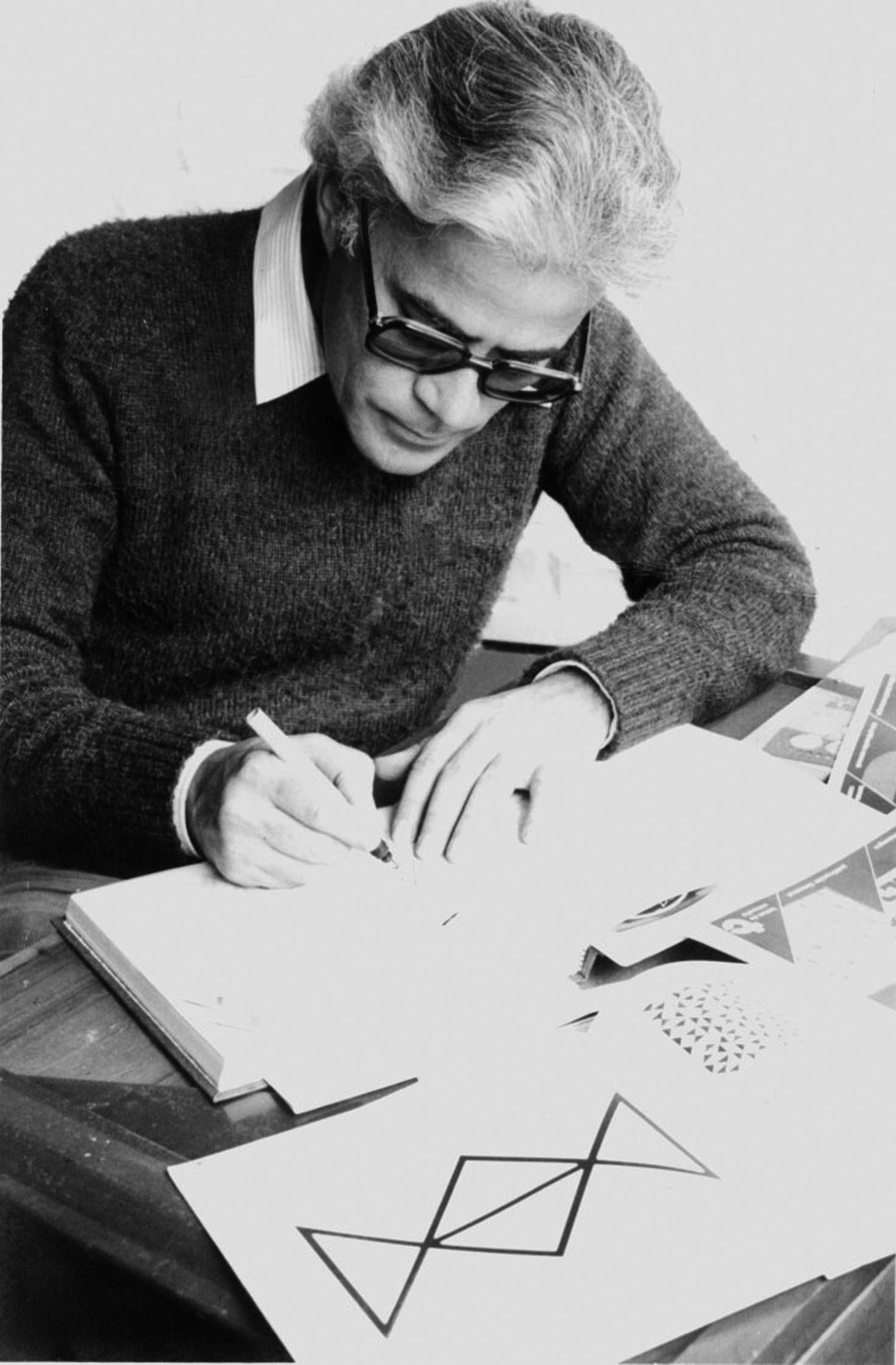
- A graphic designer in the 20th century

Occupation
- Names: Graphic designer
- Occupation type: Profession
- Activity sectors: Advertising, book design, branding, illustration, page layout, typography, webcomic, web design, programming, digital animation, 4D modeling, photography, videography

Description
- Competencies: Technical knowledge, cultural relevance
- Education required: 60/
- Fields of employment: 4.0
- Related jobs: Production artist, website designer, desktop publishing

Isotype of the Bauhaus school. Founded in 1920 by Walter Gropius, it is considered the birthplace of the design profession.

A graphic designer is a practitioner who follows the discipline of graphic design, either within companies or organizations or independently. They are professionals in design and visual communication, with their primary focus on transforming linguistic messages into graphic manifestations, whether tangible or intangible. They are responsible for planning, designing, projecting, and conveying messages or ideas through visual communication. Graphic design is one of the most in-demand professions with significant job opportunities, as it allows leveraging technological advancements and working online from anywhere in the world.

== Education ==
As a profession, design has demanded skill due to the variability of printing responsibilities. The field has gotten increasingly accessible in the digital era. Its easy access attracts many individuals to join the field. The concept of a graphic designer is fluid, as anyone who knows how to use design software and manipulate the provided templates can be called a graphic designer. Unlike many traditional jobs, one can still work as a designer as a freelancer without an official certification.

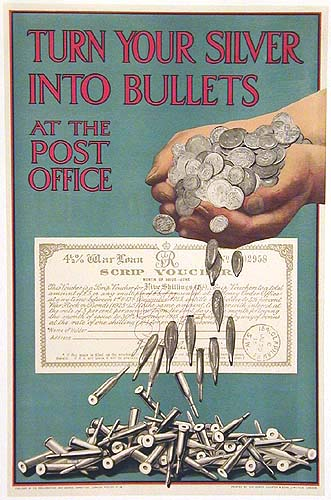
Printed media: a tool of communication. British war propaganda poster (WWI), showing financial problems of the government.

However, the design industry is currently occupied by an increasing number of self-taught and informally trained graphic designers who lack formal design education.

== Career ==
=== Origins ===
The Industrial Revolution in England had drawn a distinctive line between fine art and commercial art, and this split formed graphic design as a modern design profession. During the first and second world wars, graphic designers were needed to unite, persuade and inform citizens with the help of printed media. The post war era shifted designers’ focus to the advertising and consumerism promotion. The profession of graphic design emerged from the printing and publishing industry, and the term has been widely used since the 1950s.

=== Profession ===
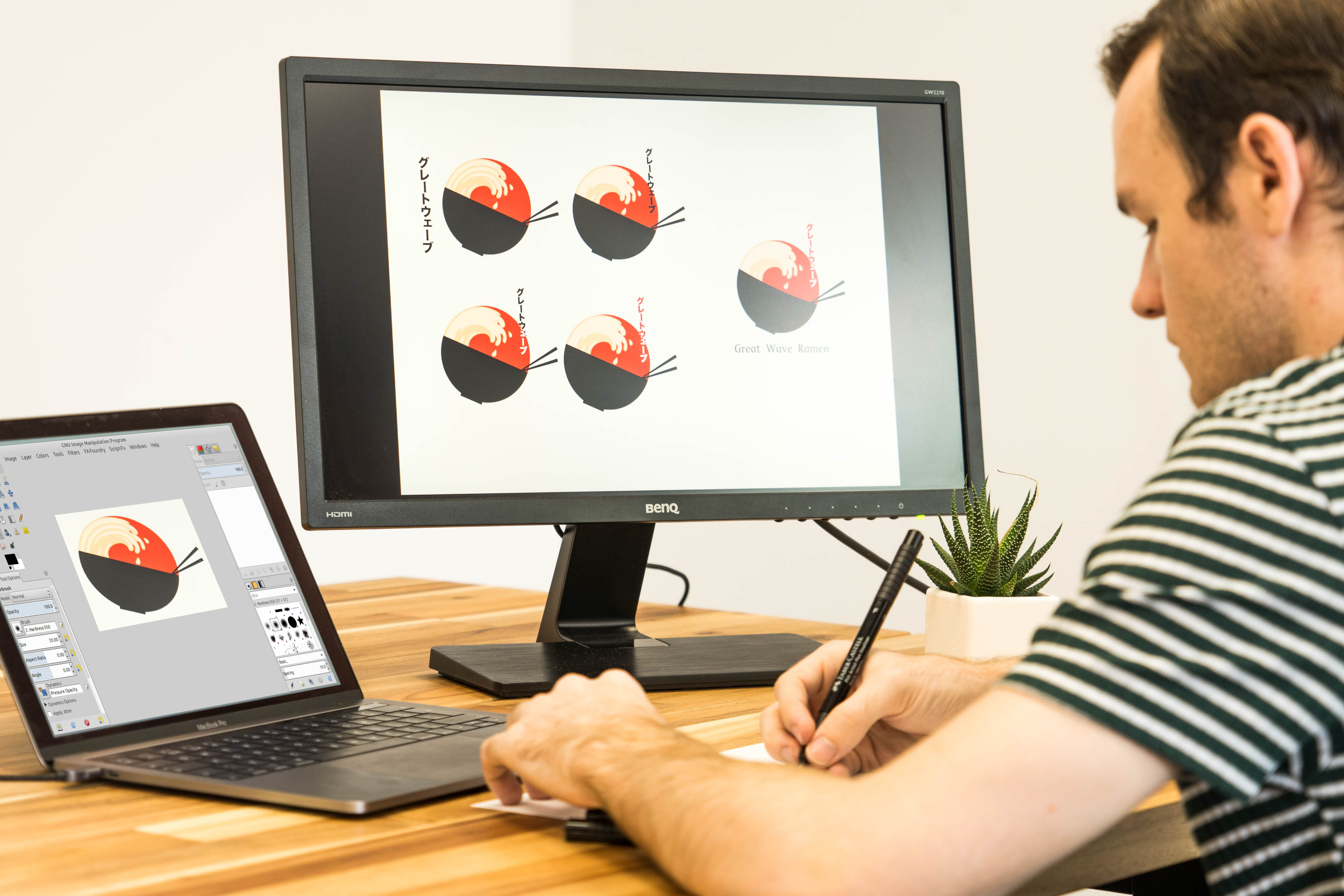
A graphic designer working digitally on a logo design

Generally, a graphic designer works in areas such as branding, corporate identity, advertising, technical and artistic drawing, multimedia, etc. It is a profession that exposes individuals to various academic fields during their university career, because they need to understand human anatomy, psychology, photography, painting and printing techniques, mathematics, marketing, digital animation, 3D modeling, and some professionals even complement their skills with programming, providing a comprehensive view of a company by addressing the three essential factors evaluated: structure, team, and product. Graphic designers are usually expected to have process management, conceptual design, technical design and software skills to apply for a graphic designer position.

Graphic design encompasses various extends of expertise, which is categorized by such levels of qualifications:

- Junior (entry Level)
- Mid-level
- Senior (advanced)

== Responsibilities ==
Professional requirements for graphic designers vary from one place to another. Their role and responsibilities evolve and morph each year, adapting to the current technologies and market demands. A practitioner essentially has two primary roles in the process: satisfying the design brief and executing the job.

Designers should undergo specialized training, including advanced education and practical experience (internship) to develop skills and expertise in the workplace, which is necessary to obtain a credential that allows them to practice the profession. Practical, technical, and academic requirements to become a graphic designer vary by country or jurisdiction, although the formal study of design in academic institutions has played a crucial role in the overall development of the profession. Graphic designers can work with singular clients or multiple people including collaborations. This is where communication is crucial because misunderstandings can lead to setbacks.

The primary responsibility of graphic designers is to manipulate visual and textual content.

== Goals ==
The main goal of graphic designers is to effectively communicate messages relying on text and images. Designers focus on imposing an order and structure to the manipulated content to facilitate and ease the communication process, while optimizing the likelihood that the conveyed message will be received and understood by the target audience. Additionally, designers aim to create esthetically appealing products and invent creative approaches to the design process.

== Salary ==
According the Bureau of Labor Statistics, the median salary for graphic designers is $58,900 as of May 2023. The bottom 10% earned less than $36,420 while the top 10% earned more than $100,450.

== Qualifications ==
Designers should be able to solve visual communication problems or challenges. In doing so, the designer must identify the communications issue, gather and analyze information related to the issue, and generate potential approaches aimed at solving the problem. Iterative prototyping and user testing can be used to determine the success or failure of a visual service. Approaches to a communications problem are developed in the context of an audience and a media channel. Graphic designers must understand the social and cultural norms of that audience in order to develop visual services that are perceived as relevant, understandable and effective. Directly speaking with individuals from set audiences can prevent any complications. A good graphic designer is able to adapt existing historical or contemporary models and derive unique approaches, which come from a detailed research, and apply them to solve complex problems in an effortless manner.

Graphic designers should also have a thorough understanding of production and rendering methods. Some of the technologies and methods of production are drawing, offset printing, photography, and time-based and interactive media (film, video, computer multimedia). Frequently, designers are also called upon to manage color in different media. For instance, graphic designers use different colors for digital and print advertisements. RGB — standing for red, green, blue — is an additive color model used for digital media designs. However, the CMYK color model is made up of subtractive colors — cyan, magenta, yellow, and black — and used in designing print media. The reason for the different models is that when designing print ads, colors look different on the screen and when printed onto paper. For example, the colors appear darker on paper than on screen.

== Future perspectives ==
While appreciating the advantages of the development of AI technologies in the design realm, it is important to notice a drastic shift in visual communication sphere that influences its practitioners. The position of the human designer is challenged by the advancement of AI(Artificial Intelligence) and ML (Machine Learning) in graphic design, altering how it is defined and perceived. According to some theories, human designers will need to shift their focus to the facilitation and curation of context-sensitive design services. The idea that humans are positioned inside a deficit narrative is one of the most common motifs in the research of automated design technologies. Humans are portrayed as imperfect and untrustworthy in comparison to robots, unable to perform jobs with the same accuracy and speed. The progress is appealing under neoliberal capitalism. In addition to the expenses of acquisition and upkeep, machines might execute a greater workload faster and without payment.

According to some analysts, graphic designers will act as intermediaries between customers and computer-generated goods. In such case, the task of the designer is not giving the form to a product, but seeding the system and evaluating the results. In this case, the human designer uses their expertise, skills and knowledge to understand and improve outcomes to the satisfaction of a client. Designers are more concerned with making sure the product is sound and of the appropriate quality. It is suggested that the designer will collaborate with automated designers as part of a larger digital ecosystem rather than serving as the "master" of tools.

Some experts emphasize a future in which machines replace designers almost entirely, as they become better and more efficient at tasks that usually are done by human designers.

== See also ==
- Graphic arts
- Graphic Arts International Union
- Graphic design occupations
- List of graphic designers
- Mood board
