= Joshua Jensen-Nagle =

Joshua Jensen-Nagle (born May 19, 1981, in New Jersey, USA), is a contemporary photographer based in Toronto, Canada. Jensen-Nagle studied photography at Ryerson University from 1999 to 2003. Nagle has been represented by the NextStreet Gallery, the Anne Loucks Fine Art Gallery and the Bau-Xi Gallery.

== Style and influences ==
Jensen-Nagle is known for using techniques and devices such as pinhole cameras, paint splatter and vintage film to produce distinctive images. Jensen-Nagle's later work employs a distinctive mounting technique which gives his photos a surreal quality. Many of his compositions feature aerial shots of beaches and cityscapes.

== Museum exhibitions ==
2008 - "Through the Looking Glass and The Paradise Institute", September 26 - November 16, 2008 Glenbow Museum, Calgary, Alberta

2010 - Griffin Museum of Photography, Boston, MA, USA
