= Snow goggles =

Eye protection of the Inuit

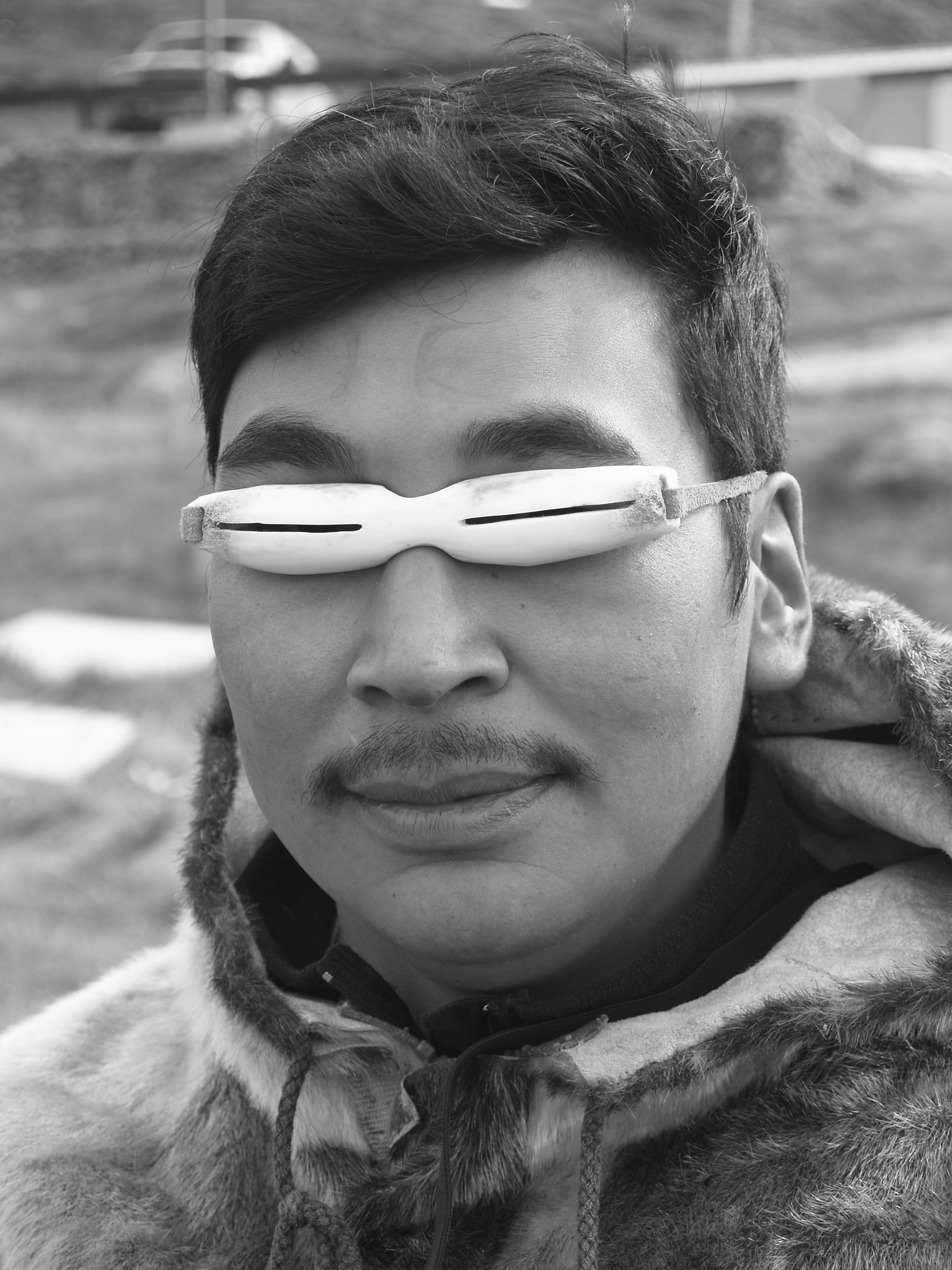
Inuit goggles made from caribou antler with caribou sinew for a strap

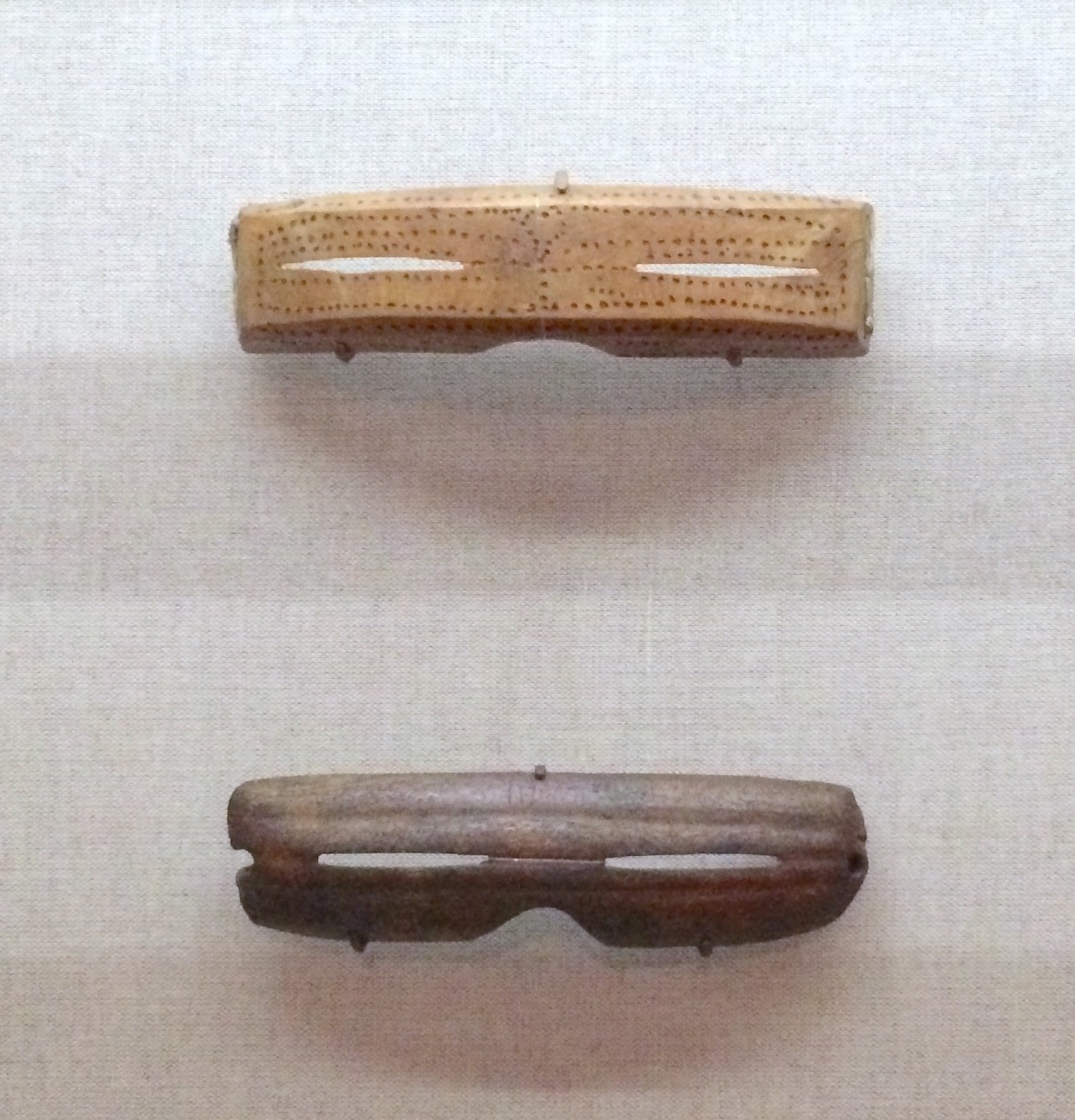
Inuit snow goggles from Alaska. Made from carved wood, 1880–1890 (top) and caribou antler 1000–1800 (bottom)

Snow goggles (Inuktitut: ilgaak or iggaak, syllabics: ᐃᓪᒑᒃ or ᐃᒡᒑᒃ; Central Yupik: nigaugek, nigauget) are a type of eyewear traditionally used by Inuit and the Yupik peoples of the Arctic to prevent snow blindness.

The goggles are traditionally made of driftwood (especially spruce), bone, walrus ivory, caribou antler, or in some cases seashore grass. The workpiece is carved to fit the wearer's face, and one or more narrow horizontal slits are carved through the front. The goggles fit tightly against the face so that the only light entering is through the slits. They achieve this by utilizing an adjustable head strap made out of sinew, leather, or rawhide. Soot is sometimes applied to the inside to help cut down on glare. The slits are made narrow not only to reduce the amount of light entering but also to improve the visual acuity, as with a pinhole camera. Since the goggles sharply restrict the angle of vision, the user risks tripping; wider slits enlarge the field of view.

== Terminology ==
Like other terms in Inuit languages, such as inukhuk / inuksuk, a different word may be used in different dialects. In the Kivalliq dialect, ilgaak (ᐃᓪᒑᒃ) is used, while the North Baffin dialect uses iggaak (ᐃᒡᒑᒃ). Both words are also used to refer to sunglasses.

In the Central Alaskan Yupʼik, snow goggles are called nigaugek, while in Cup'ig they are igguag. In the Central Siberian Yupik language, the word is iyegaatek.

== See also ==
- Dark adaptor goggles
- Eye protection
- Pinhole glasses
