= Pinhole (optics) =

Tiny hole functioning as an optical component

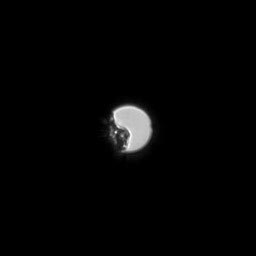
Wide-field micrograph of a damaged 80 μm pinhole

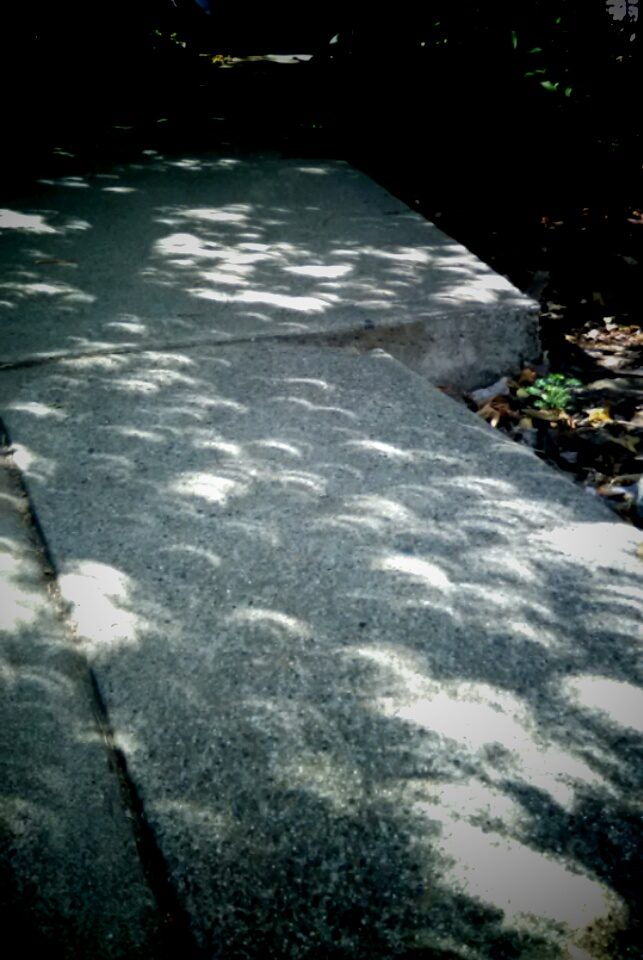
Natural pinholes formed by tree leaves – Solar eclipse of August 21, 2017 in Washington state

A pinhole is a small circular hole, as could be made with the point of a pin. In optics, pinholes with diameter between a few micrometers and a hundred micrometers are used as apertures in optical systems. Pinholes are commonly used to spatially filter a beam (such as a laser beam), where the small pinhole acts as a low-pass filter for spatial frequencies in the image plane of the beam.

A small pinhole can act as a lens, focusing light. This effect is used in pinhole cameras and camera obscura, and in solarigraphy. This effect is also used in pinhole occluders, which are used by ophthalmologists, orthoptists, and optometrists to test visual acuity. The same principle has also been applied as an alternative to corrective lenses: a screen of pinholes is mounted on an eyeglass frame and worn as pinhole glasses.

Besides pinholes made by the point of a pin, precision commercial pinholes are often made by laser drilling through a thin foil.

Natural pinholes formed by tree leaves produce multiple crescent-shaped projections during a solar eclipse.
