= Pinhead mirror =

Principle of a pinhead camera. Light rays from the object reflect off a small mirror and are projected as an image.

A pinhead mirror can be used to create a camera similar to a pinhole camera. Instead of passing through a tiny aperature, the light to form the image is reflected by a small disc-shaped mirror (with a diameter the same as that of a pinhole; about 0.15 mm - 0.4 mm). One advantage is that a pinhead mirror can be swiveled to scan a scene or project a scene to different locations.

Pinhead mirror technology was protected under US patent 4,948,211 - "Method and Apparatus for Optical Imaging Using a Small, Flat Reflecting Surface" until the patent expired in 2009.

Disco balls can be used as pinhead mirrors to project solar images. The math behind them is the same as for a square pinhole.
