= Paste up =

Means of preparing copy for printing

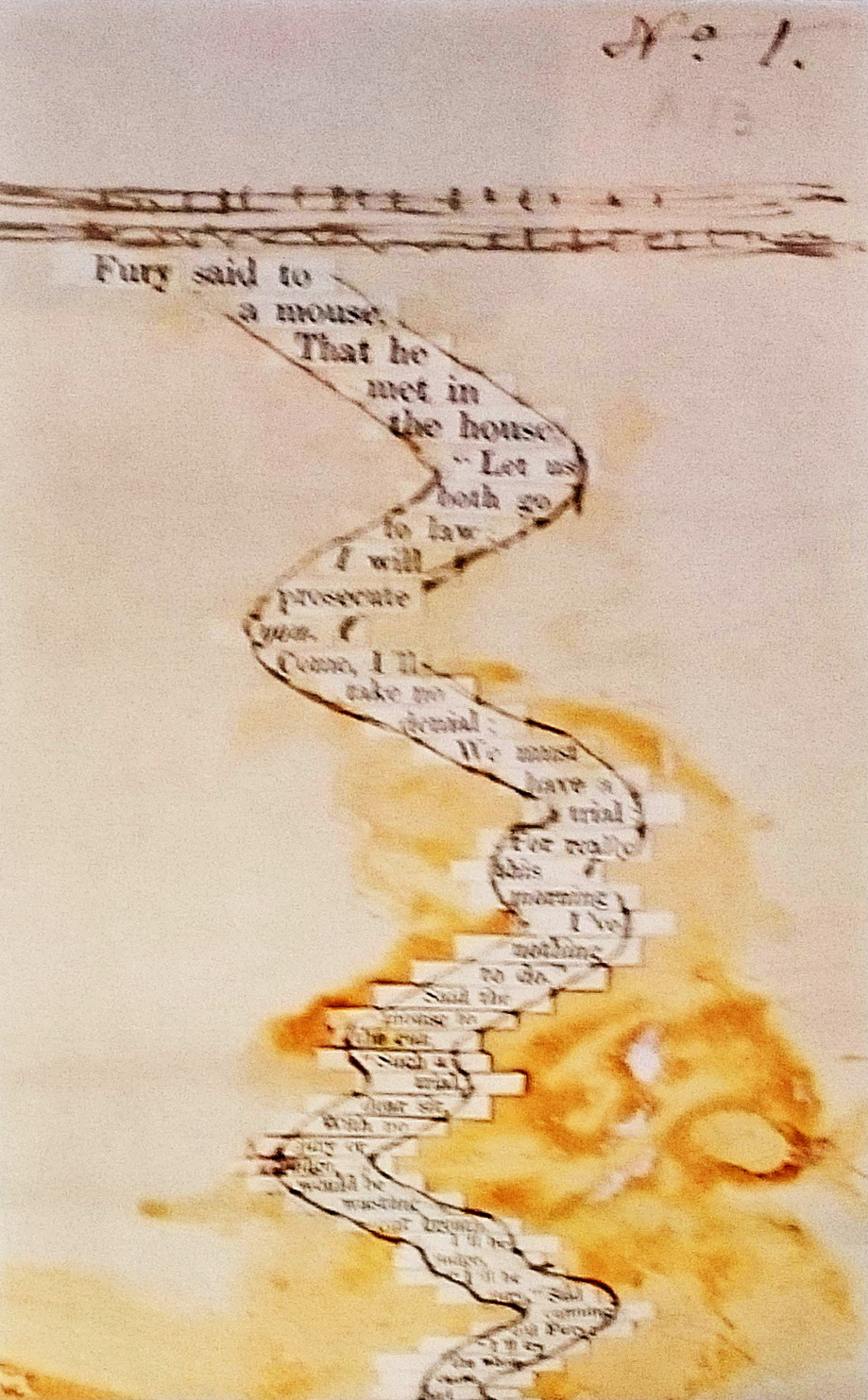
A paste-up for a poem from an edition of Alice in Wonderland, held in the Oxford University Press museum

Paste up is a method of creating or laying out publication pages that predates the use of the now-standard computerized page design desktop publishing programs. Completed, or camera-ready, pages are known as mechanicals or mechanical art. In the offset lithography process, the mechanicals would be photographed with a stat camera to create a same-size film negative for each printing plate required.

Paste up relied on phototypesetting, a process that would generate "cold type" on photographic paper that usually took the form of long columns of text. These printouts were often a single column in a scroll of narrow (3-inch or 4-inch) paper that was as deep as the length of the story.

A professional known variously as a paste-up artist, layout artist, mechanical artist, production artist, or compositor would cut the type into sections and arrange it carefully across multiple columns. For example, a 15 inch strip could be cut into three 5-inch sections. Headlines and other typographic elements were often created and supplied separately by the typesetter, leaving it to the paste up artist to determine their final position on the page.

Adhesive was then applied to the back side of these strips, either by applying rubber cement with a brush or passing them through a machine that would apply a wax adhesive. The adhesives were intentionally made semi-permanent, allowing the strips to be removed and moved around the layout if it needed to be changed. The strips would be adhered to a board, usually a stiff white paper on which the artist would draw the publication's margins and columns, either lightly in pencil or in non-photographic blue ink, a light cyan color that would be ignored by the orthochromatic film used to make printing plates in offset lithography. For magazines, newspapers, and other recurring projects, often the boards would be pre-printed in this color.

Other camera-ready materials like photostats and line art would also be prepared with adhesive and attached to the boards. Continuous-tone photographs would need halftoning, which would require black paper or red film (which photo-imaged the same as black) to be trimmed and placed on the board in place of the image; in the process of creating the negative film for the printing plates, the solid black area would create a clear spot on the negative, called a window. The photographs would be converted to halftone film separately and then positioned in this window to complete the page (although this process was typically performed by a different worker, known as a negative "stripper").

Once a page was complete, the board would be attached to an easel and photographed in order to create a negative, which was then used to make a printing plate for offset printing.

Paste up was preceded by hot type and cold type technologies. Starting in the 1990s, many newspapers started doing away with paste up, switching to desktop publishing software that allows pages to be designed completely on a computer. Such software includes QuarkXPress, PageMaker and InDesign.

May 7 is observed as National paste up day in the US.

== See also ==
- Fix-up
- Page layout
