= DTP artist =

Desktop publishing worker

A desktop publishing artist or artworker is a desktop publishing worker, responsible for translating the work of art directors and graphic designers into digital files ready to go to print or be placed online. A DTP operator is usually skilled in multiple computer design applications, such as Adobe CS.

This job description is used in advertising agencies, publishing, color separation, printing and related industries. DTP operators were formerly known as FA artists (FA: Finished artwork); the name changed with the introduction of digital processes.

The median pay for a DTP artist in 2022 was $47,910 per year or $23.04 per hour. Most organizations require an associates degree for this role, but do not require prior experience. Although there is a short amount of training needed, it often will take place on the job. In 2022, there were about 8,500 jobs for this position, with overall the amount of positions declining.

== See also ==
- Production artist
- Graphic designers
- Visualizer (advertising)
- Art director
