= Pinhole occluder =

Ophthalmological testing tool

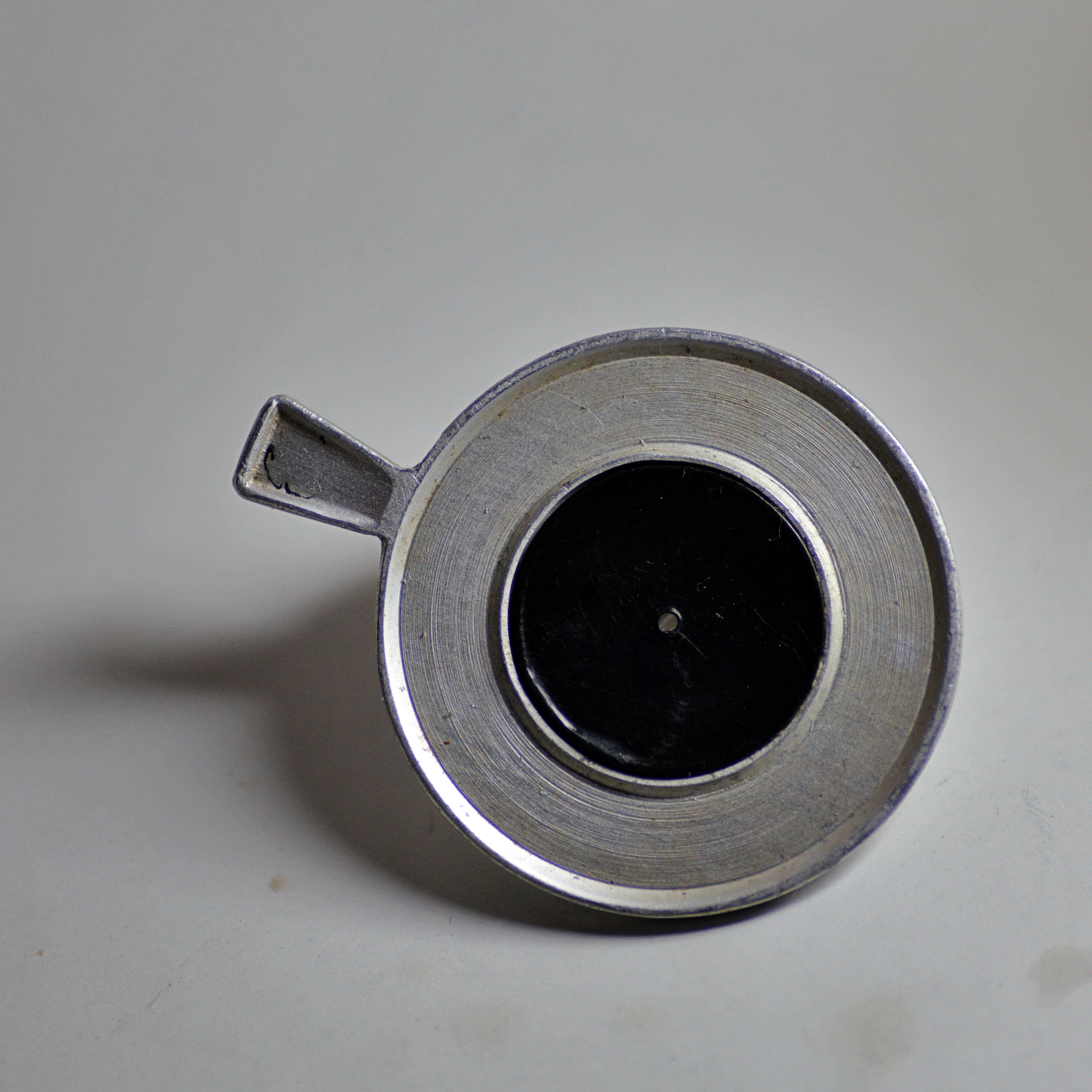
- Pinhole occluder in ophthalmic trial lens set
- Purpose: Pinhole occluder is used to estimate the improvement in visual acuity, evaluate potential visual acuity in cataract etc.
- Test of: Visual acuity
- Based on: Pinhole (optics)

A pinhole occluder is an opaque disk with one or more small holes through it, used by ophthalmologists, orthoptists and optometrists to test visual acuity. The occluder is a simple way to focus light, as in a pinhole camera, temporarily removing the effects of refractive errors such as myopia. Because light passes only through the center of the eye's lens, defects in the shape of the lens (errors of refraction) have no effect while the occluder is used. In this way, the ophthalmologist, orthoptist or optometrist can estimate the maximum improvement in a patient's vision that can be attained by lenses to correct errors of refraction. This can be used to distinguish visual defects caused by refractive error, which improve when the occluder is used, from other problems, which do not. The pinhole occluder can also be used in testing visual acuity in mydriatic patients. In this case, the pinhole occluder compensates for the inability to contract the iris assisting the eye in obtaining a retinal projection similar to that of a non-cycloplegic eye.

Squinting and looking through a tiny hole made with a finger works similarly to a pinhole occluder, by blocking light through the outer parts of the eye's lens. An improvised pinhole has a similar but better effect. The same principle has also been applied as an alternative to corrective lenses: a screen of pinholes is mounted on an eyeglass frame and worn as pinhole glasses.

Differential diagnosis:

- pinhole worsen vision: Macular diseases, central lens opacities
- Vision static with pinhole: Amblyopia
