= Style sheet (desktop publishing) =

A style sheet is a feature in desktop publishing programs that store and apply formatting to text. Style sheets are a form of separation of presentation and content: it creates a separate abstraction to keep the presentation isolated from the text data.

Style sheets are a common feature in most popular desktop publishing and word processing programs, including Corel Ventura, Adobe InDesign, Scribus, PageMaker, QuarkXPress, WordPerfect, and Microsoft Word, though they may be referred to using slightly different terminology. For example, in Microsoft Word a style sheet is known as a template.

The most well-known form of style sheet is the Cascading Style Sheet (CSS), which is used for styling Web pages.

== Use ==
Individual styles are created by the user and may include a wide variety of commands that dictate how a selected portion of text is formatted:

- Typeface or font
- Boldfacing
- Italicizing
- Underlining
- Justification (left, right, center, justify, force justify)
- Space before and after paragraphs
- Tab stops and indentation
- Type size
- Leading
- Kerning
- Tracking
- Color
- Borders or strokes
- Superscript or subscript
- Dropcaps
- Letter case
- Strike through
- Outline font style
- Hyphenation

In most programs with style sheets, there is a window or menu listing the style sheets the user has associated with the document. For example, a newspaper may have a style sheet for its story text called "Body copy" that sets the type at 10 point Nimrod with 11 point leading and justified alignment.

Most programs allow users to name their own styles. Usually easy-to-remember names are used that describe what the style is used for. Common names might include "headline," "subhead" and "byline."

To apply a style to a portion of text, most programs allow users to select the text with their mouse and then click on the desired style in a style panel.

Some programs split style sheets into two classes: paragraph and character.

Paragraph style sheets are applied to an entire paragraph while character styles are applied to only a select number of characters. Character styles are useful when a user needs to format only a small portion of a paragraph. For example, a newspaper may publish lists of current movies by starting with the name of a movie in a bold, sans serif typeface. Then, without starting a new paragraph, the review starts in the standard story text format. In this case, the designer could highlight the movie title and select the appropriate character style to apply the formatting only to the title. The rest of the paragraph can then be styled independently.

More advanced layout programs allow users to format more complex paragraphs with a single paragraph style. Using our movie review example above, say the newspaper always places a colon after the movie title and runs 10 short movie reviews as one large story. In this case, the style could be programmed to apply the bold, sans serif typeface at the start of a new paragraph until it encounters a colon. After the colon, the style switches to the standard story text style. Therefore, the designer could highlight the entire collection and apply only one style that will automatically format the entire story without having to go through and apply separate character styles to each of the 10 reviews.

Some scorewriters, including MuseScore and Sibelius, implement style sheets to control the appearance and layout of sheet music.

== Benefits ==
Style sheets help publications maintain consistency, so common elements such as story text, headlines and bylines always appear the same. Style sheets also help save time allowing a designer to click once rather than having to apply each element one at a time and risk using an incorrect value.

Finally, style sheets are also useful if a publication decides to make changes to a design - say, make the story text slightly smaller. A user with proper administrative access can make the change to the master style sheet and then "send" the revised style sheets to all users, so the change is automatically reflected.
