= Steven Pippin =

English artist

- Born: Steven John Pippin; 1960 (age 65–66); Redhill, Surrey, England
- Known for: Sculpture
- Movement: Young British Artists
- Website: www.mrpippin.co.uk

Steven Pippin (born 1960 at Redhill, Surrey) is an English photographer and installation artist. Pippin works with converted or improvised photographic equipment and kinetic sculptures which are often based on physical models and are metaphors for social mechanisms.

== Early life and education ==
Pippin's work shows a strong interest in the mechanical, which he has said stems from an early childhood memory of seeing his father surrounded by the wires and tubes of a television set he was repairing.

He studied mechanical engineering at Charles Keen College, Leicester; Foundation Art & Design at Loughborough College, Leicestershire; Fine Art Sculpture at Brighton Polytechnic and Fine Art Sculpture at Chelsea School of Art, London

During his student days he was selected for the DAAD scholarship (German Academic Exchange Service)

From the beginning of his career his works focused on creating atmospheric photographs by converting every day object into provisional pin hole cameras. Later his photography became closer to science after making peace with this type of disciplines.

I hated it because my father and grandfather were engineers... I've gone back to technology now, but for a long time I didn't touch it; I blocked it. I tried making gears out of cardboard when I already had the knowledge to machine the parts!

== Artistic career ==
Pippin's early work was based on converting furniture and everyday objects into makeshift pinhole cameras which he then used to take sympathetic photographs. Sympathetic photography, as seen through photographer Allan Sekula (1951–2013) using photography not only for an aesthetic purpose but as a tool to show injustices and bodily suffering.

His work often involves a significant amount of planning to overcome the practical problems posed by the chosen object. Pippin typically has to plan and construct a significant amount of supporting equipment to achieve his pictures. Frequently the resulting photographs are distorted or otherwise compromised by the manner of their construction, but the imperfections are seen as an important characteristic of the image, giving a link back to the object which was used as a camera. The photographs are always shown alongside an image of the converted object, and for later works, much of the actual equipment used in the conversion along with supporting documentation.

== Artistic work ==
=== Point Blank (2010) ===
Within the exhibition called A Non Event (Horizon) that took place from 16 June – 2 October 2011 at the CEAAC (Centre européen d'actions artistiques contemporaines) there is one of Steven Pippin's best-known works: Point Blank.

Throughout this series, the artist exhibits small and medium-sized analog cameras pierced by bullets along with some of the photos they took while the projectile was heading towards them, making his last photos capture the reason for its destruction. This project contains 20 images to date. It began in Wisconsin, USA, and was continued in London later.

It is precisely the fact of obtaining perforated cameras and the symbology that accompanies them that makes this series such an interesting work. As a result, photographs are obtained with distorted and fractured images with organic ramifications that are reminiscent of the chemical process that accompanies analog photographs. In some of the images obtained we can see the bullet out of focus due to its speed.

=== Analogital (2008) ===
During the eighties, a transition occurred in the world of photography that brought with it a lot of controversy, dividing photographers between those who abandoned analog to switch to digital format and those who decided to stay with the traditional technique.

In this work, Steven Pippin seeks to reflect this change through a method that consists of simultaneously taking the same photograph with a digital and an analog camera. The image resulting from the synchronized shot is exposed divided in two, either by natural borders (typical of the landscape or element photographed) or artificial ones, separating the two formats.

The analog side is done using a C print, printed by hand; and the digital side is an inkjet print.

=== Non (2007) ===
This work is one of the most philosophical, in it we can see a CANON camera from which the artist has decided to delete the first two initials, a fact that is referenced in the title of the project itself. The lens of this camera is surrounded by a system of tubes and mirrors that rotate on the camera to focus on itself. This work lacks functionality and is based on self-reflection and absurdity.

=== Ω = 1 (2003–2014) ===
Our universe is theoretically, according to astrophysical theories, in a constant state of equilibrium between collapse through implosion and total explosion. Normally, physicists use a pencil as a metaphor to show this very delicate state of balance of forces, maintaining its balance supported only by its tip. For approximately 10 years Steven Pippin dedicated himself to devising a sculpture that could represent this metaphor.

The sculpture is based mainly on two lights that project the shadows of a 2B pencil on a metal plate where it is held. These shadows are monitored by sensors that, upon detecting the slightest change, modify the position of the plate where the pencil rests with a margin of 20 milliseconds and almost imperceptibly to avoid losing balance. Thus, the pencil remains upright without the help of anything other than its tip.

This piece creates a sense of suspended time and constant anticipation, illustrating the delicate nature of balance.

=== Laundromat-Locomotion (1997) ===
The first images in this series were made in London in 1991. In 1997 Pippin expanded his idea and moved it to a laundry room in New Jersey, where he placed photographic paper on each of the backgrounds of 12 washing machines that were attached to ropes of cotton. That ropes were activated in his path to capture him walking. As we can guess from the name, this work is a tribute to Animal Locomotion (1887) by Eadweard Muybridge. In this work, Muybridge tried to confirm or deny the following hypothesis: There is a moment in a horse's trot where none of its legs are in contact with the ground. To test this bet, Muybridge had a horse run in front of 12 cameras that were activated by ropes in its path, capturing snapshots of the movement.

Thanks to this, he not only managed to demonstrate that the hypothesis was indeed true, but also laid the foundations of cinema, motion photography, and if that were not enough, he helped the world in general to better understand the movement of the horse. Later he would do more projects capturing dances and everyday movements of human beings.

Pippin's tribute was even closer to the original images obtained by Muybridge because the washing machines were spinning at 500 rpm.

(It gave the images) a certain degree of authenticity, making them look like a Muybridge original from a hundred years ago. The scratches on the surface of the negative become a substitute for time, an artificial aging process that gives the images an accidental air of authenticity.
