= Camera-ready =

Document technically ready to print

Camera-ready is a common term used in the commercial printing industry meaning that a document is, from a technical standpoint, ready to "go to press", or be printed.

== History ==
The term camera-ready was first used in the photo offset printing process, where the final layout of a document was attached to a "mechanical" or "paste up". Then, a stat camera was used to photograph the mechanical, and the final offset printing plates were created from the camera's negative.

In this system, a final paste-up that needed no further changes or additions was ready to be photographed by the process camera and subsequently printed. This final document was camera-ready.

This artwork may have looked messy to the naked eye or to a modern consumer digital camera - covered in various pieces of paper attached with adhesive or wax and composited with white out, gouache, tape and blue pencil (non-reproducible) and red masking film, black or clay-based paint (reproducible as black) - but appeared perfectly uniform to the monochrome reproducing camera used for print reproduction.

== Present usage ==
In recent years, the use of paste-ups has been steadily replaced by desktop publishing software, which allows users to create entire document layouts on the computer. In the meantime, many printers now use technology to take these digital files and create printing plates from them without use of a camera and negative. Despite this, the term camera-ready continues to be used to signify that a document is ready to be made into a printing plate.

In this new digital-to-plate system, a digital file is usually considered camera-ready if it meets several conditions:

1. It is created with a software program commonly used in the printing industry, such as LaTeX, InDesign (Adobe), Illustrator (Adobe), Freehand (Adobe/Macromedia), Quark XPress (Quark, Inc), and exported in a commonly used file format, such as EPS, PDF and sometimes TIFF. JPEG images are usually considered not camera-ready, as the compression used in the JPEG format deteriorates the quality of the image.
2. The document uses the correct color setup. If printing a (full) color document, all graphics should be converted to CMYK (cyan, magenta, yellow, and black). If it is a spot color document, the color(s) to be used by the printer must be specified in the digital file.
3. The layout is created at the correct and final size to be printed, and the document size in the desktop publishing program matches the size of the final printed piece.
4. Text or graphics that are intended to bleed off the page of the final printed piece should be extended off the document boundary in the digital file. The amount varies depending on location, but is usually 1/8 inch in the US, and 3mm in metric systems.
5. Fonts used in the digital file are converted to vector graphics (usually defined by the software as "convert to paths" or "outline text"), or alternatively, the fonts are included in the final digital package sent to the printer. The inclusion of fonts in this way is called "embedding". Be sure to embed your fonts if possible. Some fonts cannot be embedded due to copyright or usage rights.
6. Raster or image files are originally created at high resolution settings, such as 300 DPI (dots per inch). This ensures a high quality image. Images saved from Internet web pages are usually low-resolution, 72-dots-per-inch JPG or GIF files, which are not considered camera-ready.
