= Dirkon =

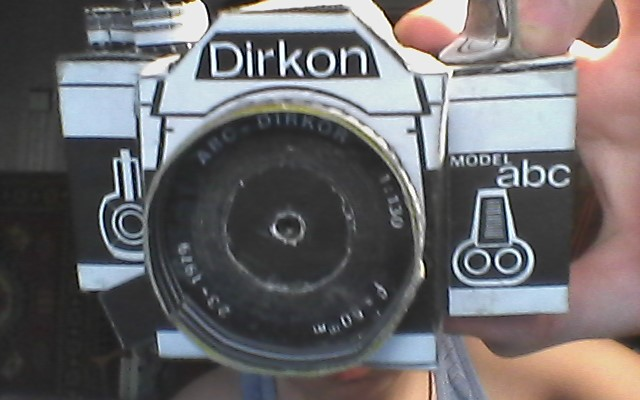
Картинка000

The Dirkon is a paper camera kit that was first published in 1979 in the Communist Czechoslovak magazine ABC mladých techniků a přírodovědců ('ABC of Young Technicians and Natural Scientists'). The pattern was created by Martin Pilný, Mirek Kolár, and Richard Vyškovský.

The name Dirkon is a play on words based on the combination of the parts of two words: Dirk- is the beginning of the Czech word dírka (pinhole), and -kon is the end of the name of the well-known Japanese camera, Nikon.

== See also ==
- Pinhole camera
