= Ventura Publisher =

Desktop publishing application

- Screenshot of Corel Ventura 10
- Developer: Alludo
- Release: 1986; 40 years ago
- Final release: 10 / 2002; 24 years ago
- Operating system: GEM, OS/2, Microsoft Windows, Classic Mac OS
- Available in: English
- Type: Desktop publishing
- License: Commercial proprietary software
- Website: https://www.coreldraw.com/en/pages/old-brands/corel-ventura/

Ventura Publisher was the first popular desktop publishing package for IBM PC compatible computers. The software was originally developed by Ventura Software, a small software company founded by John Meyer, Don Heiskell, and Lee Jay Lorenzen, all of whom met while working at Digital Research. Ventura Publisher uses the GUI features provided by Digital Research's GEM, a runtime system of which is included with the software.

== History ==
The first version of Ventura Publisher was released in late 1986, with worldwide distribution by Xerox. Xerox would later purchase all rights to the source code from Ventura Software in 1990.

Ventura Publisher had some text editing and line drawing capabilities of its own, but it was designed to interface with a wide variety of word processing and graphics programs rather than to supplant them. To that end, text was stored in, loaded from, and saved back to word processor files in the native formats of a variety of word processors, including WordPerfect, WordStar, and early versions of Microsoft Word, rather than being incorporated into the chapter files. This allowed users to continue using their favorite word processors for major text changes, spelling checks, and so forth. Paragraphs other than default body text were tagged with descriptive tagnames that were entirely user-defined, and characters and attributes that have no native equivalent in a given word processor were represented with standardized sequences of characters. When working with the files outside of Ventura Publisher, these paragraph tags and special character and attribute codes could be freely changed, the same as any other text. These tags looked very much like HTML tags.

Ventura Publisher was the first major typesetting program to incorporate the concept of an implicit "underlying page" frame, and one of the first to incorporate a strong "style sheet" concept. It produced documents with a high degree of internal consistency, unless specifically overridden by the user. Its concepts of free-flowing text, paragraph tagging, and codes for attributes and special characters anticipated similar concepts inherent in HTML and XML. Likewise, its concept of "publication" files that tie together "chapter" files gave it the ability to handle documents hundreds (or even thousands) of pages in length as easily as a four-page newsletter.

The major strengths of the original DOS/GEM edition of Ventura Publisher were:

- Its ability to run, with reasonable response times, on a wide range of hardware (including 8086- and 286-based computers)
- Its ability to produce, by default, documents with a high degree of internal consistency
- Its automatic re-exporting of text to native word processor formats
- Its ability to print to a wide variety of devices, including PostScript, PCL, and InterPress laser printers and imagesetters, as well as certain popular dot-matrix and inkjet printers.

The original Ventura Software ceased operations in February 1990, and a new Ventura Software Inc. was formed at that time, an affiliated company of Xerox. The developers from the original company worked with the new Xerox Ventura Software company to produce Version 3.0 Gold. This was released in late 1990. Besides DOS/GEM, it was also available for Win16, Mac, and OS/2.

Xerox Ventura Publisher running on GEM

The three founders of the original Ventura Software no longer worked on the product after November 1990.

Version 4.0 was released in 1991. The last version released by Ventura Software Inc. was 4.1.1 in 1993.

The application was acquired by Corel in 1993. It was repackaged and soon released as Corel Ventura 4.2 without any major change in the application, other than to drop all support for platforms other than Microsoft Windows.

The first real Corel version was 5.0 (released in 1994), which made fundamental changes to both user interface and document structure. Because of this, and because of escalating hardware requirements of the various Corel versions, the original DOS/GEM edition still has a small number of die-hard users.

The application was rewritten for the Win32 platform and was released in 1996, labeled Corel Ventura 7 (instead of 6) so that it would match the version number of CorelDRAW. Corel Ventura 8 was released in 1998. The last published version was Corel Ventura 10 in 2002 (last updated in February 2003); it reportedly runs in Windows 10 under compatibility mode with some functional limitations after workarounds, and on Linux via Wine (verified in April 2020).

As an application with strengths in more structured documents, its main competitors were Adobe FrameMaker, QuarkXPress and later Adobe InDesign.

== Reception ==
Approving of its "general excellence", Ian McKinnell of Personal Computer World wrote in January 1987 that Ventura Publisher for GEM was immediately usable with his Macintosh experience, and cited the macro feature as "a real improvement over PageMaker on the Macintosh". He concluded that while it would not cause new users to buy a PC, for existing owners "Ventura Publisher is well worth investigating".

"Ventura Publisher has suffered greatly since being acquired by Xerox", InfoWorld in 1993 said, having "not significantly changed in five years [and] just can't compete against either QuarkXPress or PageMaker". The magazine said that Ventura 4.1.1 was the best of the three for math and tabie editing, and hoped that Corel would improve the software. InfoWorld in 1995 said "Corel Ventura 5 addresses many of the old Ventura Publisher's limits [but] still needs work", with QuarkXPress still superior for high-end desktop publishing and PageMaker for businesses. The magazine thought that "Ventura could again be the top PC publishing program" if Corel continued fixing the software and improving its UI.

== See also ==
- Microsoft Publisher – Desktop publishing software
- PagePlus – Desktop publishing software for Windows (1991–2019)
- Quark CopyDesk
- Quark – American software company
- Ready, Set, Go!
- Scribus – Desktop publishing application
- Timeworks Publisher – Desktop publishing application
