= Production artist =

Technical and creative position in a creative profession

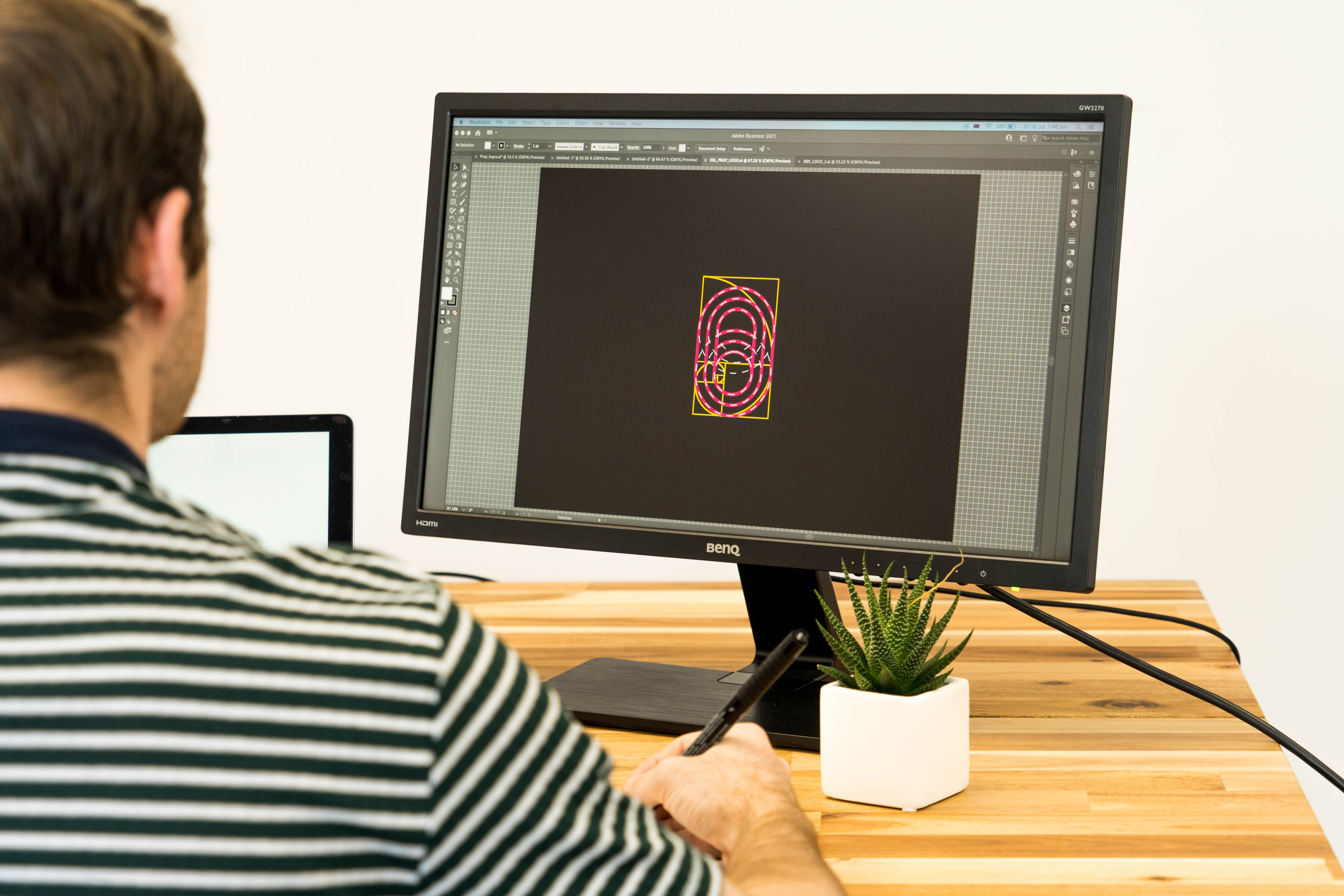

A production artist (also known as pre-press technician, artworker, finalizer, desktop publisher or mac operator) is a graphic design professional specialized in the technical aspects of design, playing a role in the final stage of the design process. They are responsible of turning a concept into a finished product, fine-tuning the work of graphic designers and preparing artworks for print production or digital media. Production artists work closely with designers, art directors, and other creative team members to ensure the final output meets quality standards and is ready for publication or production.

== Job description ==
Finalizing Designs: Production artists take designs from graphic designers and make necessary adjustments, such as formatting, resizing, and applying color corrections. They ensure that all elements are polished and ready for production.

File Preparation/Prepress Work: They ensure that design files are properly set up for printing or digital use. This includes checking for correct color profiles, resolution, bleed, and trim marks.

Software Proficiency: They are highly skilled in using industry-standard software, particularly Adobe Creative Suite (Illustrator, Photoshop, InDesign). Mastery of these tools is essential for executing design tasks effectively.

Quality Control: Production artists review files for any errors or inconsistencies, such as missing fonts, low-resolution images, or incorrect color spaces. They make necessary adjustments to ensure the final product meets quality standards.

Collaboration: Production artists often work closely with graphic designers, printers, and clients to ensure that the final product meets the desired specifications and quality standards.

Problem-Solving: They need to be able to troubleshoot and resolve technical issues that may arise during the production process.

== History ==
The job title originated at advertising agencies, assigning what was known as paste-up work (now prepress production) to the position. Production artists work closely with the designer and art director to execute the design. What distinguishes "production art" from design is opportunities to utilize prepress knowledge into creativity and design training in the work involved. The degree of technical knowledge required for some production art work may be comparable to higher skilled engineering, especially with computers.

The position was once exclusive to print media electronic media such as web pages and CD-ROMs. Skill requirements for a production artist are creative, print production, and working knowledge in using art software of creative industries. Job descriptions for production artists are usually tailored to a company's specific needs. Alternate job titles such as multimedia specialist have been used to expand the role of production artists to multimedia development. Entry level multimedia work may include data entry or basic skill level programming tasks.

In companies that provide mass printing on paper, novelty items, and out-of-home advertising printing, this position requires an encyclopedic knowledge of pre-press and printing standards through variety of methods. In such companies, it is often a higher paid position than a junior graphic designer or desktop publisher, as it requires more specific knowledge than gathering digital assets and exporting files to standardized image file formats or page description languages such as Adobe Portable Document Format.

Per Comic Book historian Mark Evanier, in that industry the position generally has involved into "lettering corrections, art touch-ups, laying out advertising and other editorial material and generally doing whatever in the office required the services of someone who could draw a little."
