= Pinspeck camera =

A pinspeck camera is the complement, or anti-pinhole, of a pinhole camera, using an opaque dot in a clear aperture instead of a small hole. Each object point casts the dot's shadow onto the image plane, producing a weak negative image.

== Principle ==
In a pinspeck camera, image formation occurs through selective blocking rather than transmission: each object point casts the shadow of the opaque speck onto the image plane. Torralba and Freeman describe the same complementary effect for an occluder, whose cast shadow can contain a negative image of the surrounding scene rather than only the occluder's silhouette.
