= Solarigraphy =

Photographic technique

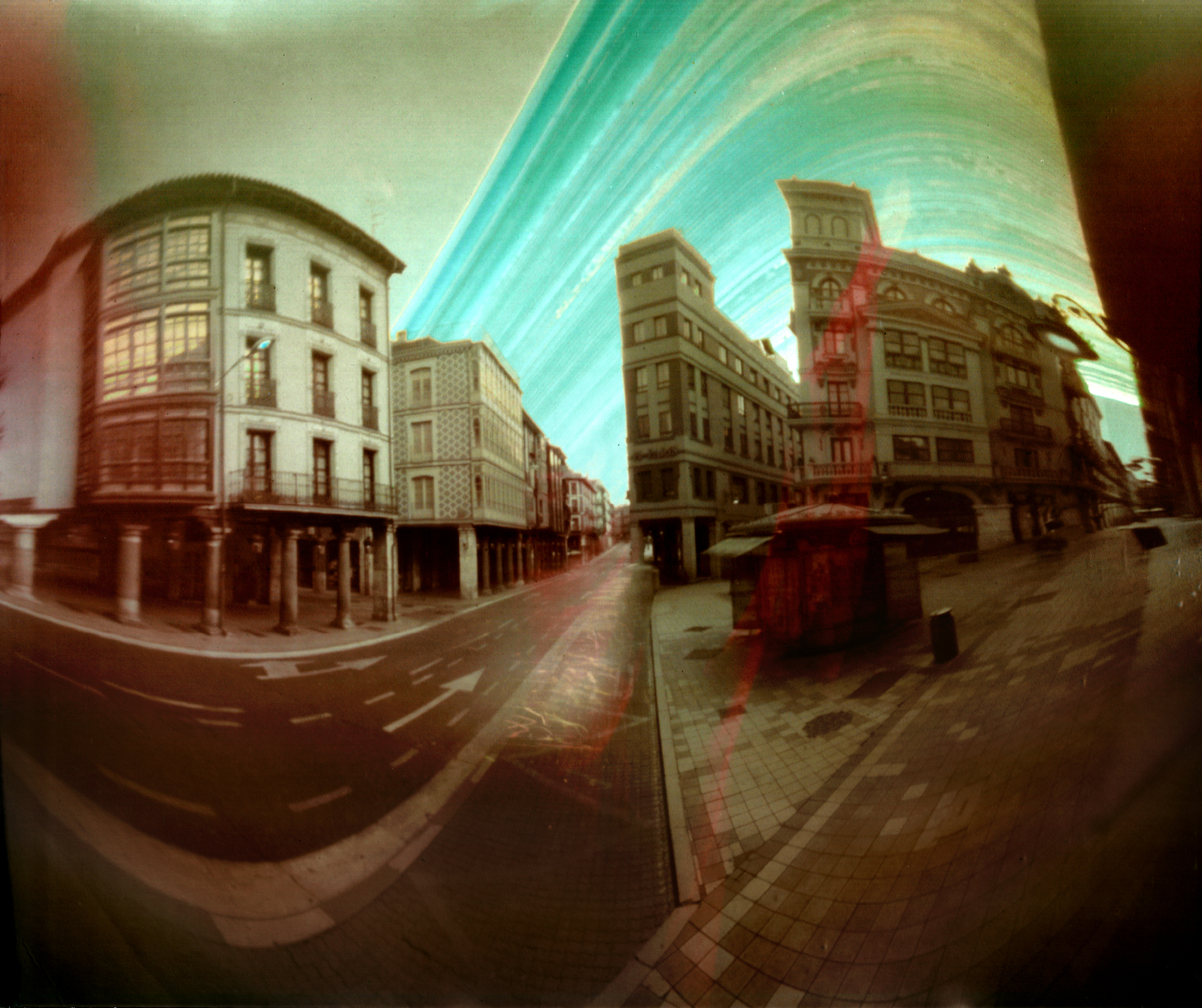
Solarigraph with the sun paths between July 2018 and May 2019 in a street at Valladolid, Spain

Solarigraphy (or solargraphy) is a concept and a photographic practice based on the observation of the sun path in the sky (different in each place on the Earth) and its effect on the landscape, captured by a specific procedure that combines pinhole photography and digital processing. Invented around 2000, solarigraphy uses photographic paper without chemical processing, a pinhole camera and a scanner to create images that catch the daily journey of the sun along the sky with very long exposure times, from several hours to several years. The longest known solarigraph was captured over the course of eight years. Solarigraphy is an extreme case of long-exposure photography.

== Beginnings ==
Previous experiments with long exposures on photosensitive papers and with registration of the sun arcs in the sky were done at the end of the 1990s in Poland by the students Paweł Kula, Przemek Jesionek, Marek Noniewicz and Konrad Smołenski and in the 1980s by Dominique Stroobant, respectively. In 2000, Diego López Calvín, Sławomir Decyk and Paweł Kula started a global and synchronized photographic work known as "Solaris Project". This work, which mixes together art and science, is based on the active participation through the Internet of people interested in the apparent movement of the Sun, that is photographed with artisan pinhole cameras loaded with photosensitive material and subjected to very long exposures of time.

== Characteristics ==
Solarigraphs are images that show real elements that cannot be seen with the naked eye representing the apparent trajectories of the sun in the sky due to the rotation of the Earth on its axis. They are mostly made with pinhole cameras and very long exposures, from one day to six months between the winter solstice and the summer solstice or vice versa. The images show the different paths of the Sun the observer has according to the respective latitude over the Earth's surface.

The cameras are loaded with photosensitive materials (mainly photographic paper in black and white) so that the sunlight produces a direct blackening on the surface. The trajectories of the Sun and the landscape image appear directly on the surface of the paper forming a negative that is digitised and treated with image processing software. These images also provide information about the periods in which the Sun does not appear to be shining as it is hidden by clouds, which provides information about the weather.

== Technical basis and procedure ==
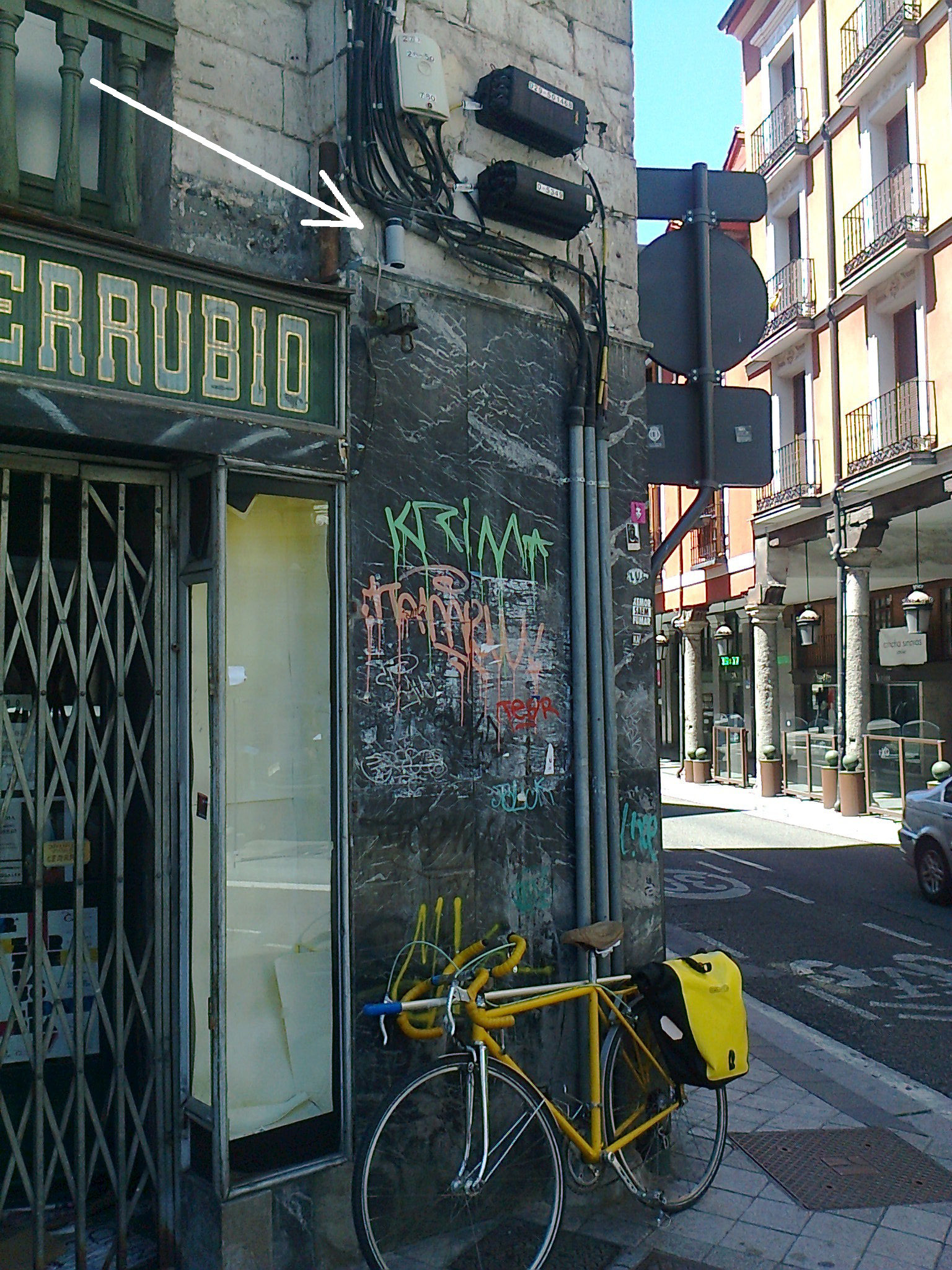
Situation of a solarigraphic camera, a can, stuck to a building to obtain the upper photo

The key to the technique is the nature of photographic paper that darkens by direct light without having to develop it, thus giving the low sensitivity necessary for such long exposures. Although lenses can be used in obtaining solarigraphs with exposure times of a few hours, for longer exposures a pinhole through which the light enters the camera is more convenient. For this purpose home-made pinhole cameras, usually made of using empty drink cans, film canisters or recycled plastic tubes.

A photographic paper for black and white is placed inside the container that acts as a camera, and once the camera is fixed in the chosen place, usually pointing east, south or west, the pinhole is uncovered allowing the light to enter until the camera is collected.

The image, already visible at that time on the paper, is negative and ephemeral, since the light continues to expose the emulsion if it is shown, so it is necessary to protect the paper from the light and scan it so it can be viewed in a useable format. This second digital part of the process includes inverting the image to make it positive and usually increasing the contrast. Different circumstances make solarigraphs to show different colours depending on the colour of the light and the paper chosen, but also on conditions such as temperature and humidity at different times of impression, in addition to chemical changes in the paper during exposure.
