= Pinhole glasses =

Perforated eyeglasses

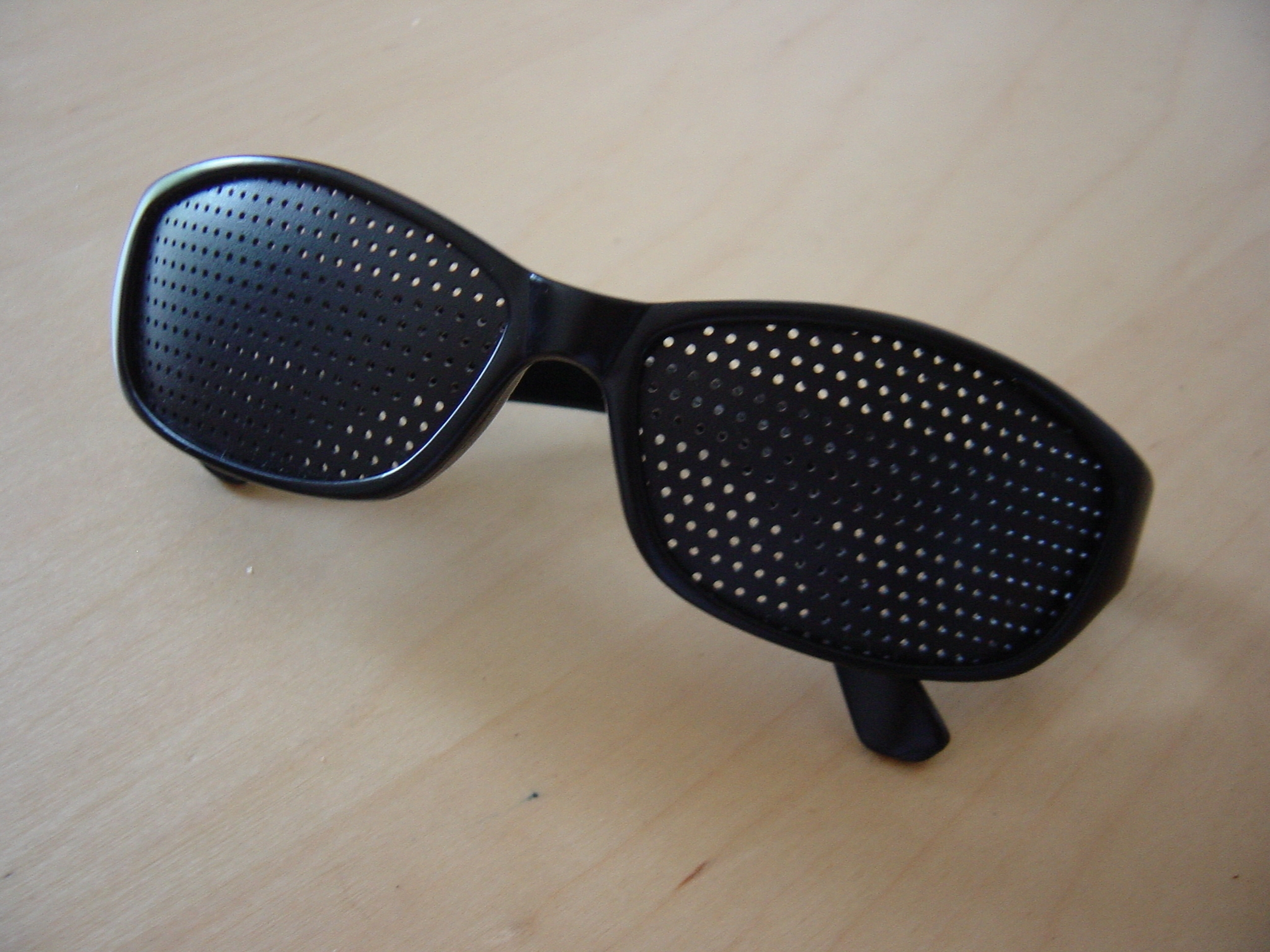
Pinhole glasses

The effect of pinhole glasses approximated by a camera

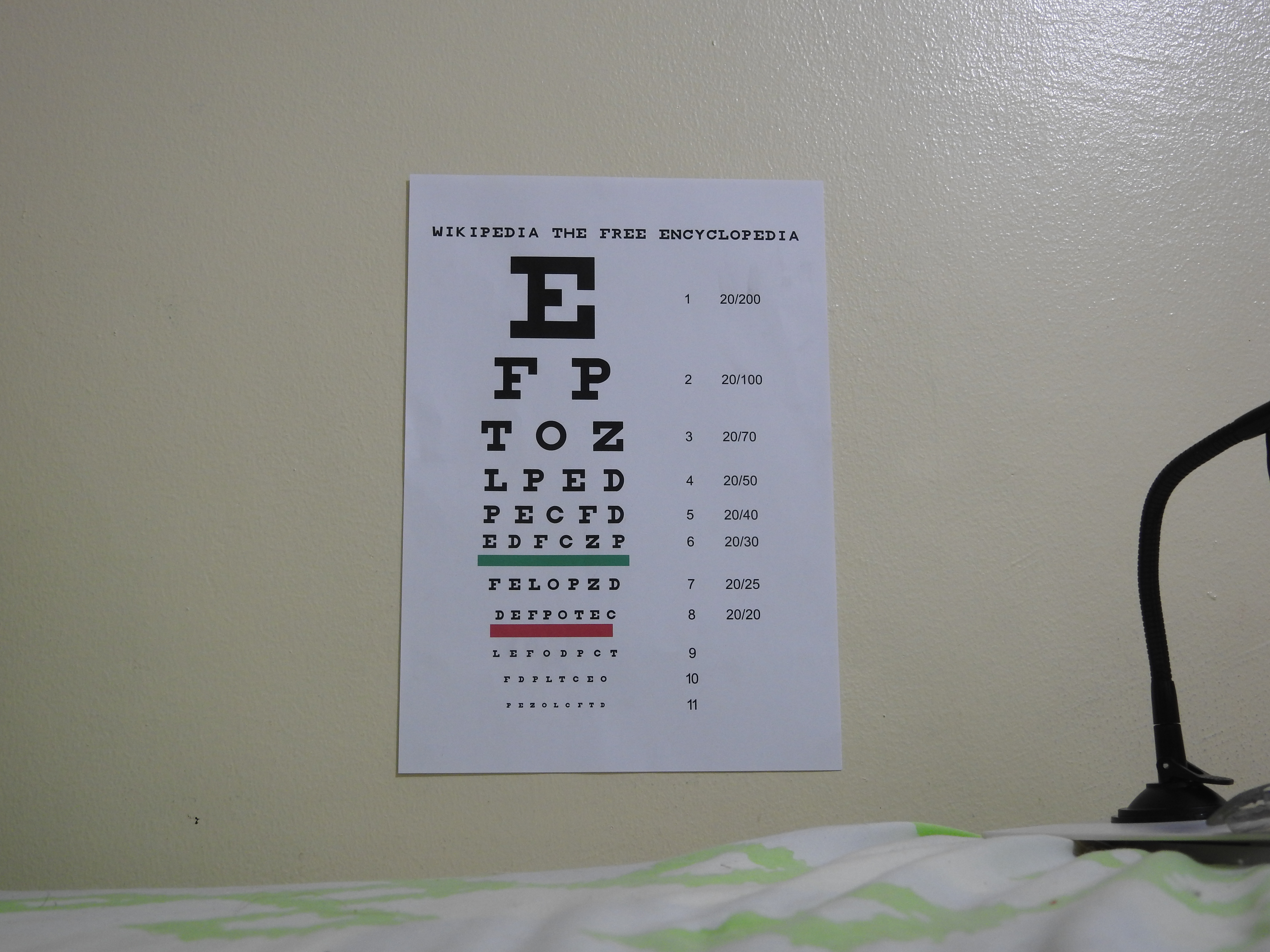
An eye chart in sharp focus, as would be seen under normal vision.

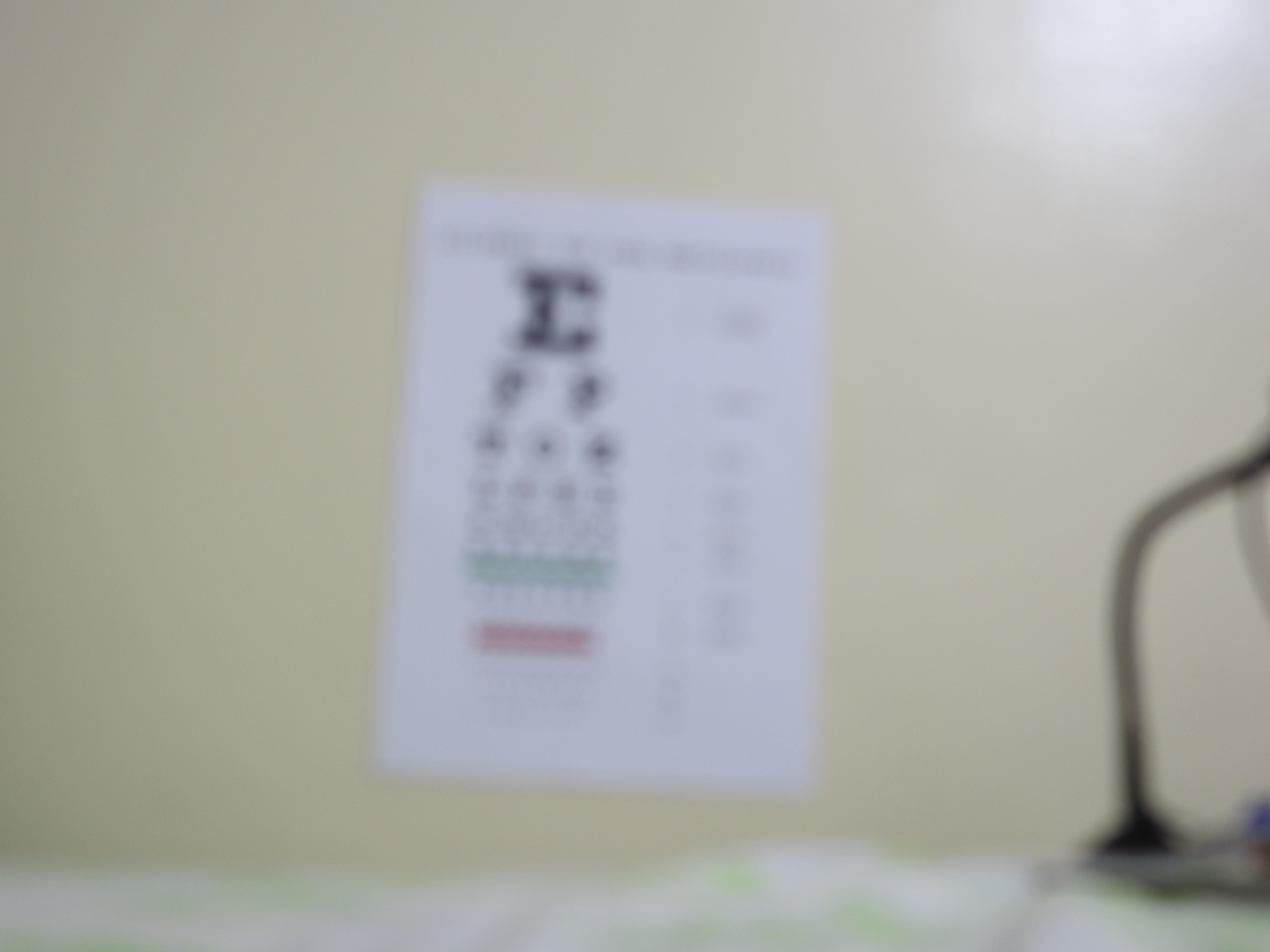
A blurred eye chart, as would be seen by an individual with a refractive error.

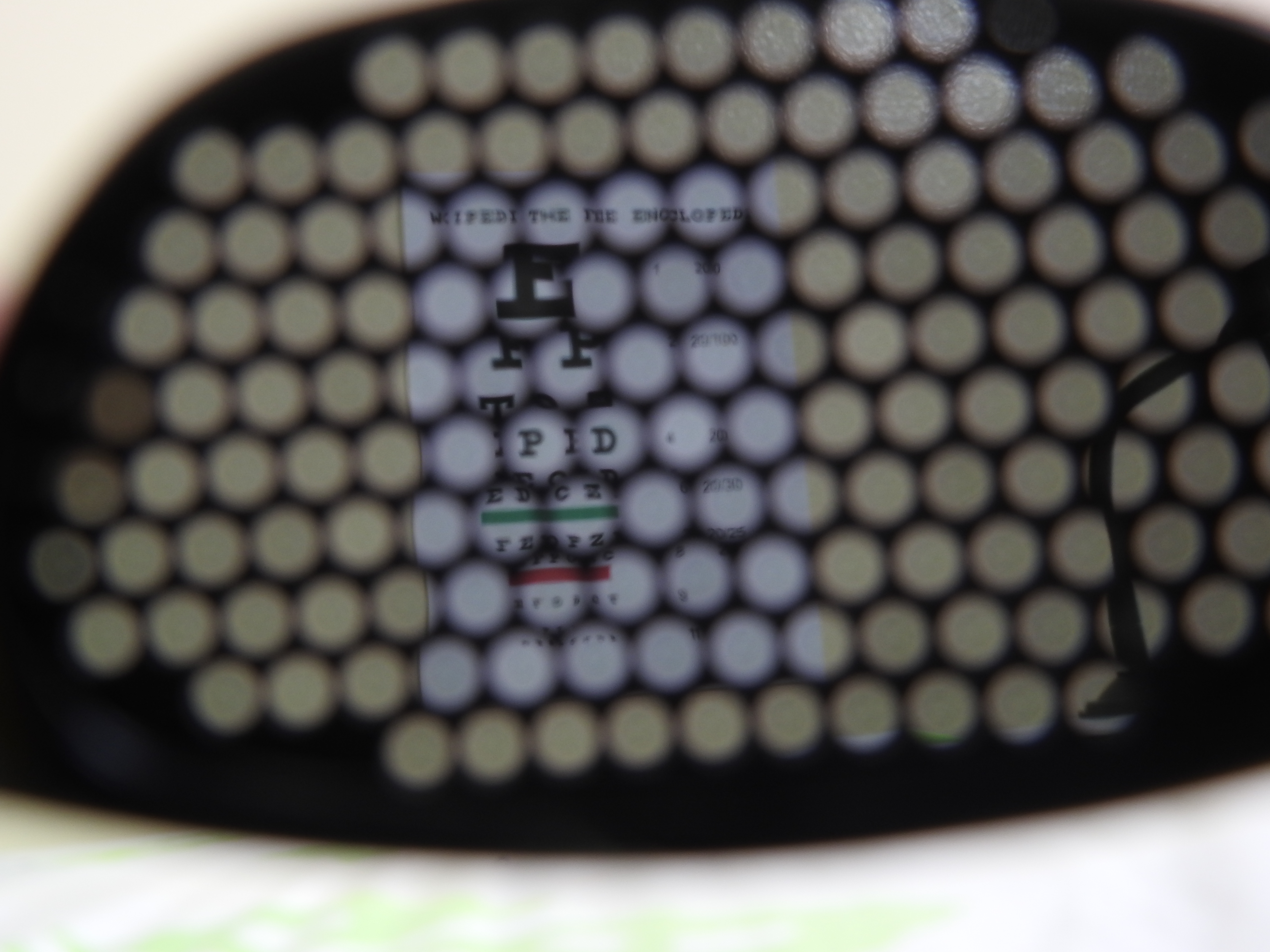
Pinhole glasses, when placed over the out of focus camera, make the chart somewhat readable once more. However, they darken the image and the grid blocks some of the finer details, requiring slight movements of the camera for the whole chart to be somewhat comfortably read.

Pinhole glasses, also known as stenopeic glasses, are eyeglasses with a series of pinhole-sized perforations filling an opaque sheet of plastic in place of each lens.

== Operation ==
Similar to the workings of a pinhole camera, each perforation allows only a very narrow beam of light to enter the eye which reduces the size of the circle of confusion on the retina and increases depth of field. In eyes with refractive error, the result is often a sharper image. However, a second effect may appear at the common bridge between each two adjacent holes, whereby two different rays of light coming from the same object (but each passing through a different hole) are diffracted back toward the eye and onto different places on the retina.

Unlike conventional prescription glasses, pinhole glasses produce an image without the pincushion effect around the edges (which makes straight lines appear curved). While pinhole glasses are claimed to be useful for people who are both near- and far-sighted, they are not recommended for people with over 6 diopters of myopia. Additionally, pinhole glasses reduce brightness and peripheral vision, and thus should not be used for driving or when operating machinery.

Merchants state that, after prolonged use, the plastic grating should become easy to ignore. However, each time the user blinks, the horizontal lines of the grating will briefly appear to be thicker. This is because the eyelid moving over the pupil will reduce the amount of light falling onto the retina and thus will briefly remove the lateral inhibition effect which normally makes all the holes appear bigger (and the grating appear thinner). So, as long as the user keeps blinking, they will be constantly reminded of the dark grating covering their eyes.

== In medicine ==
Pinhole glasses have been marketed by various companies on the claim that—combined with certain eye exercises—they could permanently improve eyesight. However, no scientific evidence has been found to support these claims. Due to a lack of formal clinical studies to substantiate this type of claim by companies selling pinhole glasses, this type of claim is no longer allowed to be made in the United States under the terms of a legal settlement with the Federal Trade Commission. The pinhole occluder, a device used by ophthalmologists and optometrists for diagnosis of refractive errors, works on the same principles, but is not intended for use outside of diagnosis.

Due partly to the open holes, pinhole glasses are not suitable as eye protection.

== See also ==
- Snow goggles
