= Desktop publishing =

Page layout using a personal computer

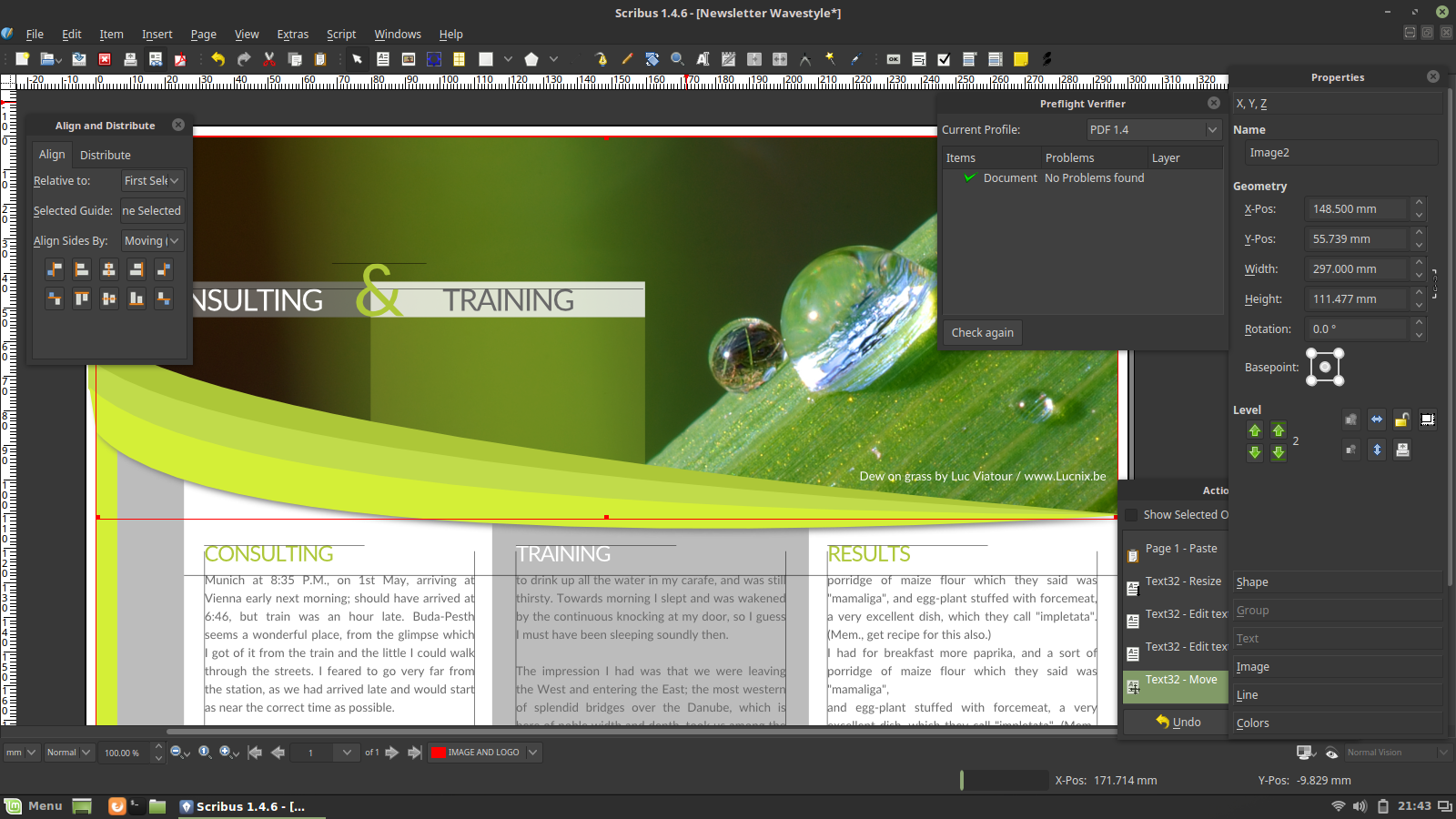
Scribus 1.4.6 desktop publishing software

Desktop publishing (DTP) is the creation of documents using dedicated software on a personal ("desktop") computer. It was first used almost exclusively for print publications, but now it also assists in the creation of various forms of online content. Desktop publishing software can generate page layouts and produce text and image content comparable to the simpler forms of traditional typography and printing. This technology allows individuals, businesses, and other organizations to self-publish a wide variety of content, from menus to magazines to books, without the expense of commercial printing.

Desktop publishing often requires the use of a personal computer and WYSIWYG page layout software to create documents for either large-scale publishing or small-scale local printing and distribution – although non-WYSIWYG systems such as TeX and LaTeX are also used, especially in scientific publishing. Originally, desktop publishing methods provided more control over design, layout, and typography than word processing software but the latter has evolved to include most, if not all, capabilities previously available only with dedicated desktop publishing software.

The same DTP skills and software used for common paper and book publishing are sometimes used to create graphics for point of sale displays, presentations, infographics, brochures, business cards, promotional items, trade show exhibits, retail package designs and outdoor signs.

== History ==
Desktop publishing was first developed at Xerox PARC in the 1970s. A contradictory claim states that desktop publishing began in 1983 with a program developed by James Davise at a community newspaper in Philadelphia. The program Type Processor One ran on a PC using a graphics card for a WYSIWYG display and was offered commercially by Best Info in 1984. Desktop typesetting with only limited page makeup facilities arrived in 1978–1979 with the introduction of TeX, and was extended in 1985 with the introduction of LaTeX.

The desktop publishing market took off in 1985 with the introduction in January of the Apple LaserWriter laser printer for the year-old Apple Macintosh personal computer. This momentum was kept up with the release that July of PageMaker software from Aldus, which rapidly became the standard software application for desktop publishing. With its advanced layout features, PageMaker immediately relegated word processors like Microsoft Word to the composition and editing of purely textual documents. Word did not begin to acquire desktop publishing features until a decade later, and by 2003, it was regarded only as "good" and not "great" at desktop publishing tasks. The term "desktop publishing" is attributed to Aldus founder Paul Brainerd, who sought a marketing catchphrase to describe the small size and relative affordability of this suite of products, in contrast to the expensive commercial phototypesetting equipment of the day.

Ventura Publisher was one of the first popular desktop publishing packages for IBM PC compatible computers, typically running MS-DOS, in 1986. The software was originally developed by Ventura Software. The first version of Ventura Publisher was released in 1986 with worldwide distribution by Xerox. Ventura Publisher allowed file sizes large enough for magazine type publications through a chapter capability, in addition to flyers and brochures. One advantage to IBM-PC computer users was the ability of Ventura Publisher to interface directly with word processors such as WordPerfect, WordStar, and early versions of Microsoft Word. This allowed editing of documents to take place in the native word-processing program. Changes made in Ventura were saved back to that program as well. Eventually, as Corel Corporation bought Ventura Publisher and simultaneously, the Microsoft Office suite of applications became more powerful – especially with the inclusion of Microsoft Publisher. Many organizations transitioned from purpose-built software like Ventura Publisher to Microsoft's Word and Publisher and Office software applications, to save money and synchronize business applications across an enterprise.

Before the advent of desktop publishing, the only option available to most people for producing typed documents (as opposed to handwritten documents) was a typewriter, typically limited to a handful of fixed-width typefaces and at most two font sizes. The ability to create WYSIWYG page layouts on screen and then print pages containing text and graphical elements at 300 dpi resolution was a major development for the personal computer industry. The ability to do all this with industry standards like PostScript also radically changed the traditional publishing industry, which at the time was accustomed to buying end-to-end turnkey solutions for digital typesetting which came with their own proprietary hardware workstations. Newspapers and other print publications began to transition to DTP-based programs from older layout systems such as Atex and other programs in the early 1980s.

Desktop publishing was still in its early stage in the early 1980s. Users of the PageMaker/LaserWriter/Macintosh 512K system endured frequent software crashes, Mac's low-resolution 512x342 1-bit monochrome screen, the inability to control letter spacing, kerning, and other typographic features, and the discrepancies between screen display and printed output. However, it was an unheard-of combination at the time, and was received with considerable acclaim.

Behind the scenes, technologies developed by Adobe Systems set the foundation for professional desktop publishing applications. The LaserWriter and LaserWriter Plus printers included scalable Adobe PostScript fonts built into their ROM memory. The LaserWriter's PostScript capability allowed publication designers to proof files on a local printer, then print the same file at DTP service bureaus using optical resolution 600+ ppi PostScript printers such as those from Linotronic.

Later, the Macintosh II was released, which was considerably more suitable for desktop publishing due to its greater expandability, support for large color multi-monitor displays, and its SCSI storage interface (which allowed hard drives to be attached to the system). Macintosh-based systems continued to dominate the market into 1986, when the GEM-based Ventura Publisher was introduced for MS-DOS computers. PageMaker's pasteboard metaphor closely simulated the process of creating layouts manually, but Ventura Publisher automated the layout process through its use of tags and style sheets and automatically generated indices and other body matter. This made it particularly suitable for the creation of manuals and other long-form documents.

Desktop publishing moved into the home market in 1986 with Professional Page for the Amiga, Publishing Partner (now PageStream) for the Atari ST, GST's Timeworks Publisher on the PC and Atari ST, and Calamus for the Atari TT030. Software was published even for 8-bit computers like the Apple II and Commodore 64: Home Publisher, The Newsroom, and geoPublish.

During its early years, desktop publishing acquired a bad reputation as a result of untrained users who created poorly organized, unprofessional-looking "ransom note effect" layouts. (Similar criticism was leveled again against early World Wide Web publishers a decade later.) However, some desktop publishers who mastered the programs were able to achieve near professional results. Desktop publishing skills were considered of primary importance in career advancement in the 1980s, but increased accessibility to more user-friendly DTP software has made DTP a secondary skill to art direction, graphic design, multimedia development, marketing communications, and administrative careers. DTP skill levels range from what may be learned in a couple of hours (e.g., learning how to put clip art in a word processor), to what's typically required in a college education. The discipline of DTP skills range from technical skills such as prepress production and programming, to creative skills such as communication design and graphic image development.

As of 2014, Apple computers remain dominant in publishing, even as the most popular software has changed from QuarkXPress – an estimated 95% market share in the 1990s – to Adobe InDesign. An Ars Technica writer said in an article: "I've heard about Windows-based publishing environments, but I've never actually seen one in my 20+ years in design and publishing".

== Terminology ==
There are two types of pages in desktop publishing: digital pages and virtual paper pages to be printed on physical paper pages. All computerized documents are technically digital, which are limited in size only by computer memory or computer data storage space. Virtual paper pages will ultimately be printed, and will therefore require paper parameters coinciding with standard physical paper sizes such as A4, letter paper and legal paper. Alternatively, the virtual paper page may require a custom size for later trimming. Some desktop publishing programs allow custom sizes designated for large format printing used in posters, billboards and trade show displays. A virtual page for printing has a predesignated size of virtual printing material and can be viewed on a monitor in WYSIWYG format. Each page for printing has trim sizes (edge of paper) and a printable area if bleed printing is not possible as is the case with most desktop printers. A web page is an example of a digital page that is not constrained by virtual paper parameters. Most digital pages may be dynamically re-sized, causing either the content to scale in size with the page or the content to re-flow.

Master pages are templates used to automatically copy or link elements and graphic design styles to some or all the pages of a multipage document. Linked elements can be modified without having to change each instance of an element on pages that use the same element. Master pages can also be used to apply graphic design styles to automatic page numbering. Cascading Style Sheets can provide the same global formatting functions for web pages that master pages provide for virtual paper pages. Page layout is the process by which the elements are laid on the page orderly, aesthetically and precisely. The main types of components to be laid out on a page include text, linked images (that can only be modified as an external source), and embedded images (that may be modified with the layout application software). Some embedded images are rendered in the application software, while others can be placed from an external source image file. Text may be keyed into the layout, placed, or – with database publishing applications – linked to an external source of text which allows multiple editors to develop a document at the same time. Graphic design styles such as color, transparency and filters may also be applied to layout elements. Typography styles may be applied to text automatically with style sheets. Some layout programs include style sheets for images in addition to text. Graphic styles for images may include border shapes, colors, transparency, filters, and a parameter designating the way text flows around the object (also known as "wraparound" or "runaround").

== Comparisons ==
=== With word processing ===
As desktop publishing software still provides extensive features necessary for print publishing, modern word processors now have publishing capabilities beyond those of many older DTP applications, blurring the line between word processing and desktop publishing.

In the early 1980s, the graphical user interface was still in its embryonic stage and DTP software was in a class of its own when compared to the leading word processing applications of the time. Programs such as WordPerfect and WordStar were still mainly text-based and offered little in the way of page layout, other than perhaps margins and line spacing. On the other hand, word processing software was necessary for features like indexing and spell checking – features that are common in many applications today. As computers and operating systems became more powerful, versatile, and user-friendly in the 2010s, vendors have sought to provide users with a single application that can meet almost all their publication needs.

=== With other digital layout software ===
In earlier modern-day usage, DTP usually did not include digital tools such as TeX or troff, though both can easily be used on a modern desktop system, and are standard with many Unix-like operating systems and are readily available for other systems. The key difference between digital typesetting software and DTP software is that DTP software is generally interactive and "What you see [onscreen] is what you get" (WYSIWYG) in design, while other digital typesetting software, such as TeX, LaTeX and other variants, tend to operate in "batch mode", requiring the user to enter the processing program's markup language (e.g. HTML) without immediate visualization of the finished product. This kind of workflow is less user-friendly than WYSIWYG, but more suitable for conference proceedings and scholarly articles as well as corporate newsletters or other applications where consistent, automated layout is important.

In the 2010s, interactive front-end components of TeX, such as TeXworks and LyX, have produced "what you see is what you mean" (WYSIWYM) hybrids of DTP and batch processing. These hybrids are focused more on the semantics than the traditional DTP. Furthermore, with the advent of TeX editors the line between desktop publishing and markup-based typesetting is becoming increasingly narrow as well; software which separates itself from the TeX world and develops itself in the direction of WYSIWYG markup-based typesetting is GNU TeXmacs.

On a different note, there is a slight overlap between desktop publishing and what is known as hypermedia publishing (e.g. web design, kiosk, CD-ROM). Many graphical HTML editors such as Microsoft FrontPage and Adobe Dreamweaver use a layout engine similar to that of a DTP program. However, many web designers still prefer to write HTML without the assistance of a WYSIWYG editor, for greater control and ability to fine-tune the appearance and functionality. Another reason that some Web designers write in HTML is that WYSIWYG editors often result in excessive lines of code, leading to code bloat that can make the pages hard to troubleshoot.

=== With web design ===
Desktop publishing produces primarily static print or digital media, the focus of this article. Similar skills, processes, and terminology are used in web design. Digital typography is the specialization of typography for desktop publishing. Web typography addresses typography and the use of fonts on the World Wide Web. Desktop style sheets apply formatting for print, Web Cascading Style Sheets (CSS) provide format control for web display. Web HTML font families map website font usage to the fonts available on the user's web browser or display device.

== Software ==
A wide variety of DTP applications and websites are available and are listed separately.

== File formats ==
The design industry standard is PDF. The older EPS format is also used and supported by most applications.

== See also ==
- Comparison of desktop publishing software
- List of desktop publishing software
- Document processor – Device or computer program used for writing and editing documents
- Camera-ready – Document technically ready to print
- Desktop video – Pre-digital video editing on personal computers
- DTP artist – Desktop publishing worker
- E-book – Book published in digital form
- Digital publishing – Publishing and disseminating documents via electronic means
- Web design – Creation and maintenance of websites
- WYSIWYG – Acronym for "what you see is what you get" in computing
