= Stat camera =

Large-format stationary camera

A stat camera is a large-format vertical or horizontal stationary camera used to shoot film for camera-ready artwork, and sometimes called a copy camera. This is a large bellows-type camera which consists of the copy-board, bellows and lens, and filmboard. The vertical type can take up relatively little space, while the horizontal fills two rooms; bellows, lens, and copyboard on one side of the wall; filmboard and darkroom on the other. The type of film used is black and white "orthochromatic"; i.e., it is more sensitive to some colors than others. Guidelines, or "keylines" are created in light blue which read as white; while anything red or close to a red hue appears as black. The stat camera would be used to shoot color separations (using hue filters for each of the four process colors) and to produce halftone film for printing using a special reticulated gel mask. Screen printers will use the films, or 'positives', to expose the silk screen.

Stat cameras are also used to generate positives needed to create photo-stencils.

This process is invaluable to direct preservation of artwork, since the digital camera mimics lighting settings, and there is no scanner big enough to encompass such works.
