= Pinhole camera =

Type of camera

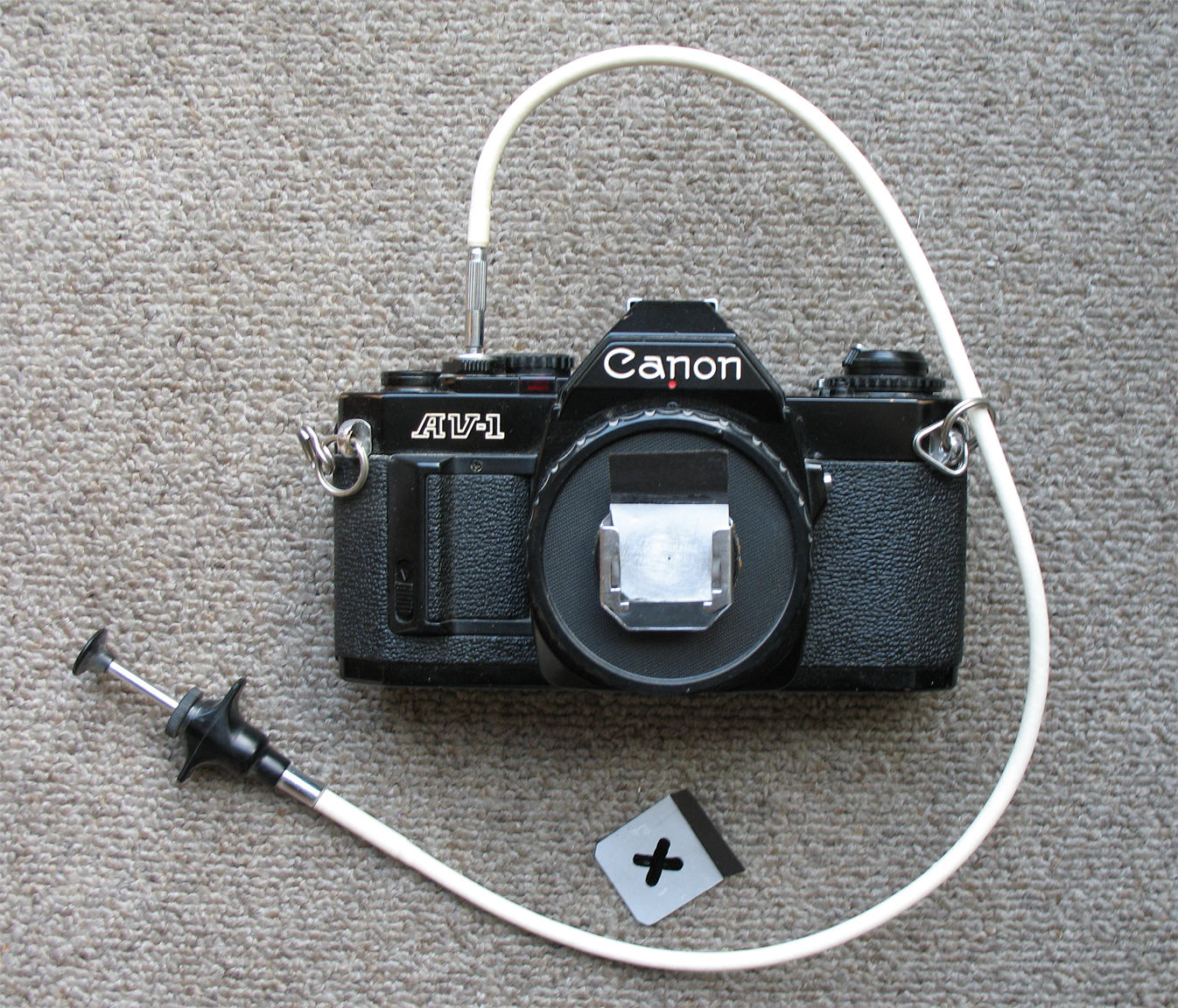
A camera with home-made pinhole application

A pinhole camera is a simple camera without a lens but with a tiny aperture (the so-called pinhole)—effectively a light-proof box with a small hole in one side. Light from a scene passes through the aperture and projects an inverted image on the opposite side of the box, which is known as the camera obscura effect. The size of the images depends on the distance between the object and the pinhole and the distance between pinhole and screen.

A Worldwide Pinhole Photography Day is observed on the last Sunday of April, every year.

== History ==
=== Camera obscura ===
The camera obscura or pinhole image is a natural optical phenomenon. Early known descriptions are found in the Chinese Mozi writings (circa 500 BCE) and the Aristotelian Problems (circa 300 BCE – 600 CE).

A diagram depicting Ibn al-Haytham's observations of light's behaviour through a pinhole

Ibn al-Haytham (965–1039), an Arab physicist also known as Alhazen, described the camera obscura effect. Over the centuries others started to experiment with it, mainly in dark rooms with a small opening in shutters, mostly to study the nature of light and to safely watch solar eclipses.

Giambattista Della Porta wrote in 1558 in his Magia Naturalis about using a concave mirror to project the image onto paper and to use this as a drawing aid. However, at about the same time, the use of a lens instead of a pinhole was introduced. In the 17th century, the camera obscura with a lens became a popular drawing aid that was further developed into a mobile device, first in a little tent and later in a box. The photographic camera, as developed early in the 19th century, was basically an adaptation of the box-type camera obscura with a lens.

The term "pin-hole" in the context of optics was found in James Ferguson's 1764 book Lectures on select subjects in mechanics, hydrostatics, pneumatics, and optics.

=== Early pinhole photography ===
Early pinhole camera. Light enters a dark box through a small hole and creates an inverted image on the wall opposite the hole.

The first known description of pinhole photography is found in the 1856 book The Stereoscope by Scottish inventor David Brewster, including the description of the idea as "a camera without lenses, and with only a pin-hole".

Sir William Crookes and William de Wiveleslie Abney were other early photographers to try the pinhole technique.

=== Film and integral photography experiments ===
According to inventor William Kennedy Dickson, the first experiments directed at moving pictures by Thomas Edison and his researchers took place around 1887 and involved "microscopic pin-point photographs, placed on a cylindrical shell". The size of the cylinder corresponded with their phonograph cylinder as they wanted to combine the moving images with sound recordings. Problems arose in recording clear pictures "with phenomenal speed" and the "coarseness" of the photographic emulsion when the pictures were enlarged. The microscopic pin-point photographs were soon abandoned. In 1893 the Kinetoscope was finally introduced with moving pictures on celluloid film strips. The camera that recorded the images, dubbed Kinetograph, was fitted with a lens.

Eugène Estanave experimented with integral photography, exhibiting a result in 1925 and publishing his findings in La Nature. After 1930 he chose to continue his experiments with pinholes replacing the lenticular screen.

== Usage ==
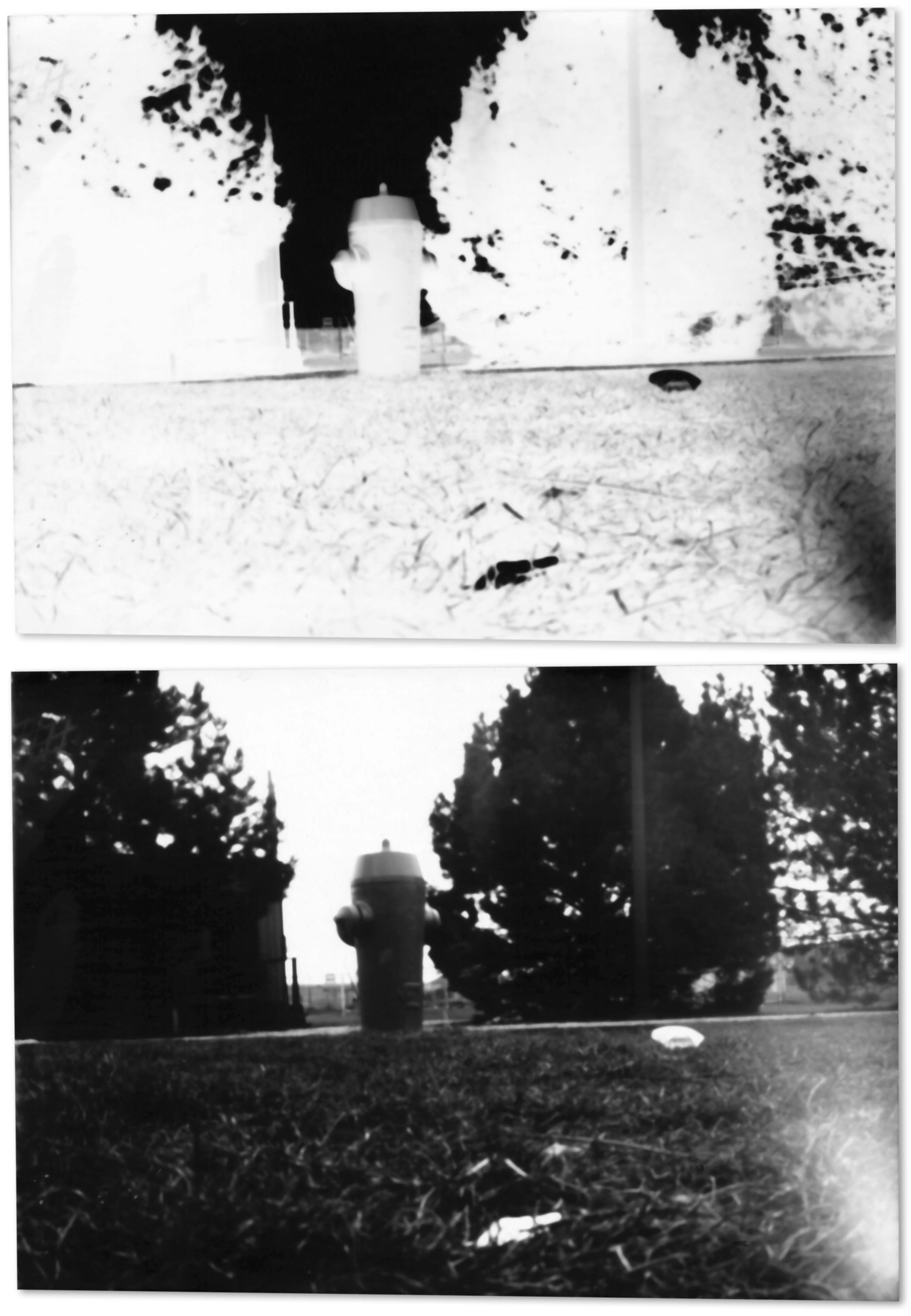
A fire hydrant photographed by a pinhole camera made from a shoe box, exposed on photographic paper to create the negative image (top). The positive image (bottom) was created digitally from the negative image. The length of the exposure was 40 seconds. There is noticeable flaring in the bottom-right corner of the image, likely due to extraneous light entering the camera box.

The image of a pinhole camera may be projected onto a translucent screen for a real-time viewing (used for safe observation of solar eclipses) or to trace the image on paper. But it is more often used without a translucent screen for pinhole photography with photographic film or photographic paper placed on the surface opposite to the pinhole aperture.

A common use of pinhole photography is to capture the movement of the sun over a long period of time. This type of photography is called solarigraphy. Pinhole photography is used for artistic reasons, but also for educational purposes to let pupils learn about, and experiment with, the basics of photography.

Pinhole cameras with CCDs (charge-coupled devices) are sometimes used for surveillance because they are difficult to detect.

Related cameras, image forming devices, or developments from it include Franke's widefield pinhole camera, the pinspeck camera, and the pinhead mirror.

Modern manufacturing has enabled the production of high quality pinhole lenses which may be used with digital cameras.

== Construction ==
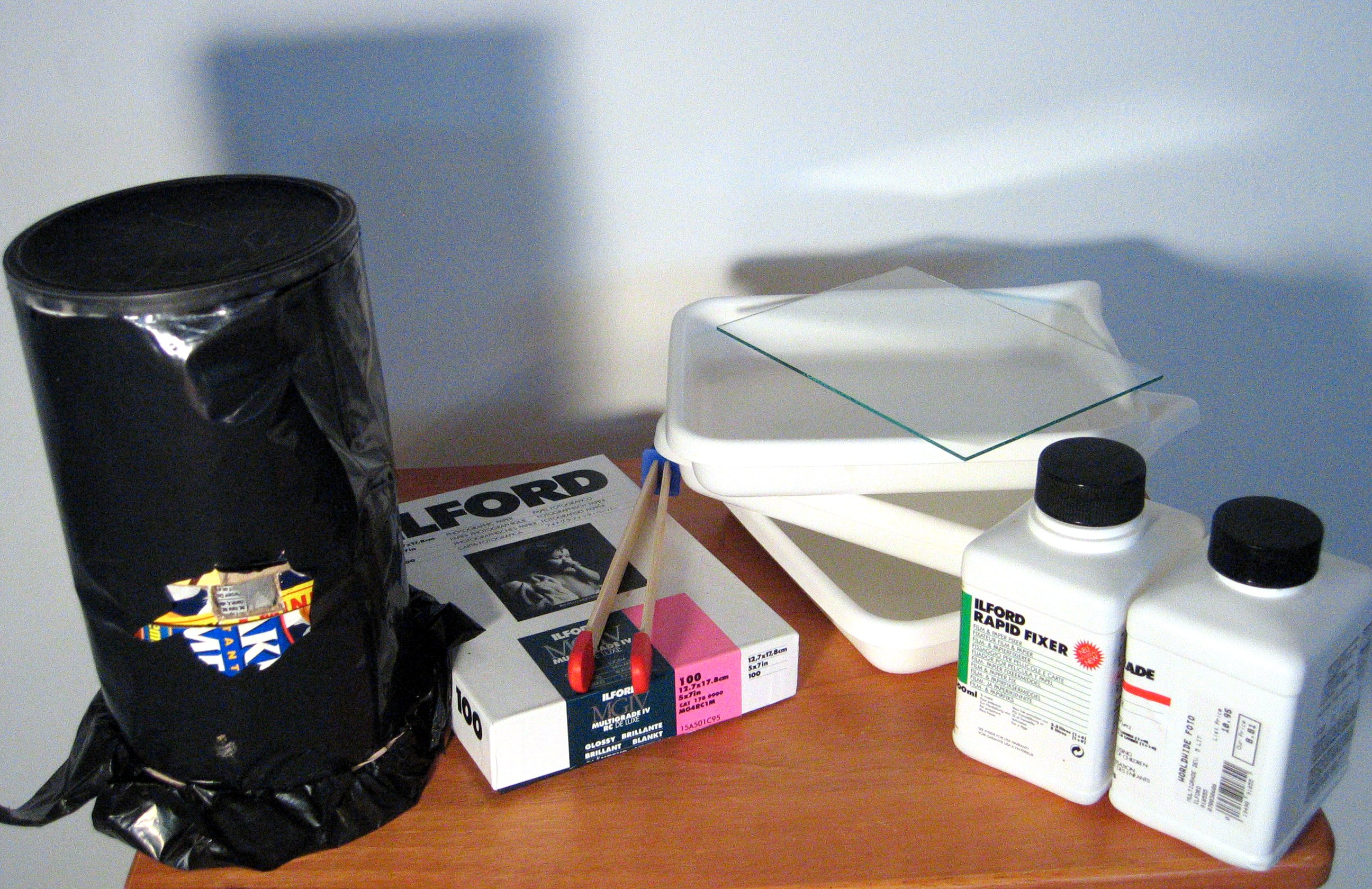
A home-made pinhole camera (on the left), wrapped in black plastic to prevent light leaks, and related developing supplies

Pinhole cameras can be handmade by the photographer for a particular purpose. In its simplest form, a pinhole camera includes a light-tight box with a pinhole in one end, and a piece of film or other light-sensitive material at the other end. Suitable containers include empty cylindrical cans, with one open end having a removable lid to facilitate loading film, and the other (closed) end equipped with the pinhole. Instructions for building a pinhole camera were published by Kodak, using either a 126 film cartridge or an empty can. The pinhole may be punched or drilled using a sewing needle or small diameter bit through a piece of aluminum foil or thin aluminum or brass sheet. This piece is then taped to the inside of the light-tight box, behind a hole cut or drilled through one end of the box. A flap of cardboard covering the pinhole, hinged with a piece of adhesive tape, can be used as a shutter. The interior of an effective pinhole camera is painted black to suppress internal stray light reflections.

Pinhole cameras can be constructed with a sliding film holder or back to adjust the distance between the film and the pinhole. This effectively changes the focal length, which affects both the angle of view and also the effective f-stop ratio. Moving the film closer to the pinhole will result in a wide angle field of view and shorter exposure time. Moving the film farther away from the pinhole will result in a telephoto or narrow-angle view and longer exposure time.

Instead of simple household materials, pinhole cameras also can be constructed by replacing the lens assembly in a conventional camera with a pinhole. In particular, compact 35 mm cameras whose lens and focusing assembly have been damaged can be reused as pinhole cameras, maintaining the use of the shutter and film winding mechanisms. As a result of the enormous increase in f-number, to maintain similar exposure times, the photographer must use a fast film in direct sunshine or other bright light conditions. Homemade or commercial pinholes also can be used in place of the lens on a single lens reflex camera (SLR) or mirrorless interchangeable lens camera. Use with a digital SLR allows metering and composition by trial and error, and since development is effectively free, it is a popular way to try pinhole photography.

=== Selection of pinhole size ===
Up to a certain point, the smaller the hole, the sharper the image, but the dimmer the projected image. Optimally, the diameter of the aperture should be less than or equal to 1/100 of the distance between it and the projected image.

Within limits, a small pinhole through a thin surface will result in a sharper image resolution because the projected circle of confusion at the image plane is practically the same size as the pinhole. An extremely small hole, however, can produce significant diffraction effects and a less clear image due to the wave properties of light. Additionally, vignetting occurs as the diameter of the hole approaches the thickness of the material in which it is punched, because the sides of the hole obstruct the light entering at anything other than 90 degrees.

The best pinhole is perfectly round (since irregularities cause higher-order diffraction effects) and in an extremely thin piece of material. Industrially produced pinholes benefit from laser etching, but a hobbyist can still produce pinholes of sufficiently high quality for photographic work.

A method of calculating the optimal pinhole diameter was first published by Joseph Petzval in 1857. The smallest possible diameter of the image point and therefore the highest possible image resolution and the sharpest image are given when:

$$d=\sqrt{2f\lambda}=1.41\sqrt{f\lambda}$$

where

d is the pinhole diameter
f is the distance from pinhole to image plane or "focal length"
λ is the wavelength of light

The first to apply wave theory to the problem was Lord Rayleigh in 1891. But due to some different theoretical assumptions he arrived at:

$$d=2\sqrt{f\lambda}$$

So his optimal pinhole was approximatively 41% bigger than Petzval's.

Another optimum pinhole size, proposed by Young (1971), uses the Fraunhofer approximation of the diffraction pattern behind a circular aperture, resulting in:

$$d=\sqrt{2.44}\sqrt{f\lambda}=1.562\sqrt{f\lambda}$$

This may be simplified to: $d=0.0366\sqrt{f}$, assuming that d and f are measured in millimetres and λ is 550 nm, corresponding to the central (yellow-green) wavelength of visible light. For a pinhole-to-film distance of 1 inch (25.4 mm), this works out to a pinhole of 0.185 mm in diameter. For f = 50 mm the optimal diameter is 0.259 mm. The equivalent f-stop value is f/193.

The depth of field is basically infinite, but this does not mean that no optical blurring occurs. The infinite depth of field means that image blur depends not on object distance but on other factors, such as the distance from the aperture to the film plane, the aperture size, the wavelength(s) of the light source, and motion of the subject or canvas. Additionally, pinhole photography can not avoid the effects of haze.

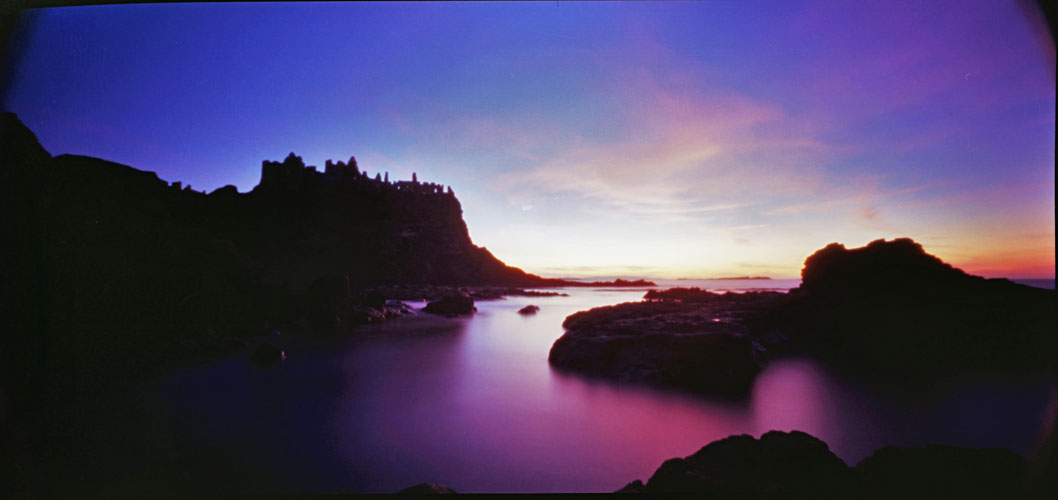
An example of a 20-minute exposure taken with a pinhole camera

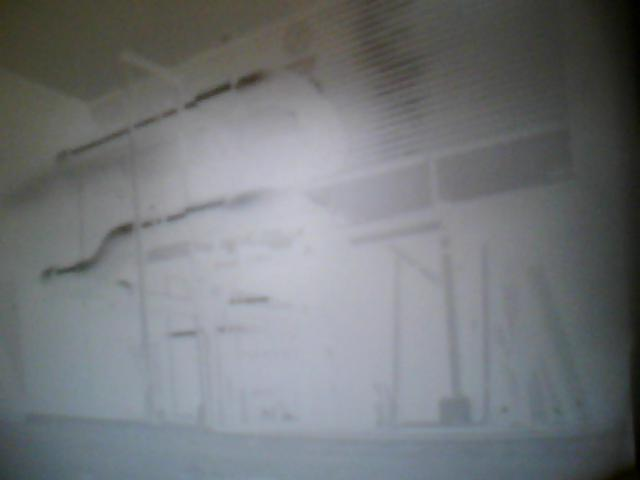
A photograph taken with a pinhole camera using an exposure time of 2s

=== Basis for optimum pinhole size ===
A graph of the resolution limit of the pinhole camera as a function of focal length (image distance)

In the 1970s, Young measured the resolution limit of the pinhole camera as a function of pinhole diameter and later published a tutorial in The Physics Teacher. He defined and plotted two normalized variables: the normalized resolution limit, $\frac{RL}{s}$, and the normalized focal length, $\dfrac{f}{\left ( \frac{s^2}{\lambda} \right )}$, where

RL is the resolution limit
s is the pinhole radius (d/2)
f is the focal length
λ is the wavelength of the light, typically about 550 nm.

On the left-side of the graph (where the normalized focal length is less than 0.65), the pinhole is large, and geometric optics applies; the normalized resolution limit is approximately constant at a value of 1.5, meaning the actual resolution limit is approximately 1.5 times the radius of the pinhole, independent of the normalized focal length. (Spurious resolution is also seen in the geometric-optics limit.)

On the right-side (normalized focal length is greater than 1), the pinhole is small, and Fraunhofer diffraction applies; the resolution limit is given by the far-field diffraction formula shown in the graph, which increases as the pinhole size decreases, assuming that f and λ are constant:

$$RL = \frac{0.61 \cdot \lambda f}{s}$$

In this version of formula as published by Young, the radius of the pinhole is used rather than its diameter, so the constant is 0.61 instead of the more usual 1.22.

In the center of the plot (normalized focal length is between 0.65 and 1), which is the region of near-field diffraction (or Fresnel diffraction), the pinhole focuses the light slightly, and the resolution limit is minimized when the normalized focal length is equal to one. That is, the actual focal length f (the distance between the pinhole and the film plane) is equal to $\frac{s^2}{\lambda}$. At this focal length, the pinhole focuses the light slightly, and the normalized resolution limit is approximately 2/3, i.e., the resolution limit is ~2/3 of the radius of the pinhole. The pinhole, in this case, is equivalent to a Fresnel zone plate with a single zone. The value s^{2}/λ is in a sense the natural focal length of the pinhole.

The relation f = s^{2}/λ yields an optimum pinhole diameter d = 2√fλ, so the experimental value differs slightly from the estimate of Petzval, above.

=== Calculating the f-number and required exposure ===
The f-number of the camera may be calculated by dividing the distance from the pinhole to the imaging plane (the focal length) by the diameter of the pinhole. For example, a camera with a 0.5 mm diameter pinhole, and a 50 mm focal length would have an f-number of 50/0.5, or 100 (f/100 in conventional notation).

Due to the large f-number of a pinhole camera, exposures will often encounter reciprocity failure. Once exposure time has exceeded about 1 second for film or 30 seconds for paper, one must compensate for the breakdown in linear response of the film/paper to intensity of illumination by using longer exposures.

Exposures projected on to modern light-sensitive photographic film can typically range from five seconds up to as much as several hours, with smaller pinholes requiring longer exposures to produce the same size image. Because a pinhole camera requires a lengthy exposure, its shutter may be manually operated, as with a flap made of opaque material to cover and uncover the pinhole.

== Natural pinhole phenomenon ==
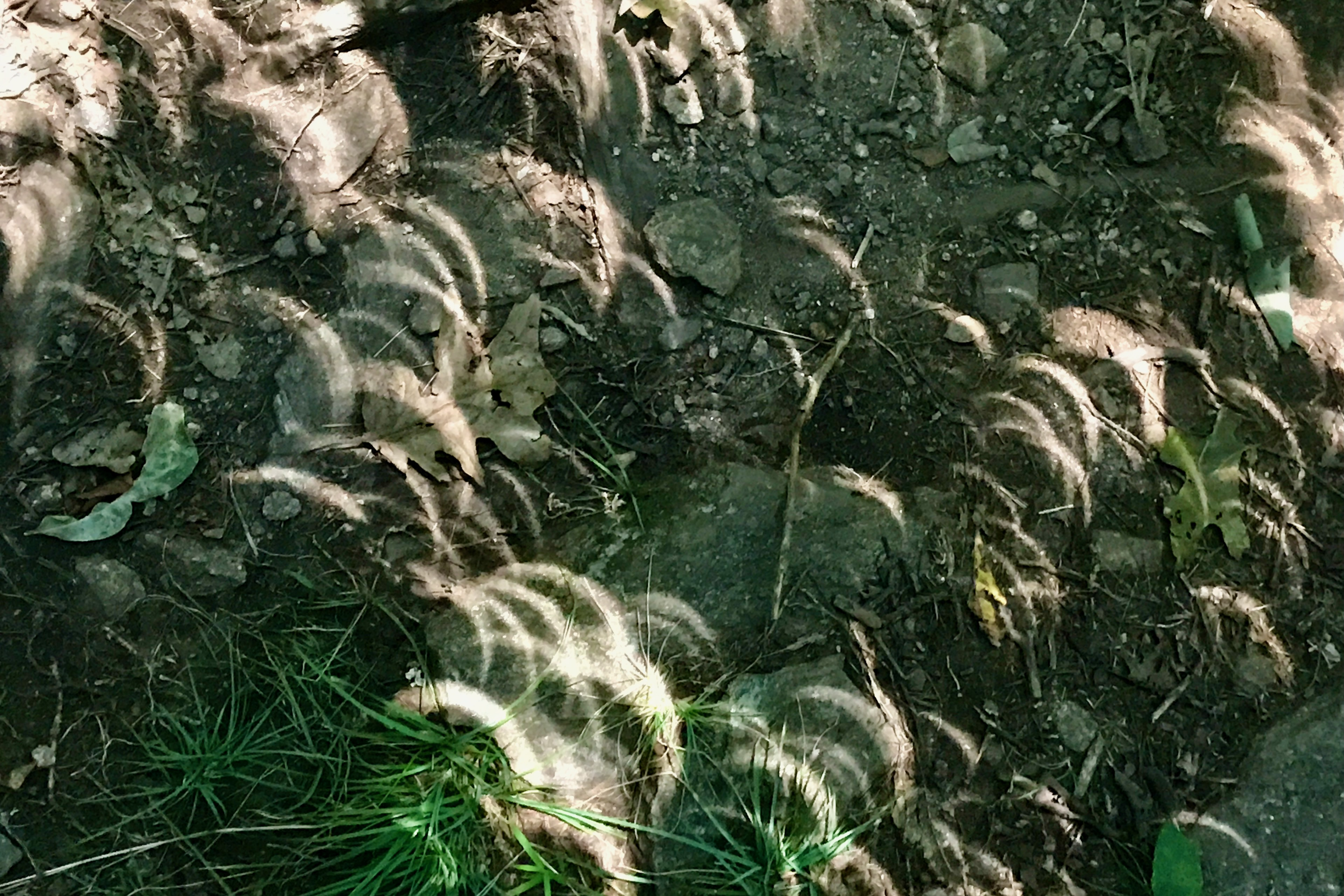
Solar eclipse crescent-shaped projections produced by natural pinholes formed by tree leaves

Natural pinholes project LED-grid streetlight onto sidewalk.

A pinhole camera effect can sometimes occur naturally. Small "pinholes" formed by the gaps between overlapping tree leaves and branches will create replica images of the sun (or other light sources) on flat surfaces. During a solar eclipse, this produces small crescents, and in the case of an annular eclipse hollow rings. Disco balls can also function as natural reflective pinhole cameras (also known as a pinhead mirror).

== Photographers using the technique ==
- Thomas Bachler
- Billy Childish
- George Davison
- Barbara Ess
- Wolf Howard
- Vera Lutter
- Abelardo Morell
- Steven Pippin
- Jesse Richards

== See also ==
- Camera obscura (usually employs a lens)
- Dirkon
- Henry Fox Talbot
- Ibn al-Haytham
- Nautilus (whose pinhole eye functions as a camera obscura)
- Pinhole camera model
- Pinhole glasses
- Pinhole occluder, a similar device used by ophthalmologists
- Spatial filter
- The Great Picture
- Zone plate
